= Tepe-class destroyer =

Turkish anti-air warfare destroyer under development

Class overview
- Name: Tepe-class
- Builders: Istanbul Naval Shipyard Command/ITK
- Operators: Turkish Navy
- Planned: 8 ships
- Building: 1

General characteristics
- Type: Anti-air warfare destroyer
- Displacement: 8300 tonnes
- Length: 149 m (488 ft 10 in)
- Beam: 21.3 m (69 ft 11 in)
- Draft: 5.75 m (18 ft 10 in)
- Propulsion: CODOG (2 x diesel + 2 x LM-2500 gas turbines)
- Speed: over 26 knots (48 km/h; 30 mph)
- Complement: 180-210 (can accommodate up to 240)
- Sensors & processing systems: Radars: ÇAFRAD 4D AESA Search radar; UMR S-Band Long-Range Radar; ÇFR X-Band Multi-Function Radar
- Armament: Naval Gun: MKE 127mm naval gun; Close in Weapons System: GÖKSUR or Levent SAM-based CIWS; Aselsan GOKDENIZ gun-based CIWS; 96-cell MiDLAS vertical launching system (VLS): Surface-to-air missiles: SAPAN (Hisar-D RF); SİPER Block 1/2; Surface-to-surface missiles: Gezgin cruise missile; Atmaca (anti-ship missile); Anti Submarine Warfare: VL ASROC; Torpedo tubes; Countermeasures; Direct/Kinetic Energy Weapons; Directional Infrared Counter Measures
- Aircraft carried: Sikorsky S-70B Seahawk; KALKAN VTOL; Titra Alpin 2

The Tepe-class destroyer (also known as the TF-2000 class) is a future anti-air warfare guided-missile destroyer class developed by the Turkish Naval Institute and currently under construction for the Turkish Naval Forces. The lead ship will be named TCG Kocatepe. The class will provide survivability in the presence of aerial threat and also support mission functions such as command, control, and communications, reconnaissance, early warning, surface warfare, anti-submarine warfare and electronic warfare. Moreover, once in service, the Tepe-class destroyers are slated to be an integral part of Türkiye's expeditionary strike groups centered around the TCG Anadolu LHD and the country's future MUGEM-class aircraft carrier.

The construction of the first Tepe-class destroyer, the first MUGEM-class aircraft carrier, and the first MILDEN-class submarine began in the same day, on January 2, 2025. The first Tepe-class destroyer and the first MUGEM-class aircraft carrier are being built at the Istanbul Naval Shipyard, while the first MILDEN-class submarine is being built at the Gölcük Naval Shipyard. Large capital vessels like the TCG Anadolu and the MUGEM-class aircraft carriers require destroyer escorts to defend them against enemy aircraft, ships and submarines, a duty that will be undertaken by the Tepe-class destroyers.

On 5 December 2007, the Defence Industry Executive Committee approved plans to build six ships of this class (4 fixed, 2 optional). In January 2013, it was announced that Türkiye was planning to acquire a total of 8 Tepe-class destroyers, which was confirmed at the International Defence Industry Fair (IDEF) 2021. With the realization of the project, it is intended to improve the anti-air warfare (AAW) capabilities of the Turkish Navy.

== Description ==
In February 2011, the feasibility studies of the submitted RFI documents were completed, stepping forward to the development of a project model. Preliminary studies and the configuration of the platform were completed by the end of 2024, and the construction of the first ship began on January 2, 2025. The project requires high-level engineering and technology applications and also a long term realisation period with novel project management processes. Meanwhile, in-country development of the main sensor, multi-function phased array radar has been achieved with the aim of maximum local content contribution, in close cooperation with universities, defense industry and national research institutions. With a similar project management approach implemented in the MILGEM project, the entire realisation period of the Tepe-class project also aims to nurture the in-country technology and engineering applications as well as the nationalisation of the critical systems for the national defence industry.

== Development ==
=== Construction ===
The construction of the first Tepe-class destroyer started on 2 January 2025.

=== Armament ===
These warships are multi-mission destroyers able to conduct anti-aircraft warfare (AAW) with SIPER surface-to-air missiles; tactical land strikes with GEZGIN cruise missiles; anti-submarine warfare (ASW) with towed array sonar, anti-submarine rockets, and ASW helicopters; and anti-surface warfare (ASuW) with Atmaca missiles.

The Tepe-class will incorporate almost every technological achievement made by Türkiye in the field of naval systems in the last decade, including an indigenous vertical launch system (VLS) fitted with domestic surface-to-air missiles (SAMs) and Gezgin land-attack cruise missiles (LACMs), as well as directed-energy weapons including high-energy lasers (HELs).

These capabilities would allow the Tepe-class to engage high-value targets at ranges over 1000 kilometres away, using its land-attack cruise missiles, to establish anti-access or area denial zones, with various types of guided munitions ranging from 96 VLS cells, and systems for defending friendly ships against enemy AShMs, using onboard high-energy lasers. The TF-2000s can also act as host platforms for unmanned systems, as they will include up to four missile-toting armed unmanned surface vessels (AUSVs), unmanned aerial vehicles (UAVs) and unmanned underwater vehicles (UUVs). The Tepe-class will also likely be the first Turkish naval ship class to operationally deploy the indigenous Şahi-209 electromagnetic rail gun. The Tepe-class will boast an indigenous 127mm main gun, 1000+km-ranged Gezgin land-attack cruise missiles, 324mm Orka lightweight torpedoes, two Aselsan 35mm Gökdeniz CIWS, two Meteksan Nazar high-energy lasers, chaff decoy systems, two weapon stations for UMTAS anti-tank guided missiles (ATGMs) and four remote weapon stations.

=== Passive defences ===
The class will feature an extensive radar and sensor suite of domestic origin to detect enemy targets, so that missiles can be directed towards them. They will include towed array sonar, multi-function radar, illumination/fire control radar, long range radar and electronic scanning systems.

=== Missiles and guns under evaluation ===
- Atmaca (SSM)
- RIM-156 SM-2 Block IV (SAM)
- RIM-162 Evolved Sea Sparrow Missile (SAM)
- RIM-116 Rolling Airframe Missile (CIWS-PDMS)
- Levent (missile)
- VL ASROC (ASW)
- Gezgin Land Attack (Cruise) Missile
- G-40 Surface To Air Missile
- Hisar-D RF
- SIPER
- Aselsan STAMP
- Electromagnetic Railgun or 127 mm Naval Gun

=== Countermeasures under evaluation ===
- Directed Energy Weapons
- Directional Infrared Counter Measures

=== Sensors under evaluation ===
- ASELSAN ÇAFRAD ÇFR (Çok Fonksiyonlu Radar) / (Multi-function radar)
- ASELSAN ÇAFRAD AYR (Aydınlatma Radarı) / (Illumination/fire-control radar)
- ASELSAN ÇAFRAD UMR (Uzun Menzilli Radar) / (Long range radar)
- ASELSAN ÇAFRAD IFF (Elektronik Taramalı IFF)

=== Aircraft ===
- Sikorsky S-70B Seahawk
- KALKAN VTOL
- Titra Alpin 2

== Ships in the class ==
| Pennant no. | Name | Namesake | Builder | Launched | Commissioned | Status | Note |
|---|---|---|---|---|---|---|---|
| Unnamed | TCG Kocatepe | Kocatepe | Istanbul Naval Shipyard | | | Under Construction | |
| Unnamed | Unnamed | Unnamed | | | | Planned | |
| Unnamed | Unnamed | Unnamed | | | | Planned | |
| Unnamed | Unnamed | Unnamed | | | | Planned | |
| Unnamed | Unnamed | Unnamed | | | | Planned | |
| Unnamed | Unnamed | Unnamed | | | | Planned | |
| Unnamed | Unnamed | Unnamed | | | | Planned | |
| Unnamed | Unnamed | Unnamed | | | | Planned | |

== See also ==
- Guided missile frigate
- Anti-air warfare
- Hisar-class offshore patrol vessel
