= Ada-class corvette =

Turkish anti-submarine ships

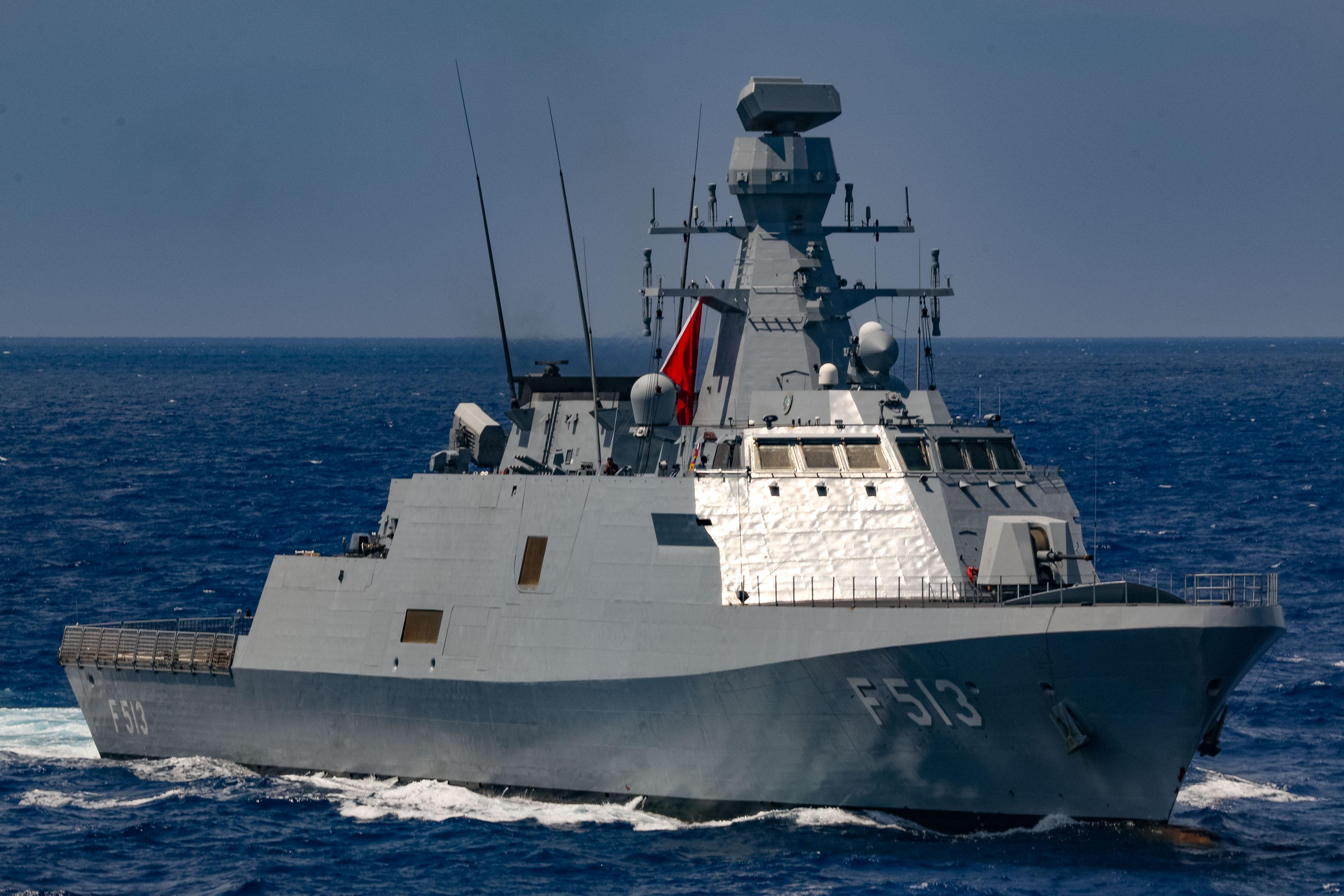
- TCG Burgazada during a Turkish-American naval exercise in the Mediterranean Sea, 26 August 2020

Class overview
- Name: Ada class
- Builders: Istanbul Naval Shipyard; STM; ASFAT
- Operators: Turkish Naval Forces; Pakistan Navy; Ukrainian Navy; Royal Malaysian Navy
- Preceded by: Burak class
- Subclasses: Babur class
- Built: 2005–present
- In service: 2011–present
- Planned: 14
- Completed: 7
- Active: 7

General characteristics
- Type: Corvette
- Displacement: 2,400 tonnes
- Length: 99.56 m (326 ft 8 in)
- Beam: 14.40 m (47 ft 3 in)
- Draft: 3.90 m (12 ft 10 in)
- Installed power: Main: 31,640 kW (42,430 hp) RENK CODAG; Auxiliary: 4 x 588 kW (789 hp)
- Propulsion: 1 gas turbine, 2 diesels, 2 shafts
- Speed: Economy: 15 kn (28 km/h; 17 mph); Maximum: 30 kn (56 km/h; 35 mph)
- Range: 3,500 nmi (6,500 km; 4,000 mi) at 15 kn (28 km/h; 17 mph)
- Endurance: 21 days with logistic support; 10 days autonomous
- Boats & landing craft carried: 2 x RHIB
- Complement: 93 including aviation officers, with accommodation up to 106
- Sensors & processing systems: Combat management system: G-MSYS (GENESIS MİLGEM Savaş Yönetim Sistemi); Search radar: SMART-S Mk2; Weapon control: STING EO Mk2; Sonar: TBT-01 Yakamoz; Communication: SatCom, GPS, LAN, ECDIS/WECDIS, Link 11/16; Navigation: ECPINS-W, ALPER LPI; Integrated platform management system: UniMACS 3000; Others: X-Band radar, Fire control radar
- Electronic warfare & decoys: SIGINT: ARES-2N; Others: Laser/RF systems, ASW jammers, DG, SSTD
- Armament: Guns: 1 × 76 mm (3 in) Oto Melara Super Rapid (retractable for lower radar cross section, guidance by fire control radar and electro-optical systems), A position; 2 × 12.7 mm (0.50 in) Aselsan STAMP Stabilized Machine Gun Platform (guidance by Laser/IR/TV and electro-optical systems, automatic and manual modes), B position; Anti-ship missiles: 8 × Harpoon or Atmaca; Anti-aircraft warfare: 1 × RAM Block I; Torpedoes: 2 × 324 mm (13 in) Mk.32 twin launchers for Mk.46 torpedoes; Torpedo defence system: Sea Sentor Surface Ship Torpedo Defense System
- Aircraft carried: Hangar and platform for: S-70B Seahawk ASW helicopters; Unmanned aerial vehicles (UAV)
- Aviation facilities: Capability of storing armaments, 20 tons of JP-5 aircraft fuel, aerial refueling (HIRF) and maintenance systems

The Ada class is a class of anti-submarine warfare corvettes developed primarily for the Turkish Navy during the first stage of the MILGEM project. The Turkish Navy has commissioned all four Ada-class corvettes.

The SIGINT ship TCG Ufuk and Hisar-class offshore patrol vessels are variants of the Ada-class corvette that use the same hull and superstructure design but feature different types of systems, armament and equipment.

== Development ==
The Ada class was engineered for the purpose of building a national corvette with anti-submarine warfare and high-seas patrol capabilities, while using the principles of low observability in its materials and design. The design concept and mission profile of the Ada-class corvette bears similarities to the Freedom-class littoral combat ship of the U.S. Navy. The Ada-class corvettes are more heavily armed and are equipped with more capable radar and sonar systems, while the Freedom class has a higher speed and variable mission modules.

According to the Ada-class acquisition model, Turkey's Undersecretariat for Defense Industries (SSM) signed R&D contracts for two prototype ships considered to be testing platforms. Thus, being an open-end project, first and second ships of the class were expected to be slightly different in terms of vessel design and system configuration. The subsequent vessels, scheduled to be built by private shipyards, would have a more optimized design and configuration.

All four ships of the series, TCG Heybeliada, TCG Büyükada, TCG Burgazada and TCG Kınalıada were built by the Istanbul Naval Shipyard. The construction works of the lead ship, TCG Heybeliada commenced on 26 July 2005. Heybeliada was launched with a ceremony attended by Prime Minister of Turkey Recep Tayyip Erdoğan on 27 September 2008. On 2 November 2010, Heybeliada initiated sea acceptance trials in the Sea of Marmara. Heybeliada entered navy service on 27 September 2011. The cost of Heybeliada was reported around US$260 million.

The production of the second ship of the class, TCG Büyükada, commenced on 27 September 2008. Büyükada was expected to incorporate weapon systems with notable performance, such as the ASELSAN air-search radar. Büyükada was launched on 27 September 2011 and underwent sea acceptance trials before it was officially commissioned on 27 September 2013. In September 2013, then Prime Minister Recep Tayyip Erdoğan announced that the Ada class was to be temporarily put on hold after the completion of the first two corvettes by the Istanbul Naval Shipyard, and that the bid won by RMK Marine to build six more corvettes was canceled. Motives behind this decision was reported other shipbuilders complaining about the bidding process. He added that a new bidding process would take place. Construction of TCG Burgazada commenced on 17 December 2014. The ship was launched in June 2016 and commissioned on 4 November 2018. Turkish Naval Forces Command (TNFC) received its fourth and last Ada-class corvette, TCG Kinaliada (F-514) on 29 September 2019, in the commissioning ceremony held at the Istanbul Naval Shipyard.

On 4 November 2019, the Defense Industries Administration (SSB) of Turkey announced that Turkey's ASW corvette TCG Kinaliada, successfully test-fired Atmaca anti-ship cruise missile. Turkish Navy plans to replace the inventory of Harpoon ASM by 2022.

== Characteristics ==
The class vessels are propelled by a RENK CODAG cross-connect propulsion plant. It consists of a gas turbine rated at 23,000 kilowatts (31,000 hp) and two diesel engines rated at 4,320 kW (5,790 hp). Each diesel engine drives one controllable pitch propeller via a two-speed main reduction gear. The cross-connect gear splits the power from the gas turbine via both main reduction gears to the two shafts. The ship can be operated in diesel mode, in single gas turbine mode or in CODAG mode. CODAG is where diesel and gas turbine engines are providing combined power (27,320 kW).

GENESIS (Gemi Entegre Savaş İdare Sistemi, i.e., Ship Integrated Combat Management System), a network-centric warfare management system developed by HAVELSAN and initially used in the upgraded G-class frigates of the Turkish Navy, was contracted for the first two corvettes on 23 May 2007. In the last Ada-class corvette, Kınalıada, the ADVENT combat management system (an upgraded version of GENESIS) is installed instead of GENESIS system. It is also planned for Burgazada to be retrofitted with the ADVENT combat management system. The class ships have a national hull mounted sonar developed by the Scientific and Technological Research Council of Turkey. The sonar dome has been developed by STM's subcontractor ONUK-BG Defence Systems, extensively employing nano-enhanced Fiber Reinforced Polymer. The Ada class features an Electronic Chart Precise Integrated Navigation System (ECPINS), supplied by OSI Geospatial. Integrated Platform Management System (IPMS) for controlling machinery, auxiliary systems, power generation and distribution was delivered by STM's subcontractor Yaltes JV. Main systems integrated to IPMS are power management system, fire detection system, fire fighting, damage control system, CCTV system and stability control system.

== Naming ==
"Ada" means island in Turkish. Each individual ship of the class is named for a Turkish island, in particular the Prince Islands in the Sea of Marmara to the southeast of Istanbul. The lead ship of the class, TCG Heybeliada, is named after Heybeliada island, where the Turkish Naval High School is located.

== Ships in the class ==
=== Turkish Naval Forces ===
Pennant number	Name	Namesake	Builder	Laid down	Launched	Commissioned	Status
F-511	Heybeliada	Heybeliada	Istanbul Naval Shipyard	26 July 2005	27 September 2008	27 September 2011	Active
F-512	Büyükada	Büyükada	Istanbul Naval Shipyard	27 September 2008	27 September 2011	27 September 2013	Active
F-513	Burgazada	Burgazada	Istanbul Naval Shipyard	17 December 2014	21 June 2016	4 November 2018	Active
F-514	Kınalıada	Kinaliada	Istanbul Naval Shipyard	8 October 2015	3 July 2017	29 September 2019	Active
A-591	Ufuk	Horizon	Istanbul Naval Shipyard	9 February 2017	9 February 2019	14 January 2022	Active

=== Pakistan Navy ===
Pennant number	Name	Builder	Laid down	Launched	Commissioned	Status
F280	Babur	Istanbul Naval Shipyard (INSY)	4 June 2020	15 August 2021	23 September 2023	Active
F282	Khaibar	Istanbul Naval Shipyard (INSY)	1 May 2021	25 November 2022	21 December 2025	Active
F281	Badr	Karachi Shipyard & Engineering Works (KSEW)	25 October 2020	20 May 2022	June 2026 (expected)	Launched
F283	Tariq	Karachi Shipyard & Engineering Works (KSEW)	5 November 2021	2 August 2023	Q1 2027 (expected)	Launched

=== Ukrainian Navy ===
Pennant number	Name	Namesake	Builder	Laid down	Launched	Commissioned	Status
F211	Hetman Ivan Mazepa	Ivan Mazepa	STM	7 September 2021	2 October 2022		Sea trials
F212	Hetman Ivan Vyhovskyi	Ivan Vyhovskyi	STM	18 August 2023	1 August 2024		Launched

=== Royal Malaysian Navy ===
Pennant number	Name	Builder	Laid down	Launched	Commissioned	Status
141	Tunku Laksamana Abdul Jalil	STM	4 December 2024	24 May 2026		Fitting out
142	Raja Laut	STM	TBA	7 June 2026		Fitting out
143	Tunku Osman Jewa	STM	TBA	9 August 2026		Fitting out

== Export ==
In 2018, Pakistan contracted ASFAT for the construction of Ada class for Pakistan Navy. This deal includes transfer of technology to Pakistan.

The Ukrainian Ministry of Defense has ordered two corvettes for Ukrainian Navy with construction to be performed jointly by the Turkish STM and Ukrainian shipyard. Under the deal, the first vessel will be delivered to Ukraine by the end of 2023 unfinished, to then be completed in Ukraine. The deal was signed in December 2020 worth $256 million.

In 2022, STM proposed the Ada class to the Royal Malaysian Navy for their Littoral Mission Ship (LMS) Batch 2 program. In June 2024, Malaysia officially placed an order for three ships. The corvettes will be armed with a 76 mm naval gun, Aselsan SMASH 30 mm gun, four quad pack vertical launching systems for a total of 16 surface-to-air missiles (probably K-SAAM) and eight Atmaca anti-ship missiles on each ship.

In Aselsan 2023 annual report was stated that four Ada class were exported to an unnamed Middle Eastern country.

== See also ==
- TF2000-class destroyer
- Istanbul-class frigate
- Jinnah-class frigate

Equivalent modern corvettes

- Diponegoro-class – (Netherlands)
- Steregushchiy-class – (Russia)
- Kamorta-class – (India)
- Braunschweig-class – (Germany)
- Sa'ar 6-class – (Israel)
- Pohjanmaa-class – (Finland)
