= TCG Burgazada =

2016 Ada-class corvette of the Turkish Navy

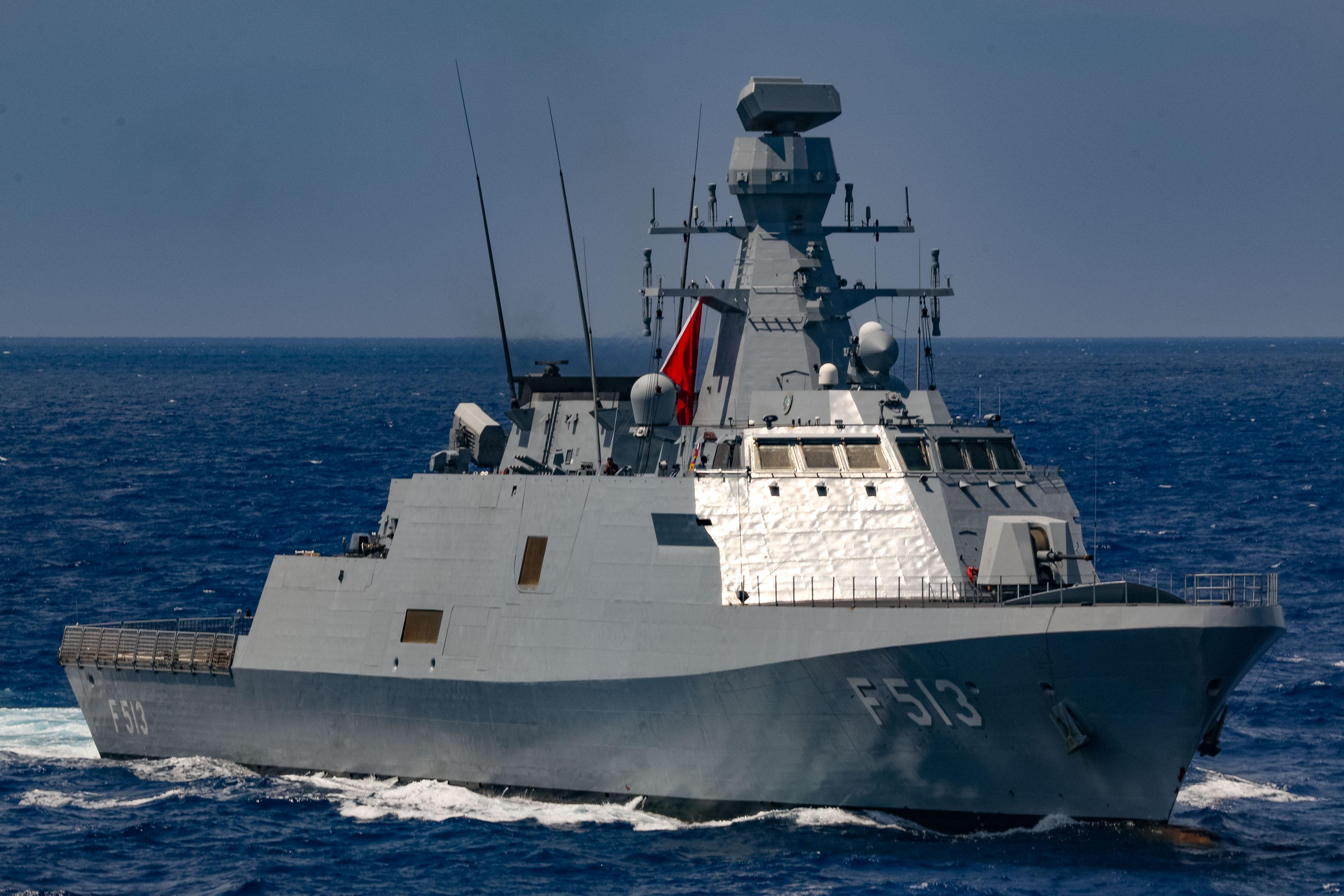
- TCG Burgazada during joint exercise in the Eastern Mediterranean, 26 August 2020

History

Turkey
- Name: Burgazada
- Namesake: Burgazada
- Laid down: 17 December 2014
- Launched: 21 June 2016
- Commissioned: 4 November 2018
- Identification: Pennant number: F-513; MMSI number: 519031777
- Status: in active service, as of 2018

General characteristics
- Class & type: Ada-class corvette
- Displacement: 2,300 long tons (2,340 t)
- Length: 99.56 m (326.6 ft)
- Beam: 14.40 m (47.2 ft)
- Draft: 3.89 m (12.8 ft)
- Installed power: 31,640 kW (42,430 shp) (CODAG)
- Propulsion: 1 gas turbine, 2 diesels, 2 shafts
- Speed: Economy 15 kn (28 km/h; 17 mph); Maximum 29 kn (54 km/h; 33 mph)
- Range: 3,500 nmi (6,480 km) at 15 knots
- Endurance: 21 days with logistic support; 10 days autonomous
- Complement: 93 including aviation officers, with accommodation for up to 106
- Sensors & processing systems: GENESIS CMS; SMART-S Mk2 search radar; Sonar, GPS, LAN, ECDIS; UniMACS 3000 IPMS; X-band radar, Fire control radar
- Electronic warfare & decoys: Aselsan ARES-2N Others: Laser/RF systems, ASW jammers, SSTD
- Armament: Guns: 1 × 76 mm (3 in) OTO Melara Super Rapid; 2 × 12.7 mm Aselsan STAMP; Anti-surface missiles: 8 × Atmaca; Anti-aircraft missiles: 21 × RAM (PDMS); Torpedoes: 2 × 324 mm Mk.32 triple launchers for Mk.46 torpedoes
- Aviation facilities: Hangar and platform for: S-70B Seahawk ASW helicopters; Kalkan VTOL carrying Skydagger's RTF 7X FPV
- Notes: Capability of storing armaments, 20 tons of JP-5 aircraft fuel, aerial refueling (HIRF) and maintenance systems

TCG Burgazada (F-513) is an Ada-class ASW corvette of the Turkish Navy, built as the third combat ship of the MILGEM project. Burgazada was named after Burgazada Island, which is part of the Prince Islands archipelago in the Sea of Marmara, to the southeast of Istanbul.

The construction of TCG Burgazada began on 17 December 2014 at the Istanbul Naval Shipyard as the third combat ship of the MILGEM project. She was launched on 21 June 2016. After outfitting works, sea trials began in March 2018, and she was commissioned on 4 November 2018.

TCG Burgazada features a landing platform for ASW/ASuW helicopters and is teamed with Atmaca anti-surface missiles and a 76 mm (3 in) OTO Melara Super Rapid gun. She is also equipped with the indigenously-developed combat management system GENESIS.
