= TCG Büyükada =

2011 Ada-class corvette

History

Turkey
- Name: TCG Büyükada
- Namesake: Büyükada
- Laid down: 22 January 2008
- Launched: 27 September 2011
- Commissioned: 27 September 2013
- Identification: F-512
- Status: in active service

General characteristics
- Class & type: Ada-class corvette
- Displacement: 2,300 tonnes
- Length: 99.56 m (326.6 ft)
- Beam: 14.40 m (47.2 ft)
- Draught: 3.89 m (12.8 ft)
- Installed power: 30,000 kW (CODAG)
- Propulsion: 1 gas turbine, 2 diesels, 2 shafts
- Speed: Economy 15 knots (28 km/h); Maximum 29 knots (54 km/h)
- Range: 3,500 nautical miles (6,480 km) at 15 knots
- Endurance: 21 days with logistic support; 10 days autonomous
- Complement: 93 including aviation officers, with accommodation for up to 106
- Sensors & processing systems: GENESIS CMS; SMART-S Mk2 search radar; Sonar, GPS, LAN, ECDIS; UniMACS 3000 IPMS; X-band radar, Fire control radar
- Electronic warfare & decoys: Aselsan ARES-2N Others: Laser/RF systems, ASW jammers, SSTD
- Armament: Guns: 1 × 76 mm OtoMelara Super Rapid; 2 × 20 mm Aselsan STAMP; Anti-surface missiles: 8 × Harpoon Block II SSM BB; Anti-aircraft missiles: 21 × RAM (PDMS); Torpedoes: 2 × 324 mm Mk.32 triple launchers for Mk.46 torpedoes
- Aviation facilities: Hangar and platform for: S-70B Seahawk ASW helicopters; Unmanned aerial vehicles (UAV)
- Notes: Capability of storing armaments, 20 tons of JP-5 aircraft fuel, aerial refueling (HIRF) and maintenance systems

TCG Büyükada (F-512) is the second ship of the Ada-class ASW corvettes of the Turkish Navy. TCG Büyükada was named after Büyükada Island, which is part of the Prince Islands archipelago in the Sea of Marmara, to the southeast of Istanbul. Its sister ship is TCG Heybeliada.

Designed, developed, and built by the Tuzla (Istanbul) Naval Shipyard as a part of the MILGEM project, it was laid down on 22 January 2008, launched on 27 September 2011, and commissioned on 27 September 2013.

== History ==
In 2015, she completed a three-month voyage, visiting ports in Saudi Arabia, Yemen, Pakistan, Qatar, Kuwait, Bahrain, Sudan, and Djibouti. She was also involved in the successful evacuation of 55 Turkish citizens from Yemen.

On 13 June 2025, Büyükada arrived at the Port of Colombo, Sri Lanka on a formal visit. The vessel departed the island on 16 June.
