= MİDLAS =

Naval verticle (missile) launching system

MiDLAS vertical launching system
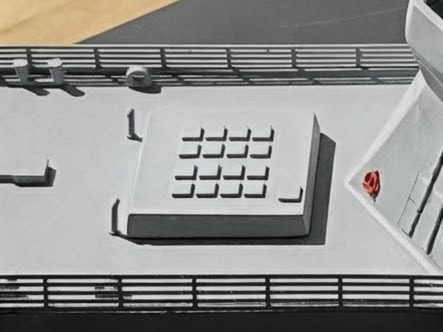
- Scale model layout of the MiDLAS VLS in Istanbul-class frigate
- Type: Missile launching system
- Place of origin: Turkey

Service history
- Used by: Turkish Naval Forces

Production history
- Designed: 2020s
- Manufacturer: Roketsan

MiDLAS (an acronym for Milli Dikey Atım Lançer Sistemi; English: National Vertical Launch System) is a vertical launching system (VLS) developed and manufactured by the Turkish defense contractor Roketsan for the Turkish Navy. It is designed to store and fire a variety of guided missiles, including surface-to-air, surface-to-surface, and anti-submarine warfare missiles from naval surface combatants and potentially submarines. The system was developed as a domestic alternative to the American Mark 41 VLS following export restrictions. It was first integrated into the TCG İstanbul (F-515), the lead ship of the Istanbul-class frigates. The VLS system is also offered for export.

== Development ==
The development of MIDLAS began to ensure the independence of the Turkish Navy's strike capabilities. While the Ada-class corvettes were designed without a vertical launch system, the subsequent Istanbul-class frigate program initially planned to utilize the US-made Mk 41 VLS. However, following the imposition of CAATSA sanctions by the United States on Turkey in 2020, the procurement of the Mk 41 became restricted. In response, Roketsan accelerated the development of a domestic launcher that could interface with the Turkish-designed ADVENT combat management system.

- First Ground Test: On December 3, 2022, Roketsan successfully conducted the first firing test of the system from a ground-based test rig using a Hisar-O missile.
- First Sea Trial: On March 12, 2024, the system was successfully tested aboard TCG İstanbul (F-515), firing a navalized Hisar-D missile.
- First Interception: In August 2025, the system successfully intercepted a Banshee Jet 80+ target drone using a Hisar-D RF missile fired from TCG İstanbul.

== Design and specifications ==
MiDLAS is a modular, below-deck launching system featuring an open architecture that allows for the integration of various missile types. It uses a canister-based storage method, where missiles are loaded into individual cells. The system is designed to support both "hot launch" (where the missile ignites within the cell) and "cold launch" (where the missile is ejected by gas before ignition) techniques, although current integrations primarily utilize hot launch. The system communicates with the ship's combat management system via Ethernet, specifically the Turkish Navy's network-enabled ADVENT system.

=== Configurations ===
Roketsan produces MIDLAS in two primary vertical configurations, along with single-cell variants for flexible deployment:

- Tactical Version: Designed for medium-range air defense and anti-ship missiles.
  - Height: 6.7 meters
  - Weight: 15,000 kg (per 8-cell module)
  - Compatible Missiles: Hisar-D, Atmaca, Siper Block 1-D
- Strike Version: Designed for long-range area air defense and land-attack cruise missiles.
  - Height: 8.0 meters
  - Weight: 18,000 kg (per 8-cell module)
  - Compatible Missiles: Siper Block 2-D, Gezgin cruise missile.

A standard module consists of 8 cells with a footprint of approximately 6 square meters. The system supports "quad-packing," potentially allowing up to 32 smaller missiles to be carried in an 8-cell module.

== Integrated Missiles ==
MIDLAS is designed to be compatible with a wide range of indigenous Turkish missiles:

- Hisar-D RF: Medium-range air defense missile (Naval version of Hisar-O+).
- Siper Block 1-D: Long-range surface-to-air missile (Range: 100+ km).
- Siper Block 2-D: Extended-range surface-to-air missile (150+ km).
- Atmaca: Anti-ship cruise missile.
- Gezgin missile: Planned land-attack cruise missile.
- Tayfun: Short-range ballistic missile (planned for submarine or large surface combatant integration).

== Platforms ==
=== Current Operators ===
- Turkey
  - Istanbul-class frigate: The lead ship, TCG İstanbul, is equipped with a 16-cell Tactical MIDLAS configuration.
- Indonesia
  - Balaputradewa-class frigate: The export variant of the Arrowhead 140 design being built by PT PAL is planned to feature a 64-cell MiDLAS configuration.

=== Future Operators and Plans ===
- Turkey
  - TF-2000-class destroyer: Planned to carry a 96-cell MiDLAS configuration utilizing both Tactical and Strike length modules.
  - Atılay-class submarine: The future Turkish submarine project aims to incorporate a submarine-specific variant of MiDLAS.
