= Ukrainian corvette Hetman Ivan Mazepa =

Ukrainian Ada-class Corvette

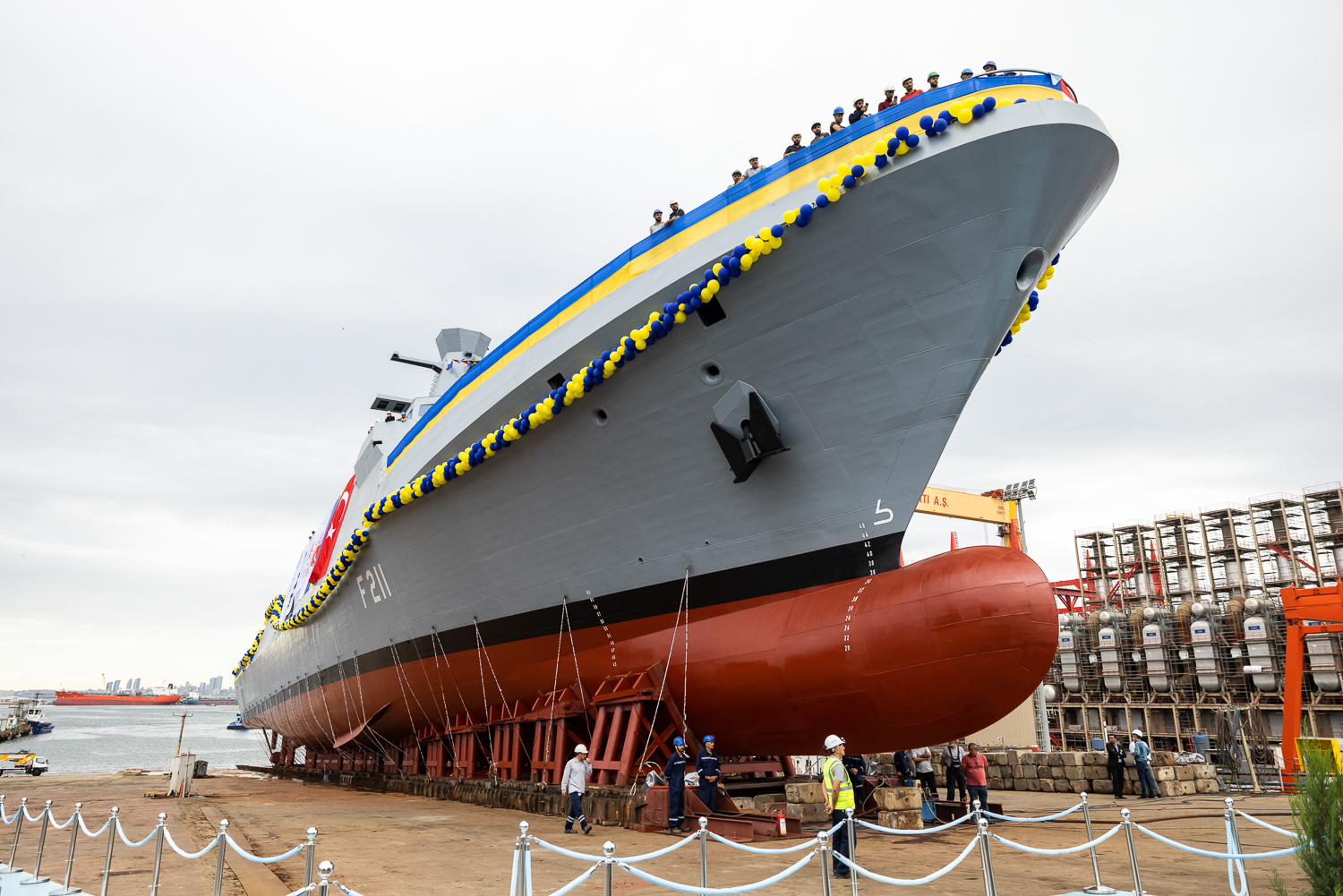
- Ukrainian corvette Hetman Ivan Mazepa during the launch ceremony, 2022

History

Ukraine
- Name: Hetman Ivan Mazepa
- Namesake: Ivan Mazepa
- Builder: RMK Marine shipyard, Tuzla, Turkey
- Laid down: 7 September 2021
- Launched: 2 October 2022
- Sponsored by: Olena Zelenska
- Identification: F211
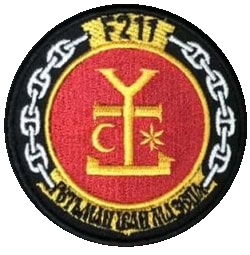
- Badge

General characteristics
- Class & type: Ada-class corvette
- Displacement: 2,300 long tons (2,300 t)
- Length: 99.56 m (326 ft 8 in)
- Beam: 14.40 m (47 ft 3 in)
- Draft: 3.89 m (12 ft 9 in)
- Installed power: 31,640 kW (42,430 shp) (CODAG)
- Propulsion: 1 gas turbine, 2 diesels, 2 shafts
- Speed: Economy 15 kn (28 km/h; 17 mph); Maximum 29 kn (54 km/h; 33 mph)
- Range: 3,500 nmi (6,500 km; 4,000 mi) at 15 knots
- Endurance: 21 days with logistic support; 10 days autonomous
- Complement: 93 including aviation officers, with accommodation for up to 106
- Sensors & processing systems: GENESIS CMS; SMART-S Mk2 search radar; Sonar, GPS, LAN, ECDIS; UniMACS 3000 IPMS; X-band radar, Fire control radar
- Electronic warfare & decoys: Aselsan ARES-2N Others: Laser/RF systems, ASW jammers, SSTD
- Armament: Guns: 1 × 76 mm (3 in) OTO Melara Super Rapid; 1 x 35 mm Aselsan GOKDENIZ; 2 × 12.7 mm Aselsan STAMP; Anti-surface missiles: 8 × Harpoon; Anti-aircraft missiles: 2 x 4-cell VLS for 8 VL MICA-M; Torpedoes: 2 × 324 mm MU90 torpedoes
- Aviation facilities: Hangar and platform for: S-70B Seahawk ASW helicopters; Unmanned aerial vehicles (UAV)
- Notes: Capability of storing armaments, 20 tons of JP-5 aircraft fuel, aerial refueling (HIRF) and maintenance systems

Hetman Ivan Mazepa (F211) is an Ada-class anti-submarine corvette of the Ukrainian Navy currently undergoing sea trials. The ship is named after Ivan Mazepa, a Ukrainian Cossack leader who turned against the Tsardom of Russia of Peter the Great and joined the side of Charles XII of Sweden during the Swedish Invasion of Russia.

The ship was officially laid down on 7 September 2021, and launched on 2 October 2022. When completed, the vessel will be the flagship of the Ukrainian Navy, and will be the first modern combat vessel of the service.

== Development ==
=== Context ===
At the time of its modern inception in the 1990s, the Ukrainian Navy primarily consisted of naval vessels inherited from the Soviet Black Sea Fleet and Soviet Border Troops. These included Project 1135 Burevestnik frigates, Project 1124 Al'batros corvettes, Project 206MR Vikhr missile boats, and a number of other blue and brown water ships and auxiliary vessels. These ships were maintained and operated in close cooperation with the newly reconstituted Russian Federation, who had inherited the remainder of the Black Sea Fleet. However, the severe state of the Ukrainian economy in the years after independence resulted in the scrapping or sale of many vessels.

=== Cooperation with Turkey ===
A revolution occurred at the beginning of 2014 in Ukraine, which deposed the pro-Russian government of Viktor Yanukovych. This resulted in a deterioration of relations between the new Ukrainian government and Russia, and further led to the Annexation of Crimea by the Russian Federation, which resulted in the seizure of the majority of the Ukrainian Navy, including major ships such as the corvettes Lutsk and Ternopil. The loss of the vast majority of these ships constituted a significant reduction in the combat capabilities of the Ukrainian Navy. As such, it became necessary to acquire new ships. As part of these efforts, a memorandum was signed with Turkey which included both the purchase of Baykar Bayraktar TB2 attack drones and the construction of two corvettes, with an option for two more.

In December 2020, the head of the Turkish Defense Industry Department, Ismail Demir, signed an agreement with the Ministry of Defence of Ukraine on the construction of two corvettes of the Turkish MILGEM project (type Ada) for the Ukrainian Navy. Both corvettes were to be built in Turkey at the RMK Marine shipyard in Tuzla, Istanbul. The main contractor was envisioned to be the Turkish state design company Savunma Teknolojileri Mühendislik ve Ticaret A.Ş. The cost of the first Ukrainian ship in class was estimated at approximately 8 billion hryvnia, without taking into account the fitout of weapons. Furthermore, two or three more corvettes were to be built under license in Ukraine at the Okean Shipyard in Mykolaiv.

=== Proposed Armament ===
Radio Free Europe/Radio Liberty claimed on 9 August 2021, that the Ukraine Defence Ministry had revealed the weapon systems for the corvettes. The corvette would reportedly be equipped with American RGM-84 Harpoon anti-ship missiles. The Ukrainian developed R-360 Neptun, the Turkish ATMACA, and the Norwegian Naval Strike Missile had been other contenders. Statements at the time suggested the installation of Rheinmetall Oerlikon’s Millennium CIWS, but later image renders show the Aselsan-made Gokdeniz CIWS. French MICA missiles, launched from a VLS would be installed for air defence purposes. An OTO Melara 76 mm gun and 12.7 mm STAMP gun would be mounted. The primary ASW weapons was considered to be the MU90 torpedo.

== Construction ==
=== Launch ===
Construction of the ship began on 28 April 2021, with the official keel laying ceremony taking place on 7 September 2021. The ship was launched by First Lady of Ukraine, Olena Zelenska on 2 October 2022. The Turkish Defence Minister Hulusi Akar attended the ceremony, along with President of Defence Industry Agency (SSB) Professor İsmail Demir, STM General Manager Özgür Güleryüz and Vice Admiral of the Ukrainian Navy Oleksiy Neizhpapa.

It was initially planned that the ship would be towed to Ukraine to complete its fitting out by the end of 2022 and in 2023, the corvette was planned to be fitted out, before sea trials could begin. However, due to the blockade of the Ukrainian coast by the Russian Black Sea Fleet following the February 2022 Russian invasion of Ukraine, the fate of these plans remains unknown and the ship would likely be completed in Turkey.

=== Naming ===
On the decree of Ukrainian president Volodymyr Zelenskyy, the ship is named after Ivan Mazepa, a prominent Ukrainian Cossack leader who turned against the Tsardom of Russia led by Peter the Great and joined the side of Charles XII of Sweden during the Swedish Invasion of Russia. Following the scuttling of the Project 1135 frigate Hetman Sahaidachny, Ivan Mazepa is slated to become the flagship of the Ukrainian Navy.

=== Sea trials ===
The ship was spotted in the Sea of Marmara on 30 May 2024, conducting sea trials.

== Gallery ==
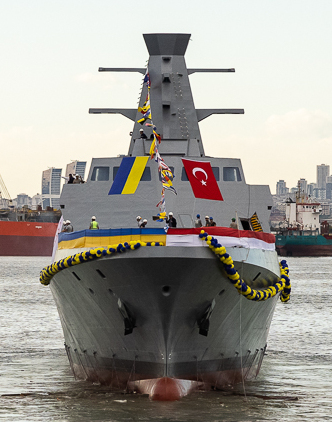
Launching of the corvette, 2 October 2022

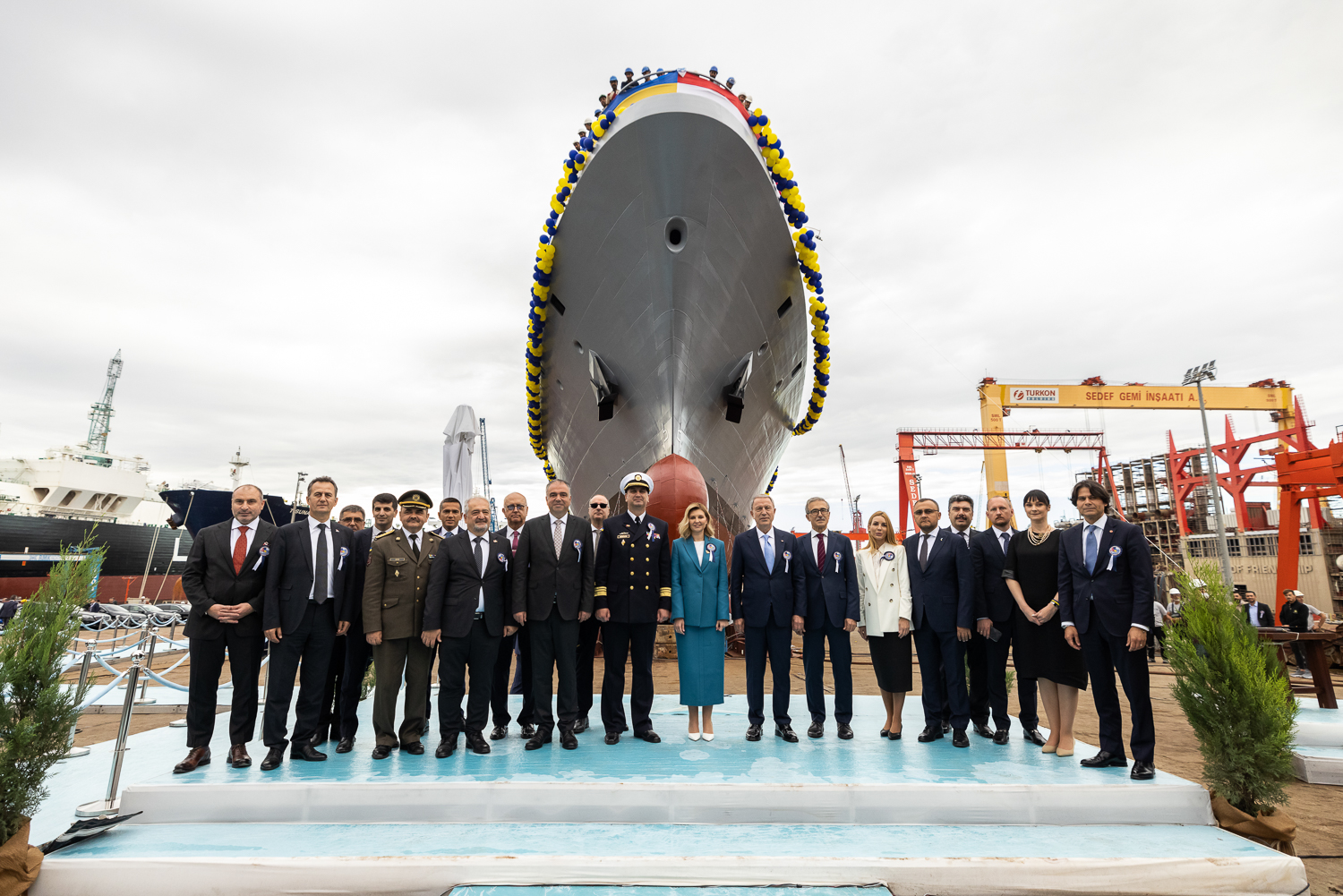
The Turko-Ukrainian delegation during the launch of the Ukrainian corvette Hetman Ivan Mazepa

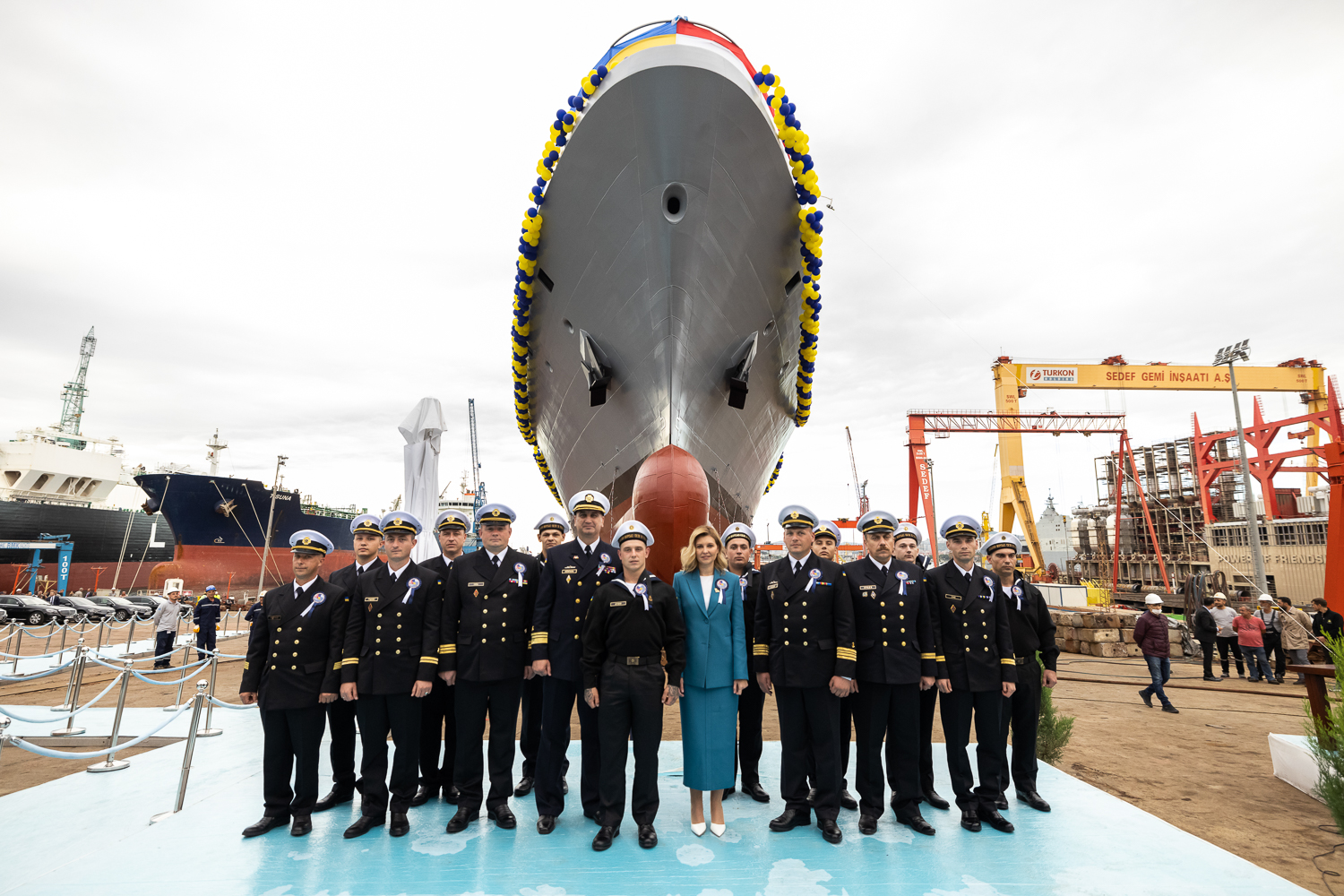
First Lady Zelenska with naval officers at the launch of the corvette

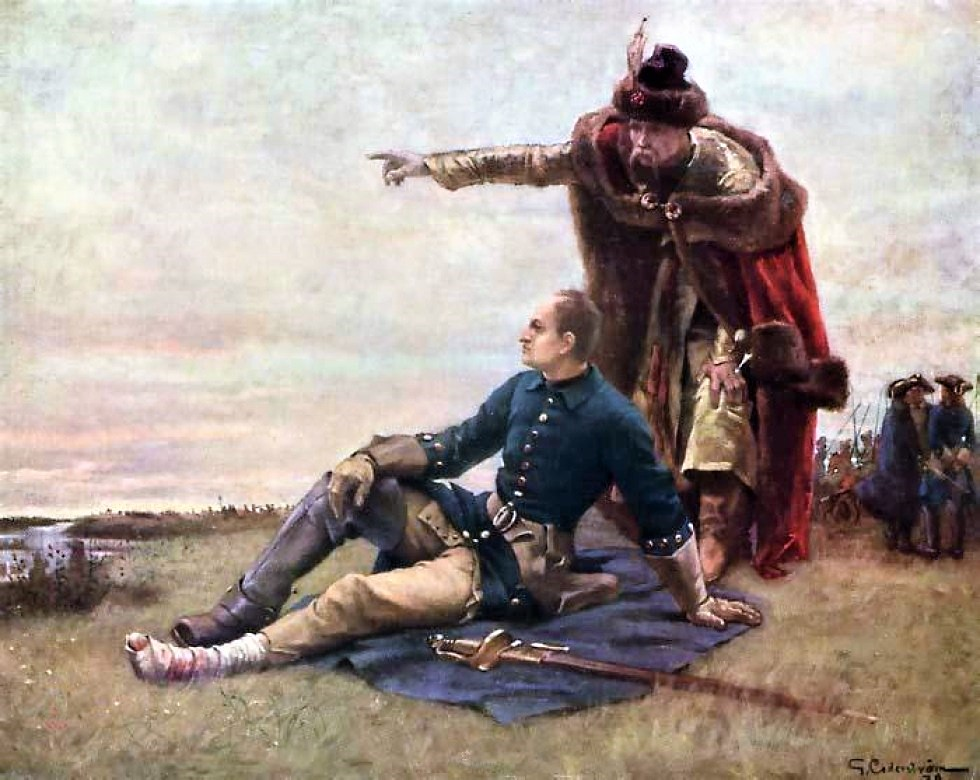
Namesake of the ship - Ivan Mazepa (right) alongside Charles XII of Sweden after defeat at the Battle of Poltava.
