= PNS Khaibar (2025) =

Pakistani corvette

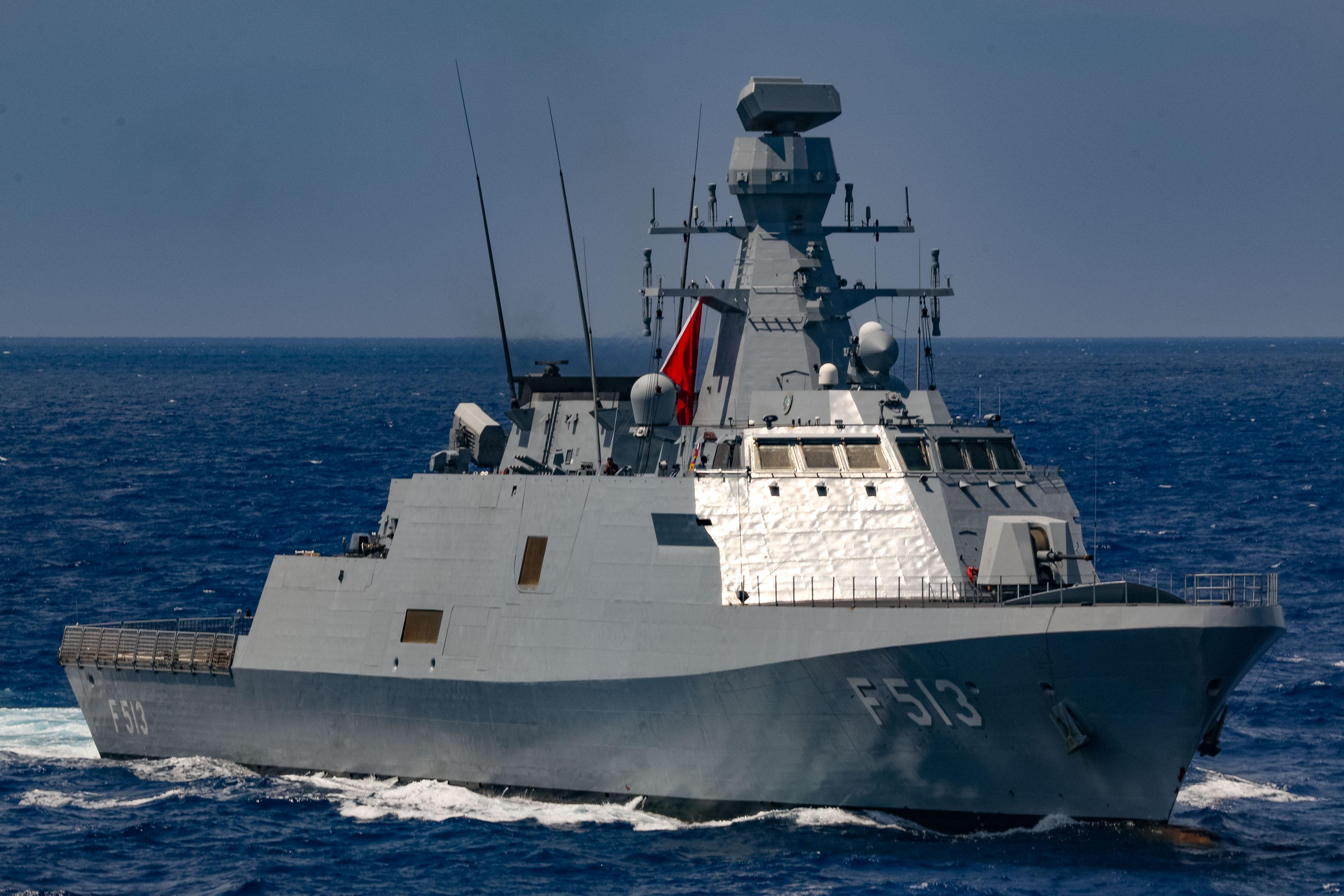
- PNS Khaiber shares the same baseline design with the Ada-class corvettes.

History

Pakistan
- Name: PNS Khaibar
- Namesake: Battle of Khaybar
- Status: In active service

General characteristics
- Type: Multi-purpose corvette
- Displacement: 2,400 tons
- Length: 99.5 meters
- Beam: 14.4m
- Draft: 3.90 m (12 ft 10 in)
- Installed power: 2 × MTU 16V 595 TE90; 1 × General Electric LM2500
- Propulsion: CODAG
- Speed: 29 knots (54 km/h; 33 mph) (Maximum)
- Range: 3,500 nmi (6,500 km; 4,000 mi)
- Endurance: 15 days
- Sensors & processing systems: Combat Suite :-; HAVELSAN GENESİS ADVENT Combat Management System (CMS); Radar :-; Aselsan SMART-S Mk2 S-Band 3D radar; Aselsan ALPER LPI radar; Aselsan AKREP (AKR-D Block B-1/2) fire-control radar; Northrop Grumman LN-270 INS/GPS navigation system; Sonar :-; Meteksan YAKAMOS hull-mounted sonar; Tracking Systems :-; Aselsan SeaEye-AHTAPOT electro-optical surveillance system; Aselsan PIRI infrared search and track system (IRST); Data Links :-; MilSOFT Naval Information Exchange System (NIXS) C4I; Pakistan-developed "Link Green" tactical data link
- Electronic warfare & decoys: Aselsan ARES-2NC Radar ESM
- Armament: Anti-air warfare :-; 12 × Albatross NG (CAMM-ER) surface-to-air missiles launcher; Anti-surface warfare :-; 2 × triple-cell missile launchers, for 6 P-282 SMASH anti-ship missiles; Anti-submarine warfare :-; 2 × 3-cell Mark 32 324 mm lightweight torpedo tubes; Guns :-; 1 × OTO Melara 76 mm naval gun; 1 × Aselsan GOKDENIZ 35 mm CIWS; 2 × Aselsan STOP 25 mm remote weapon stations; Decoys :-; Aselsan HIZIR torpedo-countermeasure system
- Aviation facilities: Flight deck with enclosed aviation hangar, for 1 anti-submarine helicopter (presumably the AgustaWestland AW159 Wildcat)
- Notes: Pakistan-specific variant of Ada-class corvette

PNS Khaibar (F282) is the second Babur-class corvette that was built for the Pakistan Navy. The ship was commissioned into service on 21 December 2025. Khaibar is the second Babur-class ship to be commissioned, while the remaining two ships are scheduled for 2026 and 2027 respectively. The corvette class is heavier and larger than the Turkish Ada-class corvette from which it has been developed from and is also equipped with Vertical launching systems.

== History ==
Khaibar was laid down on 25th October 2020 and launched on 25 November 2022. She was delivered and commissioned into the Pakistani navy on 21 December 2025. She is equipped with advanced Command and Control Systems along with modern weapons and advanced sensors.The Ship was handed over by Turkish President Recep Tayyip Erdoğan.

== See also ==
- PNS Khaibar
