= TCG Ufuk =

Turkish signals intelligence gathering vessel

History

Turkey
- Name: Ufuk
- Launched: February 2019
- Commissioned: January 2022
- Identification: Pennant number: A591
- Status: In active service

General characteristics
- Type: Signals intelligence gathering vessel
- Displacement: 2,250 tons
- Length: 99.5 m (326 ft 5 in)
- Beam: 14.4 m (47 ft 3 in)
- Speed: 18 knots (33 km/h; 21 mph)

TCG Ufuk (A-591) is a signals intelligence gathering vessel of the Turkish Navy. It was built as part of the MILGEM project, featuring an Ada-class corvette hull. It specializes in electronic intelligence gathering, a role previously filled by smaller intelligence boats.

Construction of the vessel began on 9 February 2019, and it was commissioned on 14 January 2022. Displacing 2,250 tons, it can accommodate a crew of 110 and operate continuously for 60 days.
