= TCG Heybeliada =

Turkish lead ship of Ada-class corvettes

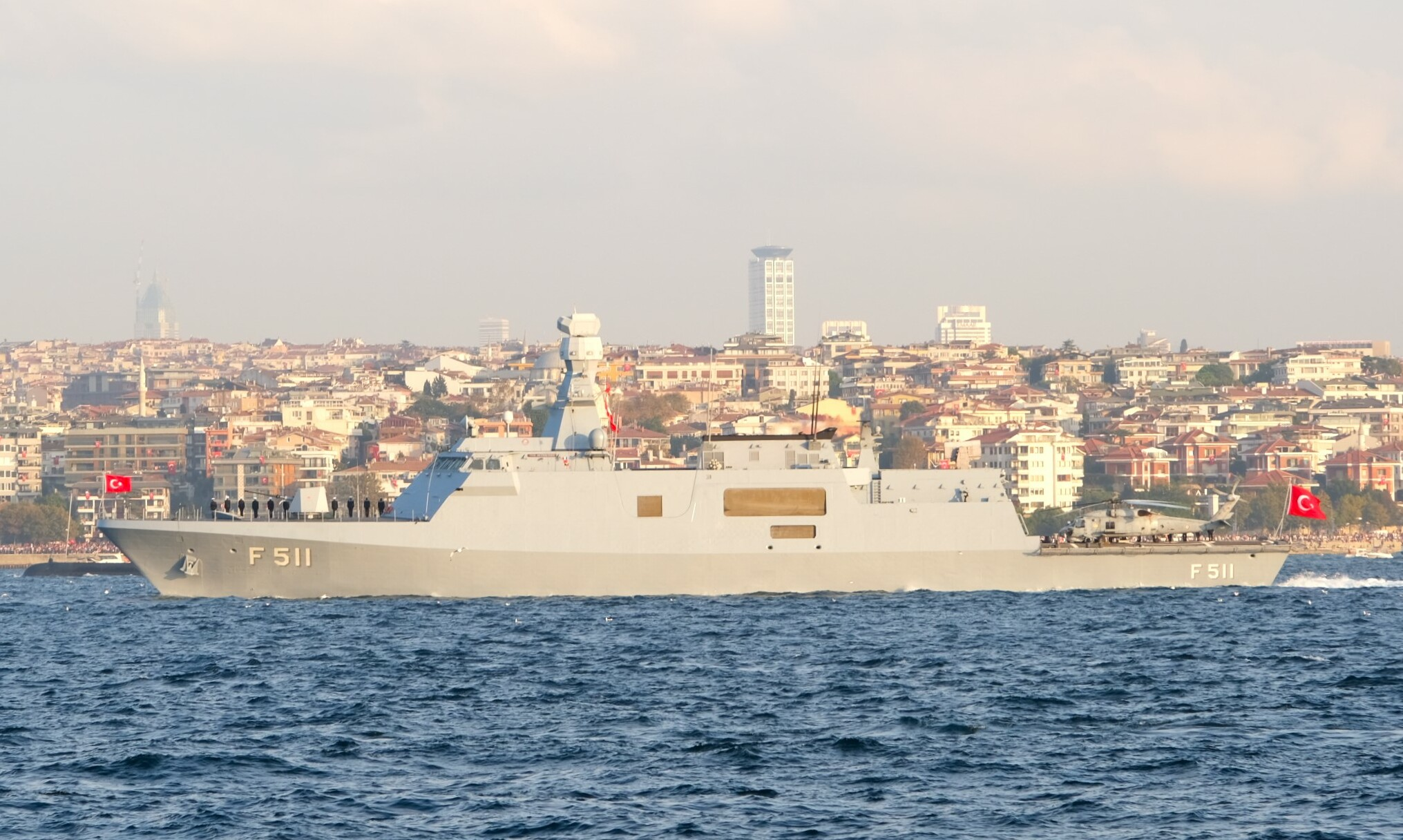
- TCG Heybeliada on the Bosphorus as part of the centennial ceremony of the Republic, 29 October 2023

History

Turkey
- Name: Heybeliada
- Namesake: Heybeliada
- Laid down: 22 January 2007
- Launched: 27 September 2008
- Commissioned: 27 September 2011
- Identification: Pennant number: F 511
- Nickname(s): Ghost of the Seas
- Status: In active service

General characteristics
- Class & type: Ada-class corvette
- Displacement: 2,300 long tons (2,340 t)
- Length: 99.56 m (326.6 ft)
- Beam: 14.40 m (47.2 ft)
- Draft: 3.89 m (12.8 ft)
- Installed power: 31,640 kW (42,430 shp) (CODAG)
- Propulsion: 1 gas turbine, 2 diesels, 2 shafts
- Speed: Economy 15 kn (28 km/h; 17 mph); Maximum 29 kn (54 km/h; 33 mph)
- Range: 3,500 nmi (6,480 km) at 15 knots
- Endurance: 21 days with logistic support; 10 days autonomous
- Complement: 93 including aviation officers, with accommodation for up to 106
- Sensors & processing systems: GENESIS CMS; SMART-S Mk2 search radar; Sonar, GPS, LAN, ECDIS; UniMACS 3000 IPMS; X-band radar, Fire control radar
- Electronic warfare & decoys: Aselsan ARES-2N Others: Laser/RF systems, ASW jammers, SSTD
- Armament: Guns: 1 × 76 mm (3 in) OTO Melara Super Rapid; 2 × 12.7 mm Aselsan STAMP; Anti-surface missiles: 8 × Harpoon; Anti-aircraft missiles: 21 × RAM (PDMS); Torpedoes: 2 × 324 mm Mk.32 triple launchers for Mk.46 torpedoes
- Aviation facilities: Hangar and platform for: S-70B Seahawk ASW helicopters; Unmanned aerial vehicles (UAV)
- Notes: Capability of storing armaments, 20 tons of JP-5 aircraft fuel, aerial refueling (HIRF) and maintenance systems

TCG Heybeliada (F 511) is the lead ship of the Ada-class ASW corvettes of the Turkish Navy. Heybeliada was named after Heybeliada Island, where the Turkish Naval High School is located. Heybeliada Island is part of the Prince Islands archipelago in the Sea of Marmara, to the southeast of Istanbul.

== Design and description ==
Heybeliada has a displacement of 2,300 long tons (2,340 t), is 99.56 m (326.6 ft) in length, 14.4 m (47 ft) in beam, and has a draft of 3.89 m (12.8 ft). She is powered by two diesel engines and a gas turbine, with a power of 31,640 kilowatts (42,430 hp), driving two propellers, and is capable of speeding up to 29 knots (54 km/h; 33 mph). She has a range of 3,500 nautical miles (6,500 km) at 15 knots (28 km/h; 17 mph), and has an endurance of 21 days with logistical support and ten days while operating autonomously. She has a crew of 93, with space for up to 106.

Heybeliada is equipped with GENESIS combat management system that controls search and navigation radars, electronic warfare suits, weapons, countermeasures, communication devices, underwater and onboard sensors. The ship is armed with a single 76-millimetre (3 in) OTO Melara gun, two ASELSAN STAMP 12.7-millimetre (0.50 in) guns, eight Harpoon missiles, 21 Rolling Airframe Missiles and two 324-millimetre (12.8 in) Mark 32 triple launchers for Mark 46 torpedoes. Electronic warfare systems include a dedicated EW radar, laser/RF systems, ASW jammers, and an SSTD system. Communication and navigation systems involve satellite communication, X-band, navigation, fire control and LPI radar, ECDIS, GPS and LAN infrastructure. The radar suite is the SMART-S Mk2, built by Thales. The ship is fitted with sonar developed by the Scientific and Technological Research Council of Turkey. The whole platform is managed by an advanced integrated platform management system.

The ship is capable of carrying Sikorsky S-70 helicopter or unmanned aircraft, along with the associated armaments, 20 tons of JP-5 aircraft fuel, aerial refueling systems and maintenance facilities.

== Construction and career ==
The ship was designed, developed, and built by the Tuzla (Istanbul) Naval Shipyard as a part of the MILGEM project. Istanbul Naval Shipyard Command started construction of Heybeliada on 22 January 2007. The ship was laid down on 22 January 2007 and launched on 27 September 2008. Sailed out for initial sea trials in 2008, she was officially commissioned by the Turkish Navy & entered navy service on 27 September 2011.

Since her commissioning, her longest voyage has been 2013 Mediterranean cruise. This journey took the vessel to the ports of Alexandria, Tripoli, Algiers, La Goulette, Casablanca, and Durrës. Throughout the vagaries of her service career, the vessel has received the moniker the "Ghost of the Seas".
