= PNS Babur (2023) =

Pakistani corvette

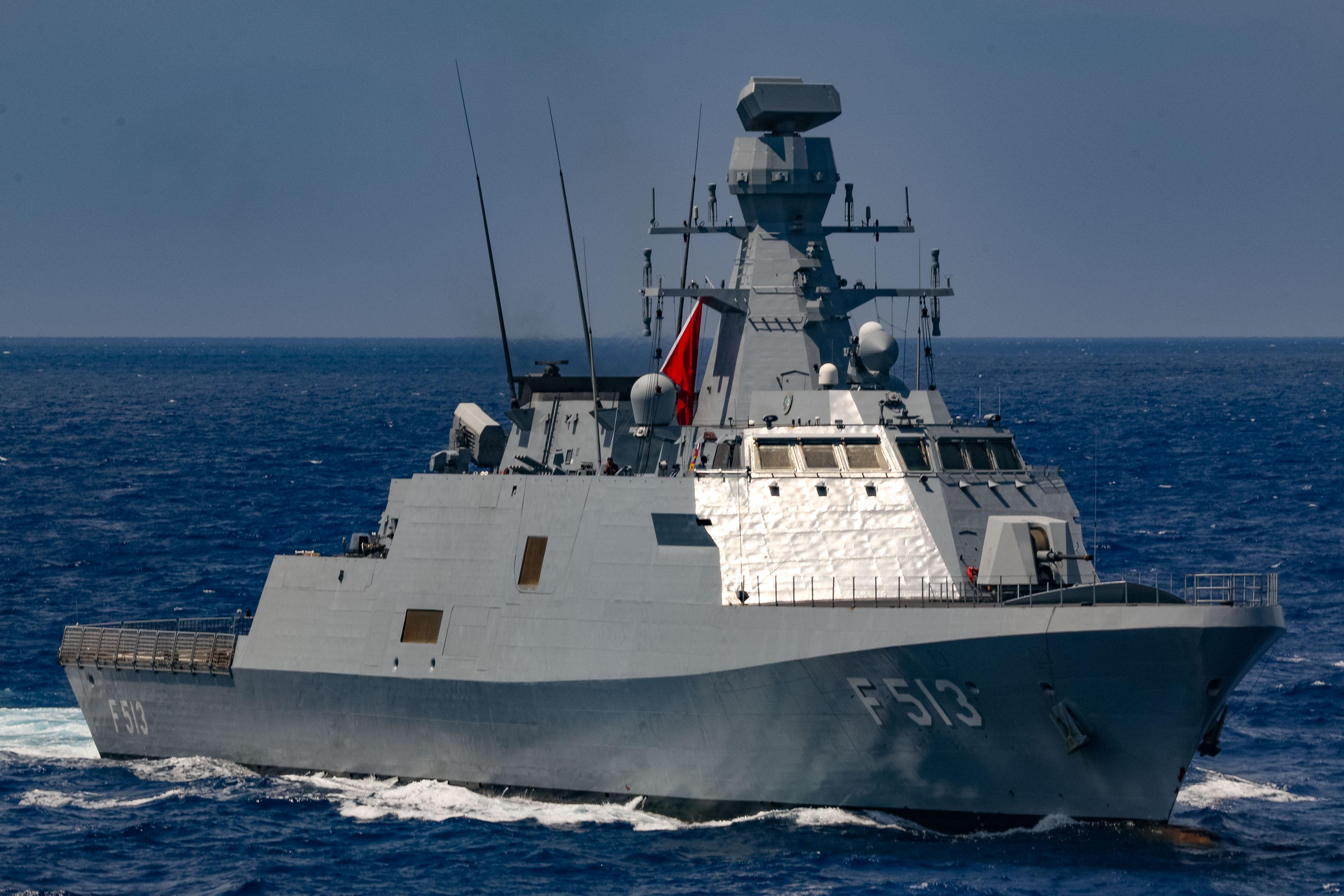
- PNS Babur shares the same baseline design with the Ada-class corvettes.

History

Pakistan
- Name: PNS Babur
- Namesake: Babur
- Status: In active service
- Badge

General characteristics
- Type: Multi-purpose corvette
- Displacement: 2,400 tons
- Length: 99.5 meters
- Beam: 14.4m
- Draft: 3.90 m (12 ft 10 in)
- Installed power: 2 × MTU 16V 595 TE90; 1 × General Electric LM2500
- Propulsion: CODAG
- Speed: 29 knots (54 km/h; 33 mph) (Maximum)
- Range: 3,500 nmi (6,500 km; 4,000 mi)
- Endurance: 15 days
- Sensors & processing systems: Combat Suite :-; HAVELSAN GENESİS ADVENT Combat Management System (CMS); Radar :-; Aselsan SMART-S Mk2 S-Band 3D radar; Aselsan ALPER LPI radar; Aselsan AKREP (AKR-D Block B-1/2) fire-control radar; Northrop Grumman LN-270 INS/GPS navigation system; Sonar :-; Meteksan YAKAMOS hull-mounted sonar; Tracking Systems :-; Aselsan SeaEye-AHTAPOT electro-optical surveillance system; Aselsan PIRI infrared search and track system (IRST); Data Links :-; MilSOFT Naval Information Exchange System (NIXS) C4I; Pakistan-developed "Link Green" tactical data link
- Electronic warfare & decoys: Aselsan ARES-2NC Radar ESM
- Armament: Anti-air warfare :-; 12 × Albatross NG (CAMM-ER) surface-to-air missiles launcher; Anti-surface warfare :-; 2 × triple-cell missile launchers, for 6 P-282 SMASH anti-ship missiles; Anti-submarine warfare :-; 2 × 3-cell Mark 32 324 mm lightweight torpedo tubes; Guns :-; 1 × OTO Melara 76 mm naval gun; 1 × Aselsan GOKDENIZ 35 mm CIWS; 2 × Aselsan STOP 25 mm remote weapon stations; Decoys :-; Aselsan HIZIR torpedo-countermeasure system
- Aviation facilities: Flight deck with enclosed aviation hangar, for 1 anti-submarine helicopter (presumably the AgustaWestland AW159 Wildcat)
- Notes: Pakistan-specific variant of Ada-class corvette

PNS Babur (F2820) is the lead ship of the Babur-class multimission corvettes of the Pakistani Navy. The corvette class is heavier and larger than the Turkish Ada-class corvette from which it has been developed from and is also equipped with Vertical launching systems.

== History ==
The ship was built in Istanbul under the MILGEM project.Babur was laid down on 4 June 2020 and was launched into the water on 15 August 2021. She was delivered to the Pakistan Navy and commissioned into service on 23 September 2023

== See also ==
- PNS Babur
