= Atılay-class submarine =

Atılay-class submarine may refer to:

- Atılay-class submarine (1974), the first group of Type 209 submarines in service with the Turkish Navy
- Atılay-class submarine (2025), a class of air-independent propulsion submarines under construction for the Turkish Navy, with the first ship laid down in 2025
