= TCG Kınalıada =

Ship in the Turkish Navy

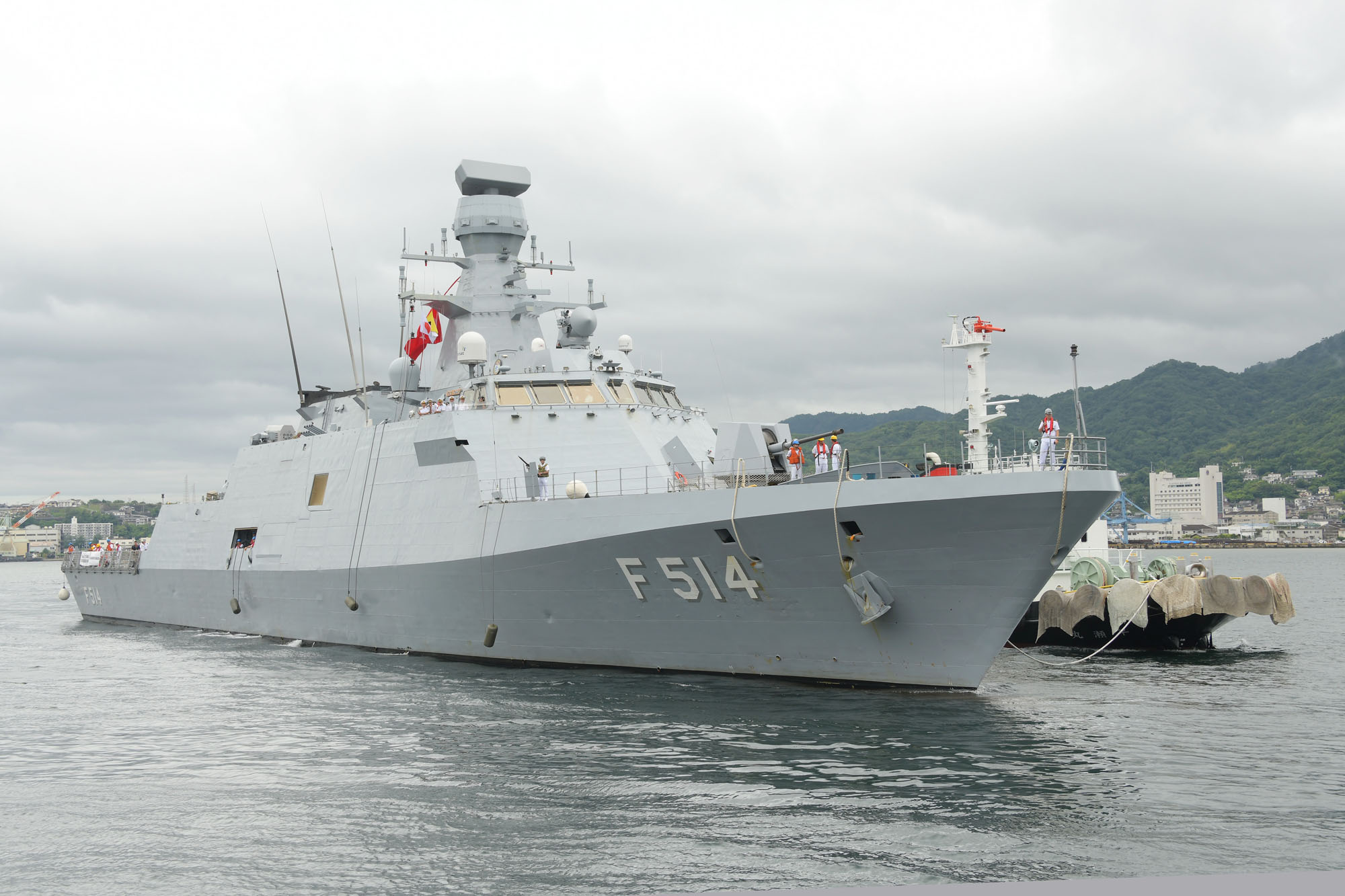
- TCG Kınalıada arriving at the JMSDF Kure Naval Base, 18 June 2024

History

Turkey
- Name: Kınalıada
- Namesake: Kınalıada
- Laid down: October 8, 2015
- Launched: July 3, 2017
- Commissioned: September 29, 2019
- Identification: F-514
- Status: In active service

General characteristics
- Class & type: Ada-class corvette
- Displacement: 2,400 long tons (2,440 t)
- Length: 99.50 m (326.4 ft)
- Beam: 14.40 m (47.2 ft)
- Draft: 3.89 m (12.8 ft)
- Installed power: 35,000 kW (47,000 shp) (CODAG)
- Propulsion: 1 gas turbine, 2 diesels, 2 shafts
- Speed: Economy 15 kn (28 km/h; 17 mph); Maximum 29 kn (54 km/h; 33 mph)
- Range: 3,500 nmi (6,480 km) at 15 knots
- Endurance: 21 days with logistic support; 10 days autonomous
- Complement: 93 including aviation officers, with accommodation for up to 106
- Sensors & processing systems: ADVENT CMS; SMART-S Mk2 search radar; Sonar, GPS, LAN, ECDIS; UniMACS 3000 IPMS; X-band radar, Fire control radar
- Electronic warfare & decoys: Aselsan ARES-2N Others: Laser/RF systems, ASW jammers, SSTD
- Armament: Guns: 1 × 76 mm (3 in) OTO Melara Super Rapid; 2 × 12.7 mm Aselsan STAMP; Anti-surface missiles: 8 × Atmaca; Anti-aircraft missiles: 21 × RAM (PDMS); Torpedoes: 2 × 324 mm Mk.32 triple launchers for Mk.46 torpedoes
- Aviation facilities: Hangar and platform for: S-70B Seahawk ASW helicopters; Unmanned aerial vehicles (UAV)
- Notes: Capability of storing armaments, 20 tons of JP-5 aircraft fuel, aerial refueling (HIRF) and maintenance systems

TCG Kınalıada (F-514) is the fourth ship of the Ada-class ASW corvettes of the Turkish Navy. Kınalıada was named after Kınalıada Island, which is a part of the Princes' Islands archipelago in the Sea of Marmara, to the southeast of Istanbul, Turkey.

Designed, developed, and built by the Tuzla (Istanbul) Naval Shipyard as a part of the MILGEM project, she was laid down on October 8, 2015.

== History ==
Istanbul Naval Shipyard Command started construction of Kınalıada on October 8, 2015, and the first-welding ceremony took place on June 18, 2016. She was launched on July 3, 2017 and commissioned on September 29, 2019 after having completed sea trials. Her name Kınalıada means “Henna Island” in Turkish.

== Description ==
Kınalıada has a displacement of 2,400 long tons (2,440 t), is 99.50 m (326.4 ft) in length, 14.4 m (47 ft) in beam, and has a draft of 3.89 m (12.8 ft). She is powered by two diesel engines and a gas turbine, with a power of 35,000 kilowatts (47,000 hp), driving two propellers, and is capable of speeding up to 29 knots (54 km/h; 33 mph). She has a range of 3,500 nautical miles (6,500 km) at 15 knots (28 km/h; 17 mph), and has an endurance of 21 days with logistical support and ten days while operating autonomously. She has a crew of 93, with space for up to 106.

Kınalıada is equipped with GENESIS combat management system that controls search and navigation radars, electronic warfare suits, weapons, countermeasures, communication devices, underwater and onboard sensors.< The ship is armed with a single 76-millimetre (3 in) OTO Melara gun, two ASELSAN STAMP 12.7-millimetre (0.50 in) guns, eight Harpoon missiles, 21 Rolling Airframe Missiles and two 324-millimetre (12.8 in) Mark 32 triple launchers for Mark 46 torpedoes. Electronic warfare systems include a dedicated EW radar, laser/RF systems, ASW jammers, and an SSTD system. Communication and navigation systems involve satellite communication, X-band, navigation, fire control and LPI radar, ECDIS, GPS and LAN infrastructure. The radar suite is the SMART-S Mk2, built by Thales. The ship is fitted with sonar developed by the Scientific and Technological Research Council of Turkey.The whole platform is managed by an advanced integrated platform management system.

The ship is capable of carrying Sikorsky S-70 helicopter or unmanned aircraft, along with the associated armaments, 20 tons of JP-5 aircraft fuel, aerial refueling systems and maintenance facilities.
