= Hetman Ivan Mazepa =

Hetman Ivan Mazepa may refer to:

- Ivan Mazepa, 1639–1709, a Ukrainian military, political, and civic leader
- Ukrainian corvette Hetman Ivan Mazepa, an anti-submarine corvette of the Ukrainian Navy
