= MILGEM project =

National warship program of Turkey

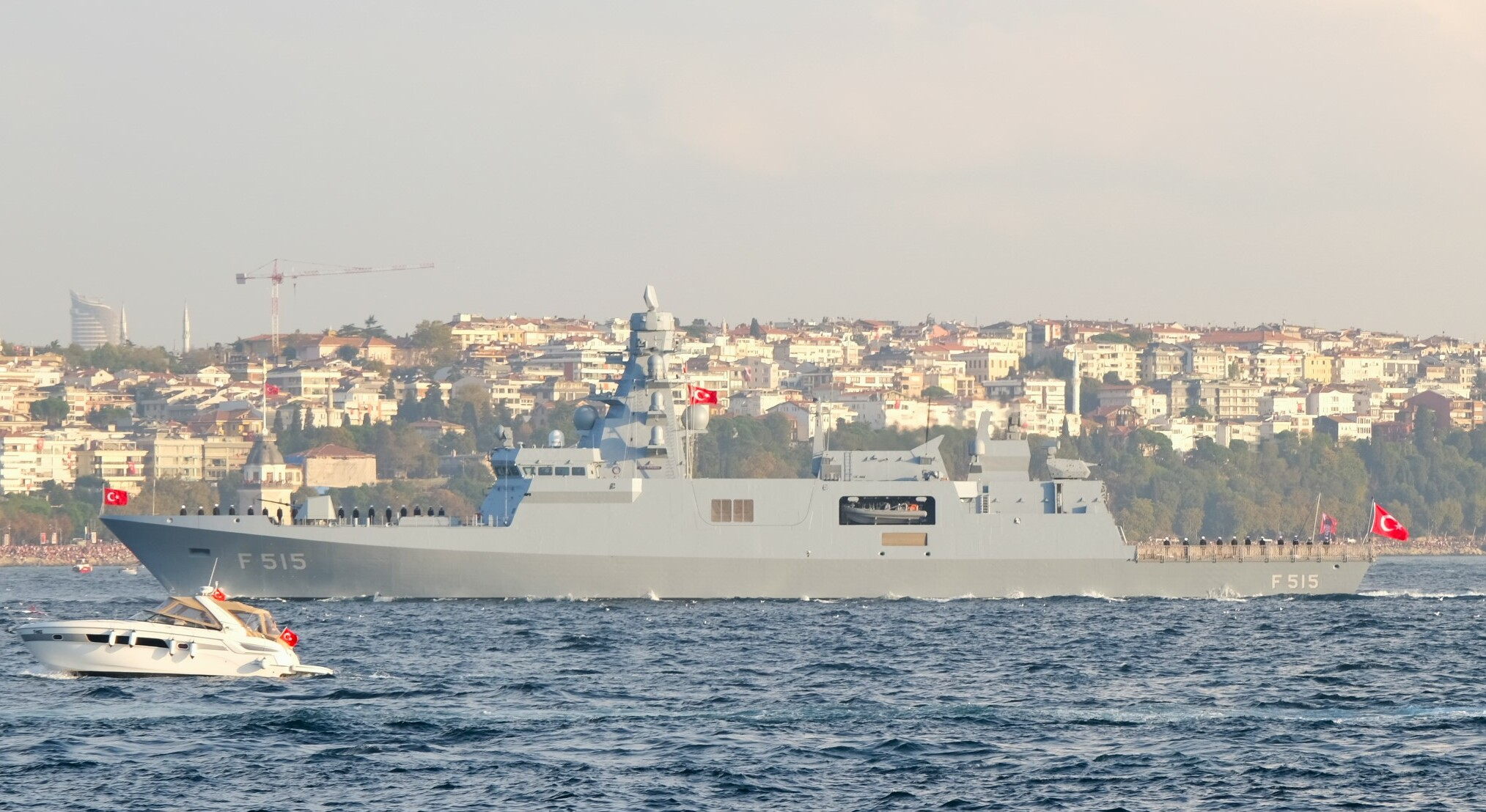
TCG Istanbul (F-515), the lead ship of the Istanbul-class frigates, at the Bosporus strait, October 29, 2023.

The MILGEM project (Turkish: Milli Gemi Projesi; English: National Ship Project) is a national warship program of the Republic of Turkey. Managed by the Turkish Navy, the project aims at developing multipurpose corvettes, frigates and destroyers that can be deployed in a range of missions, including reconnaissance, surveillance, early warning, anti-submarine warfare, surface-to-surface and surface-to-air warfare, and amphibious operations.

As of 2023, the MILGEM project covers four Ada class anti-submarine warfare corvettes, one ELINT corvette, eight Istanbul-class multipurpose frigates, 10 Hisar class OPVs as well as eight TF2000-class anti-air warfare destroyers destined for the Turkish Navy; four Babur-class corvettes for the Pakistan Navy; and two Ada class corvettes for the Ukrainian Navy.

The name of the project is derived from the phrase "National Ship" in Turkish – Milli Gemi.

== History ==
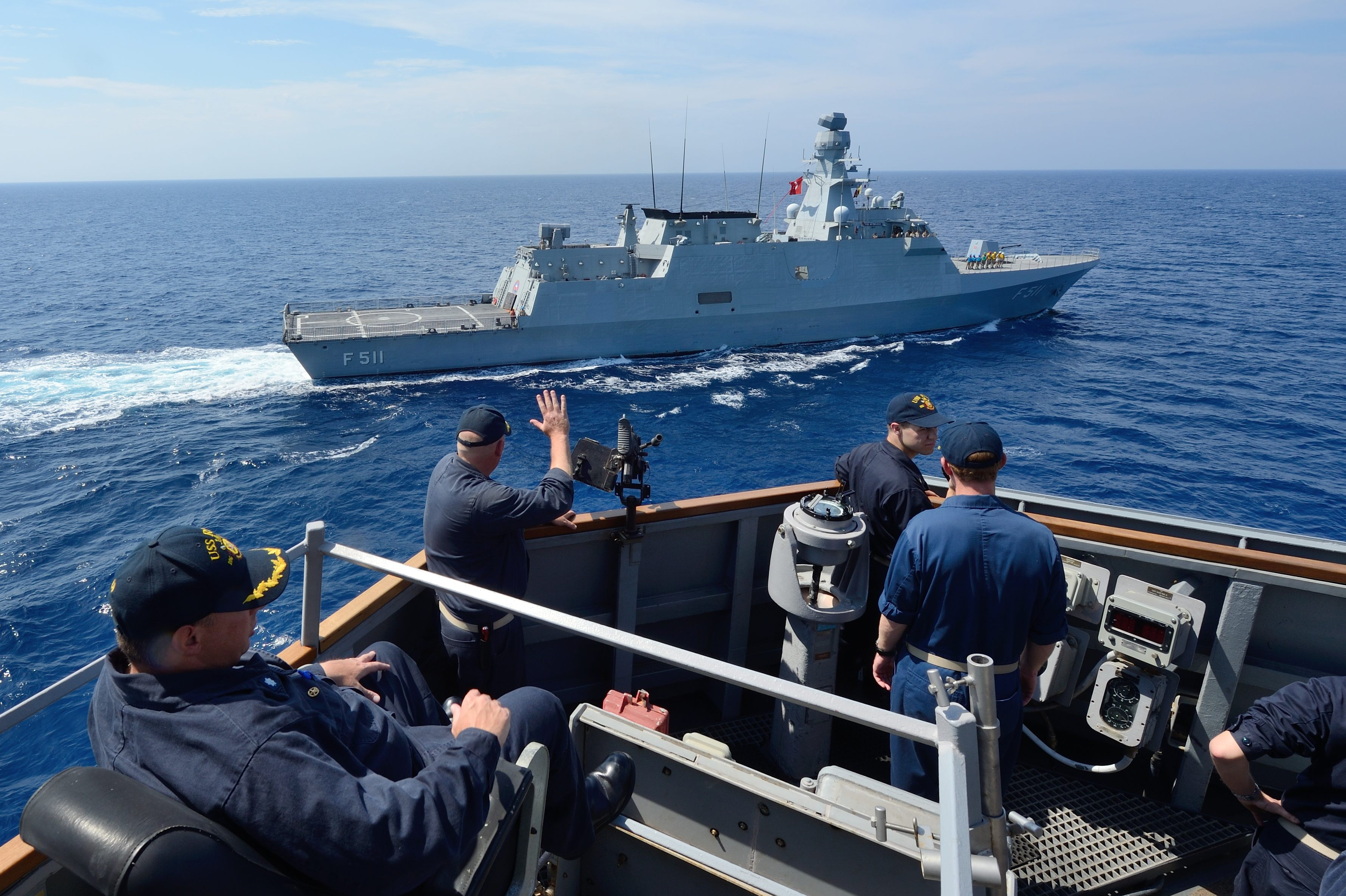
TCG Heybeliada (F-511), the lead ship of the Ada-class corvettes, in the Mediterranean Sea, September 2, 2014.

In mid 1990s the Turkish Navy was researching national resources to design, develop and construct a completely indigenous corvette. In 2004, Istanbul Naval Shipyard Command established MILGEM Project Office to execute and coordinate the design, engineering and construction projects.

By developing the MILGEM project, Turkey aimed to build a warship using local resources to the maximum extent possible, improve national military shipbuilding capacity and skills. The objectives for the Ada class were set to enhance the littoral warfare capabilities and to meet the operational requirements of the Turkish Navy. MILGEM project office focused on building a modern littoral combat ship with authentic anti-submarine warfare and high-seas patrol capability, extensively employing low-observable superstructure and intelligence sensors. In 2005, Istanbul Naval Shipyard Command commenced the construction works of the first vessel of MILGEM project, TCG Heybeliada.

In 2014, Turkish defense technology and engineering company STM was selected as a subprime contractor for the construction of remaining Ada-class vessels. More than 50 local suppliers, including Turkish defense companies like ASELSAN and HAVELSAN played significant role in developing local subcomponents for command-and-control and electronic battle management system

== Characteristics ==
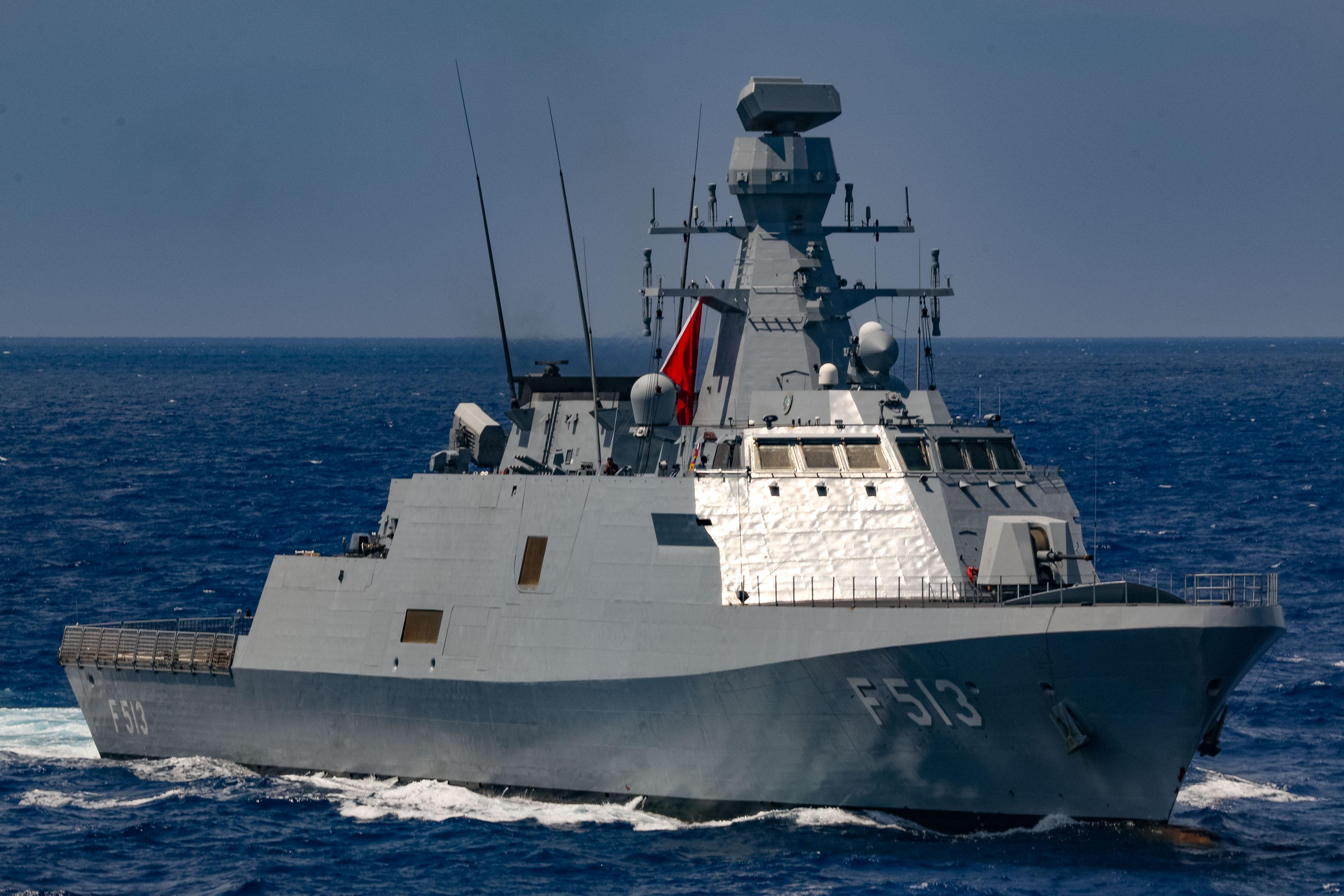
TCG Burgazada during a Turkish-American naval exercise in the Mediterranean Sea, August 26, 2020

The ships are propelled by a RENK CODAG Cross Connect propulsion plant. It consists of a gas turbine rated at 23,000 kilowatts (31,000 hp) and two diesel engines rated at 4,320 kW (5,790 hp). Each diesel engine drives one controllable pitch propeller via a two speed main reduction gear. The cross connect gear splits the power from the gas turbine via both main reduction gears to the two shafts. The ship can be operated in diesel mode, in single gas turbine mode or in CODAG mode where diesel and gas turbine are providing a combined power of 27,640 kW (37,070 hp).

GENESIS (Gemi Entegre Savaş İdare Sistemi, i.e. Ship Integrated Combat Management System), a network-centric combat management system developed by HAVELSAN and originally used in the upgraded G-class frigates of the Turkish Navy, was contracted for the first two Ada-class corvettes on May 23, 2007. The MILGEM ships have a national hull mounted sonar developed by the Scientific and Technological Research Council of Turkey. Sonar dome has been developed by STM's subcontractor ONUK-BG Defence Systems, extensively employing nano-enhanced fiber reinforced polymer. The Ada class features an electronic chart precise integrated navigation system (ECPINS) supplied by OSI Geospatial. Integrated Platform Management System (IPMS), delivered by STM's subcontractor Yaltes JV, monitors and controls machinery, auxiliary systems, electrical power generation and distribution. The main systems integrated in IPMS include a power management system, fire detection system, fire fighting and damage control system, CCTV system and stability control system.

== Ships ==
=== Hisar-class offshore patrol vessel ===
Under the Offshore Patrol Vessel Project, initiated to meet the needs of the Turkish Naval Forces, the construction of ten offshore patrol vessels (OPVs) is planned. The first ship is scheduled to be launched in 2023. Developed as a variant of the MİLGEM-class corvettes, the Hisar class patrol ships has been redesigned with a different main propulsion system and a different structural and general layout concept, allowing it to be built in a shorter time and at a lower cost.

The primary missions of the OPVs to be built are intelligence, surveillance, and reconnaissance (ISR), search and rescue (SAR), counterterrorism, maritime interdiction operations (MIO), and maritime special operations. Other missions include naval air operations, electronic and acoustic warfare, land bombardment, defense against asymmetric threats, maritime traffic protection, and support and training for amphibious operations.

The Hisar-class patrol ships is being built using the "fitted for but not with" concept, which allows for the integration of newly developed indigenous weapon and sensor systems. The OPV, which can accommodate a total of 104 people, will have a range of 4,500 nautical miles (8,300 km; 5,200 mi) with its CODELOD (COmbined Diesel-eLectric Or Diesel) main propulsion system.

=== Ada-class corvette ===
The Ada class is a class of anti-submarine corvettes developed primarily for the Turkish Navy during the first stage of the MILGEM project. The Turkish Navy has commissioned all four Ada-class corvettes. The design objective of the Ada class was to build a modern littoral combat ship, with national anti-submarine warfare (ASW) and high-seas patrol capabilities, while extensively using the principles of low observable technology in its design.

=== Istanbul-class frigate ===
The Istanbul-class Frigate Program was launched to construct eight frigates to replace aging Yavuz-class frigates in the mid-2020s. Developed under the MILGEM indigenous warship program, the Istanbul class is an enlarged variant of the Ada-class anti-submarine corvette. The Istanbul-class frigates will have around 50% increased fuel capacity and operational/sailing range capability compared to Ada-class corvettes.

The Istanbul-class frigates have the configuration to conduct detection, determination of position, classification, identification, and destruction of the target and NGFS. The frigates are designed to conduct maritime surveillance and patrol operations, inspection, and surveillance of exclusive economic zone besides preventing potential threats.

=== TF-2000-class destroyer ===
The planned eight multi-mission TF2000-class destroyers are able to conduct anti-aircraft warfare (AAW) with SİPER and Sapan surface-to-air missiles; tactical land strikes with Gezgin cruise missiles; ASW with towed array sonar, anti-submarine rockets, and ASW helicopters; and anti-surface warfare (ASuW) with Atmaca missiles.

== Export ==
According to a CNN Türk news report on September 27, 2008, the navies of Canada, Pakistan, Bangladesh, Ukraine and a number of South American countries have expressed interest in acquiring MILGEM project warships. According to Bloomberg, Turkey is offering a $6 billion defense deal with Saudi Arabia which includes MILGEMs.

=== Pakistan ===
The Babur-class corvette, also known as the PN MILGEM class, is a class of four heavy corvettes under construction for the Pakistan Navy. This class is a subclass of the Turkish MILGEM project. The corvette class is heavier and larger than the Turkish Ada-class corvette and are also equipped with a vertical launch system.

On 5 July 2018, Pakistani military's ISPR announced that a Turkish firm has won the tender to build four MILGEM corvettes for the Pakistan Navy. Turkish defence minister, Nurettin Canikli, described the deal as “the largest defense export of Turkey in one agreement.”

By September 2018, some details have emerged that corvettes for Pakistan Navy will have CODAD propulsion system instead of CODAG, thus increasing the sea endurance from 10 to 15 days. Further, the first vessel is planned to be constructed in 54 months and the remaining vessels will be constructed in 60, 66 and 72 months, respectively.

The Babur-class corvettes will be one of the most technologically advanced surface platforms of the Pakistan Navy fleet. Keel Laying ceremony of third PN MILGEM-class warship was held. The warship will complete in 2024.

Coinciding with the commissioning ceremony of TCG Kınalıada attended by Turkish president Recep Tayyip Erdoğan, steel cutting ceremony for the first MILGEM ship for the Pakistan Navy was also held there on 29 September 2019. The first Pakistani vessel named PNS Babur was launched on 15 August 2021.

=== Romania ===
In 2025, Romanian Navy made a deal to acquire the Hisar-class corvette TCG Akhisar (renamed Contraamiral Roman) for €223 million.

=== Ukraine ===
In December 2020, the Ukrainian Navy signed a deal with Turkey's Presidency of Defense Industries for the production of Ada-class corvettes in the Okean shipyard at Mykolaiv, Ukraine. In August 2022, the name of the first ship was announced as Hetman Ivan Mazepa after Hetman Ivan Mazepa.

== See also ==
- MILDEN project
- Reis-class submarine
- MUGEM-class aircraft carrier
- ASFAT
- List of naval ship classes in service
