= Jinnah-class frigate =

Class of multi-role warships for the Pakistan Navy

Class overview
- Name: Jinnah-class frigate
- Builders: Platform Design Wing (designer) Karachi Shipyard & Engineering Works (KSEW)
- Operators: Pakistan Navy
- Planned: 6–8
- Building: 1

General characteristics
- Type: Multi-role frigate
- Displacement: 3,300 tons
- Length: 119.5 m (392 ft 1 in)
- Beam: 15.40 m (50 ft 6 in)
- Draft: 4.05 m (13 ft 3 in)
- Propulsion: Combined Diesel and Diesel (CODAD) propulsion
- Speed: 26 knots (48 km/h; 30 mph)
- Aviation facilities: 1 × helicopter landing deck

The Jinnah-class frigate is a class of multi-role frigates under construction for the Pakistan Navy. The Jinnah class is Pakistan's first indigenously designed and built frigate. A contract for the construction of the frigates was signed on 3 November 2025 with the Karachi Shipyard & Engineering Works (KSEW), with the first warships expected to join the navy's fleet by 2028. The Jinnah class is named after the founder of Pakistan, Muhammad Ali Jinnah.

== Design ==
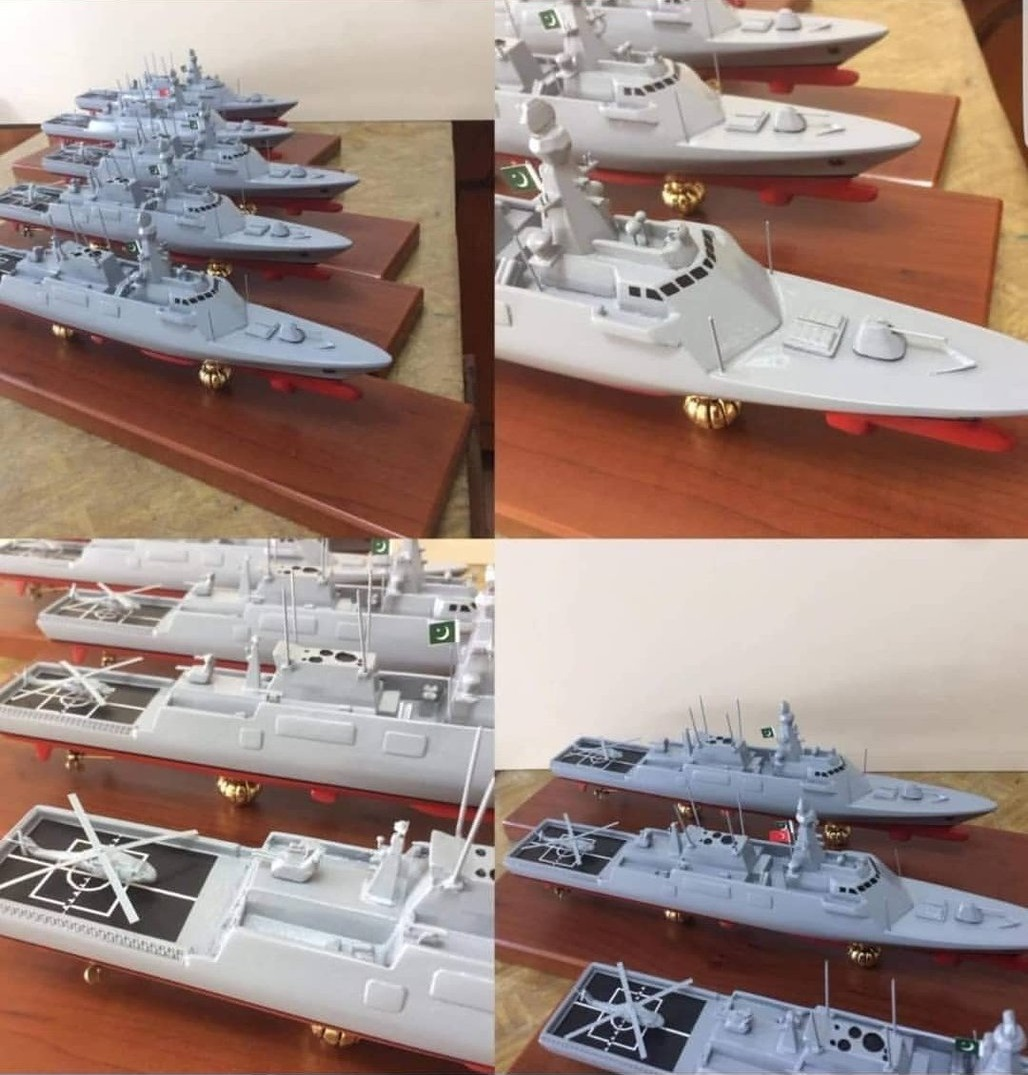
Early stage design of the Jinnah class frigate.

The Jinnah class was designed by the Pakistan Navy's Platform Design Wing. It measures 119 meters (390 ft 5 in) in length with a 15-meter (49 ft) beam and has a displacement of about 3,300 tons. It will be powered by four diesel engines. The frigate will carry out anti-submarine, anti-surface and anti-air operations and will be fitted with a hull-mounted sonar system and equipped with a helicopter landing deck.

=== Armament ===
The armament will include a 30 mm gun, missiles, additional weapons, torpedoes, sensors, and anti-submarine rockets.

== See also ==
- Babur-class corvette
- Zulfiquar-class frigate
- Tughril-class frigate
