= Istanbul Naval Shipyard =

Naval shipyard of the Turkish Navy

Coordinates: 40°51′44.85″N 29°15′47.89″E

Istanbul Naval Shipyard (Turkish: İstanbul Donanma Tersanesi), also known as Pendik Naval Shipyard, is a naval shipyard of the Turkish Navy on the northeastern coast of the Sea of Marmara in Pendik, Istanbul, Turkey. It is the largest shipbuilding facility in Turkey.

Right after the 1999 İzmit earthquake, which also caused heavy damage to the facilities of the Turkish Navy located in Gölcük, Kocaeli, the Navy Command decided to relocate the shipbuilding activities at the Gölcük Naval Shipyard to the Istanbul Naval Shipyard, leaving only the ship maintenance and reparation works there.

The shipyard has one of the largest shipbuilding dry-docks in the country, with the dimensions of 300 m × 50 m × 8.5 m (984 ft × 164 ft × 28 ft) (length x width x depth). The dry-dock is serviced by one Kone portal crane with the lifting capacity of 450 tons.

In addition, the shipyard has a semi-dry-dock slipway with the dimensions of 200 m × 38 m (656 ft × 125 ft) (length by width), serviced by one portal crane with the lifting capacity of 300 tons.

== Ships built ==
- RV Bilim-2, scientific research vessel

Turkish Navy

- TCG Burgazada, Ada-class corvette
- TCG Büyükada, Ada-class corvette
- TCG Heybeliada, Ada-class corvette
- TCG Istanbul (F-515), Istanbul-class frigate
- TCG Kınalıada, Ada-class corvette

Pakistan Navy

- PNS Babur (F-280), Babur-class heavy corvette

== See also ==
- Anadolu Shipyard
- Sedef Shipyard
