= Atılay-class submarine (2025) =

National submarine program of Turkey

Class overview
- Name: Atılay class
- Builders: Gölcük Naval Shipyard
- Operators: Turkish Navy
- Preceded by: Reis class
- Planned: 6
- Building: 1

General characteristics
- Displacement: 2,700 t (2,700 long tons) (surfaced)
- Length: 80 m (262 ft 6 in)
- Crew: ~40–50
- Armament: Torpedo tubes: 8 x 533 mm torpedo tubes: Torpedoes: Roketsan Akya; Missiles: Atmaca anti-ship missile; Gezgin land-attack cruise missiles (planned); Potential SLBM; Potential VLS (suggested in design models)

The Atılay class (Turkish: Atılay sınıfı), developed under the project name MİLDEN (Turkish: Milli Denizaltı, lit. 'National Submarine'), is a class of air-independent propulsion (AIP) attack submarines currently under construction for the Turkish Naval Forces.

The project represents Turkey's first indigenous submarine design and development program, intended to reduce reliance on foreign suppliers for critical naval platforms. The lead boat of the class, Atılay, began construction at the Gölcük Naval Shipyard in late 2025.

The Turkish Navy plans to acquire 6 MİLDEN-class submarines.

== Development ==
The MİLDEN project was initiated to achieve strategic autonomy in submarine technology, following the experience gained by the Turkish defense industry through the licensed production of the Reis-class (Type 214TN) submarines. The project is managed by the Turkish Ministry of National Defense and the Presidency of Defense Industries (SSB), with primary design and construction executed by Gölcük Naval Shipyard and engineering support from STM.

The concept design phase was completed in 2022, after which the project moved into the detailed design phase. The design process involved extensive contributions from Turkish defense contractors, including Aselsan (avionics and sensors), Roketsan (weaponry), and Havelsan (combat management systems).

Construction of the first test block for the lead submarine commenced in late 2024, with the official hull-laying and naming ceremony taking place in December 2025. The class was named Atılay in honor of TCG Atılay, the leading vessel of the first class of submarines that were assembled at the shipyards of the Republic of Turkey in the 1930s (though the first submarine that was assembled at a shipyard in Turkey was the Ottoman submarine Abdül Hamid of 1886).

== Design ==
The Atılay class is significantly larger than the preceding Reis class (Type 214), with a displacement of approximately 2,700 tons surfaced and a length exceeding 80 meters (260 ft).

=== Propulsion ===
The submarines utilize a diesel-electric propulsion system augmented by an Air-independent propulsion (AIP) system. This system allows the submarine to operate submerged for extended periods without snorkeling, significantly reducing its acoustic signature and vulnerability to detection. The indigenous AIP solution is reported to utilize proton-exchange membrane fuel cell (PEM) technology, potentially integrated with a methanol reformer system and Lithium-ion batteries.

=== Systems and Sensors ===
The Atılay class features a fully indigenous sensor suite and command infrastructure:

- Combat Management System (CMS): The vessels are equipped with a national CMS, likely an evolution of the MÜREN or GENESIS/ADVENT systems adapted for underwater warfare.
- Sonar: Developed by Aselsan, the suite includes a bow sonar, flank array sonar, and a towed array sonar for long-range passive detection.
- Optronics: A non-penetrating optronic mast replaces the traditional optical periscope.

=== Armament ===
The class is designed with heavy firepower capabilities, exceeding those of previous Turkish Navy submarines.

- Torpedoes: Eight 533 mm torpedo tubes capable of launching the indigenous Roketsan Akya heavyweight torpedo.
- Missiles: The submarines can fire the Atmaca anti-ship missile (submarine-launched variant).
- Land Attack: Future integration of the Gezgin cruise missile is planned to provide deep-strike strategic deterrence.
- Vertical Launch System (VLS): Design models and defense exhibitions have suggested the inclusion of a MiDLAS vertical launching system module for launching cruise missiles, though the final configuration of the first hull is subject to confirmation.
- SLBM:Potentially SLBM version of Tayfun.

== Ships in class ==
The first ship of the class was named Atılay in December 2025.

Name	Hull number	Builder	Laid down	Launched	Commissioned	Status
TCG Atılay	—	Gölcük Naval Shipyard	2025	—	Planned 2030s	Under construction
Unnamed	—	—	—	—	Planned 2030s	Planned
Unnamed	—	—	—	—	Planned 2030s	Planned
Unnamed	—	—	—	—	Planned 2030s	Planned
Unnamed	—	—	—	—	Planned 2030s	Planned
Unnamed	—	—	—	—	Planned 2030s	Planned

== See also ==
- List of submarine classes in service

Equivalent submarines of the same era

- Type 212CD
- Project-75
- Dakar class
- Jang Yeongsil class
