= Babur-class corvette =

Class of multi-role warships for the Pakistan Navy

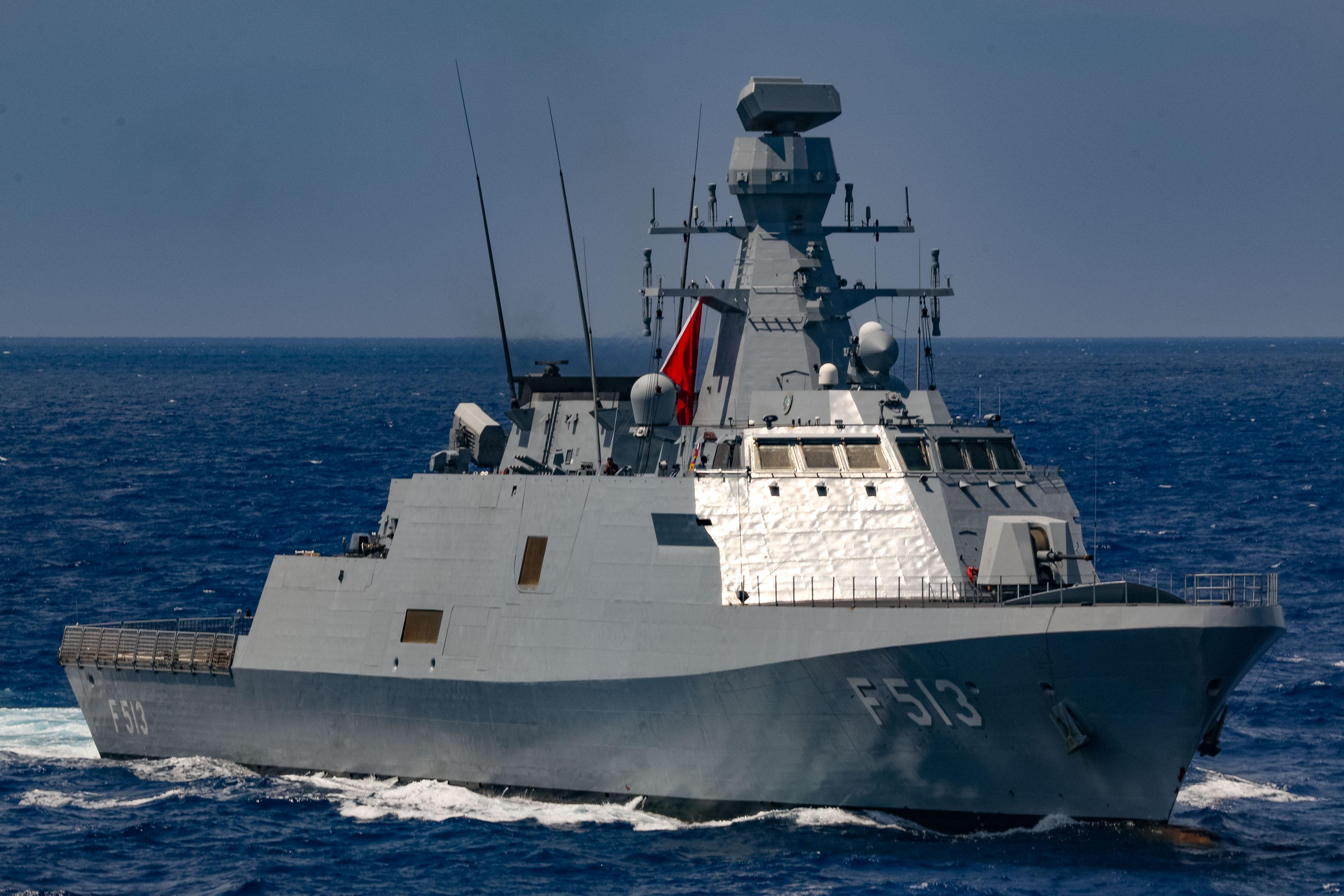
- Babur class shares the same baseline design with the Ada-class corvettes.

Class overview
- Name: Babur class
- Builders: Istanbul Naval Shipyard (INSY); Karachi Shipyard & Engineering Works (KSEW)
- Operators: Pakistan Navy
- Built: 2019–present
- Planned: 4
- Completed: 4
- Active: 2

General characteristics
- Type: Multi-purpose corvette
- Displacement: 3,000 tons
- Length: 108.8m
- Beam: 14.8m
- Draught: 4.05 m (13 ft 3 in)
- Installed power: 2 × MTU 16V 595 TE90; 1 × General Electric LM2500
- Propulsion: CODAG
- Speed: 27–31 knots (50–57 km/h; 31–36 mph) (Maximum)
- Range: 3,500 nmi (6,500 km; 4,000 mi)
- Endurance: 15 days
- Sensors & processing systems: Combat Suite :-; HAVELSAN GENESİS ADVENT Combat Management System (CMS); Radar :-; Aselsan SMART-S Mk2 S-Band 3D radar; Aselsan ALPER LPI radar; Aselsan AKREP (AKR-D Block B-1/2) fire-control radar; Northrop Grumman LN-270 INS/GPS navigation system; Sonar :-; Meteksan YAKAMOS hull-mounted sonar; Tracking Systems :-; Aselsan SeaEye-AHTAPOT electro-optical surveillance system; Aselsan PIRI infrared search and track system (IRST); Data Links :-; MilSOFT Naval Information Exchange System (NIXS) C4I; Pakistan-developed "Link Green" tactical data link
- Electronic warfare & decoys: Aselsan ARES-2NC Radar ESM
- Armament: Anti-air warfare :-; 12 × Albatross NG (CAMM-ER) surface-to-air missiles launcher; Anti-surface warfare :-; 2 × triple-cell missile launchers, for 6 P282 SMASH anti-ship missiles; Anti-submarine warfare :-; 2 × 3-cell Mark 32 324 mm lightweight torpedo tubes; Guns :-; 1 × OTO Melara 76 mm naval gun; 1 × Aselsan GOKDENIZ 35 mm CIWS; 2 × Aselsan STOP 25 mm remote weapon stations; Decoys :-; Aselsan HIZIR torpedo-countermeasure system
- Aviation facilities: Flight deck with enclosed aviation hangar, for 1 anti-submarine helicopter (presumably the AgustaWestland AW159 Wildcat)
- Notes: Pakistan-specific variant of Ada-class corvette

The Babur-class corvette, also known as the PN MILGEM class, is a class of four heavy corvettes in the Pakistan Navy. This class is a subclass of the Turkish MILGEM project. The corvette class is heavier and larger than the Turkish Ada-class corvette and are also equipped with VLS.

== Equipment ==
=== Armament ===
For its anti-surface warfare (ASuW) capabilities, the corvettes feature two triple-cell launchers for six anti-ship missiles of an undisclosed designation. However, although the missiles-in-question are yet to divulged, it is believed that they may actually be the Harbah anti-ship cruise missiles (ASCM), currently in service with the Pakistan Navy. The Harbah is an anti-ship variant of the Babur subsonic cruise missile, featuring an approximate range of 450–700 km (280–430 mi).

As for its anti-air warfare (AAW) capabilities, the corvettes feature a 12-cell GWS-26 vertical launching system (VLS) configuration.

Initially, the corvettes were selected to feature the Chinese-origin HHQ-16 surface-to-air missiles, developed by the China Aerospace Science and Technology Corp (CASC). However, in 2021 - the Pakistan Navy revealed that it had selected the Albatros NG surface-to-air missiles developed by MBDA, instead. Notably, the Albatros NG - a variant of the CAMM-ER naval anti-air missile - has an approximate range of over 40 km (25 mi), with the capability to neutralize various aerial threats - including anti-ship missiles, unmanned aerial vehicles, and precision-guided munitions. The PN MILGEM corvettes are the first surface warships to utilize Albatros NG.

As for its anti-submarine warfare (ASW) capabilities, the corvettes feature two three-cell Mark 32 324 mm lightweight torpedo tubes, along with an anti-submarine helicopter. Although the helicopter's designation is yet to divulged, it is believed that the corvettes may carry the AgustaWestland AW159 Wildcat.

Additionally, the corvettes have one OTO Melara 76 mm naval gun, one 35 mm Aselsan GOKDENIZ (a close-in weapon system), and two 25mm Aselsan STOP remote weapon stations - for providing short-range point defense against both aerial and surface threats.

=== Sensors ===
In a parallel fashion to the Ada-class corvettes, the Babur class feature similar radar equipment, including :-

The PN MILGEM class is equipped with the SMART-S Mk2 passive electronically scanned array (PESA) radar, license manufactured by Aselsan. The SMART-S Mk2 is a three-dimensional, multi-beam, long-range surface/aerial surveillance radar, featuring an azimuth of 360^{o}, with the capability to track both aerial and surface targets - at ranges of approximately 250 km (160 mi) and 80 km (50 mi), respectively.

The class also features the Aselsan ALPER low-probability-of-intercept radar (LPI) - for detecting and tracking both aerial and surface targets. The ALPER features an approximate range of 36 nmi (67 km).

In addition to the SMART-S Mk2 and the ALPER, the corvettes are also equipped with the AKREP (AKR-D Block B-1/2) fire-control radar (FCR) - capable of tracking and providing target information over an approximate range of 120 km (75 mi).

The corvettes feature the Meteksan YAKAMOS sonar system, as its primary sonar suite. The YAKAMOS is a hull-mounted, medium-frequency anti-submarine/obstacle-avoidance sonar, capable of detecting sub-surface targets within an azimuth of 360^{o} azimuth over a range of 230 km (140 mi).

As part of its electronic warfare (EW) capabilities, the corvettes feature the Aselsan ARES-2N radar ESM system, along with ELINT and SIGINT modules. The ARES-2N is a long-range electronic support system, capable of detecting, intercepting, classifying, tracking and recording electromagnetic emissions of various targets, over an operating frequency of 2-18 GHz.

As part of its tracking capabilities, the PN MILGEM class features the Aselsan SeaEye-AHTAPOT electro-optical surveillance system (EO) - capable of tracking targets at a range of 250 km (160 mi) and the Aselsan PIRI infrared search and track (IRST) system - capable of tracking 150 targets simultaneously, over an azimuth of 360^{o}.

In addition, the class is also equipped with the Northrop Grumman LN-270 INS/GPS navigation system, for providing geopositioning and turret stabilization.

== Ships of the class ==
Pennant number	Name	Builder	Laid down	Launched	Commissioned	Status
F280	Babur	Istanbul Naval Shipyard (INSY)	4 June 2020	15 August 2021	23 September 2023	Active
F282	Khaibar	Istanbul Naval Shipyard (INSY)	1 May 2021	25 November 2022	21 December 2025	Active
F281	Badr	Karachi Shipyard & Engineering Works (KSEW)	25 October 2020	20 May 2022	June 2026 (expected)	Launched
F283	Tariq	Karachi Shipyard & Engineering Works (KSEW)	5 November 2021	2 August 2023	Q1 2027 (expected)	Launched

== See also ==
- Doha-class corvette - A class of multi-mission corvettes currently being built for the Qatari Emiri Navy.
- Kamorta-class corvette - A class of anti-submarine corvettes operated by the Indian Navy.
- Khareef-class corvette - A class of anti-surface corvettes operated by the Royal Navy of Oman.
- Diponegoro-class corvette - A class of guided-missile corvettes operated by the Indonesian Navy.
- Gowind 2500 corvette - A class of multi-mission corvettes currently being built for the Egyptian Navy.
- Steregushchiy-class corvette - A class of multi-purpose corvettes operated by the Russian Navy.
- List of active Pakistan Navy ships
