= Aselsan Gökdeniz =

Turkish anti-aircraft gun

GOKDENIZ
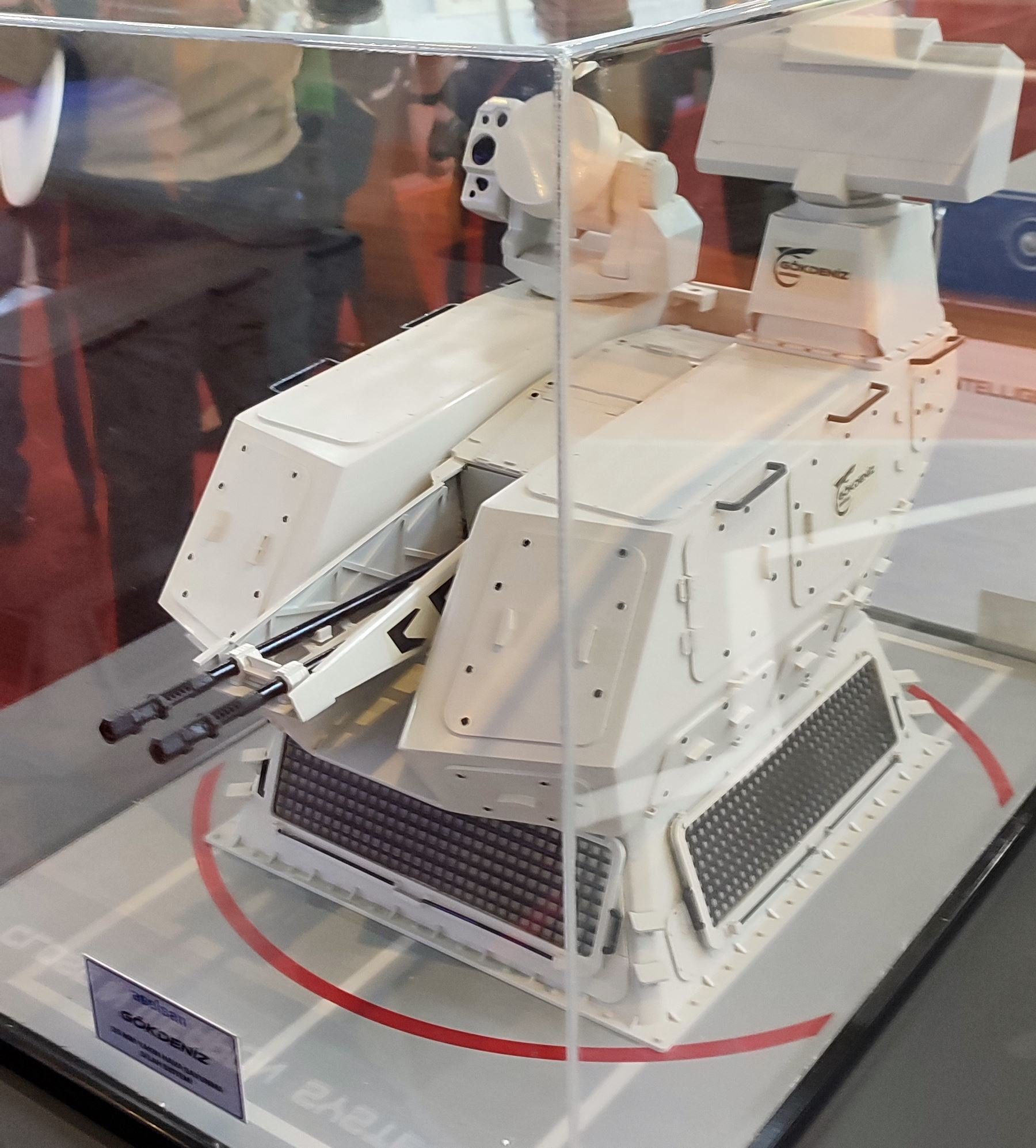
- Scale model in 2022
- Type: Gun-based CIWS
- Place of origin: Turkey

Production history
- Designer: Aselsan
- Manufacturer: Aselsan
- Produced: 2019-Present

Specifications
- Shell: 35×228mm ATOM, 35×228mm HEI-T
- Shell weight: ATOM 35mm: 1.750 kg (3 lb 14 oz); HEI-T: 1.565 kg (3 lb 7 oz)
- Caliber: 35 mm (1.38 in)
- Barrels: 2
- Action: Gas-operated
- Traverse: 360°
- Rate of fire: 1100 rpm (2 x 550 rpm)
- Muzzle velocity: ATOM 35mm: 1,020 m/s (3,300 ft/s); HEI-T: 1,175 m/s (3,850 ft/s)
- Effective firing range: 4,000 metres (13,000 ft)
- Feed system: Automatic linkless

The Aselsan Gökdeniz complex along with Aselsan ATOM 35mm airburst ammunition is an all-weather-capable Turkish 35 mm dual barrel close-in weapon system (CIWS) developed by Aselsan. It is a CIWS variant of KORKUT Self-propelled anti-aircraft gun.

Each GOKDENIZ platform carries a variant of Oerlikon 35 mm twin cannon, manufactured under licence by MKEK. The CIWS system, sensors and electronics manufactured by Aselsan. The CIWS can fire up to 1100 rounds a minute up to an effective range of 4 km.

== Purpose ==
The system's primary purpose is to defend against anti-ship missiles, unmanned aerial vehicles and other precision-guided munitions. It can also be employed against conventional and rotary-wing aircraft, surface ships, small water-crafts, coastal targets and floating mines.

== Ammunition ==
The cannons fire 35×228 mm Aselsan ATOM 35mm airburst round and high-explosive incendiary (HEI) ammunition.

In the anti-missile role it uses ATOM 35mm airburst ammunition from Aselsan. This round ejects tungsten pellets at a predetermined distance. It is a smart ammunition which has a base fuse. Together with the ability of precise time counting and the capability of being programmed during firing by taking muzzle velocity into consideration automatically sets the fuse to detonate the round as it approaches a pre-set distance from the target. Whilst a single pellet is too small to do major damage in itself, the accumulation of damage from multiple strikes is designed to destroy wings and control surfaces, sensors and aerodynamics, causing the target to crash. According to Aselsan, the ammunition is resistant against electromagnetic jamming.

The system allows loading of both ammunition at the same time and it can switch between ammunition type with automatic linkless ammunition feed mechanism when needed during the operation.

== Variant ==
=== GOKDENIZ ER ===
This is a further variation of the GOKDENIZ close-in weapon system. It was one of the two point-defense weapon systems from Turkey presented during the International Defense Exhibition and Fair (IDEF) 21. The GOKDENIZ-ER will operate independently of ship sensors and systems, be armed with 11 missiles, and provide 360-degree coverage through AESA radar and electro-optical sensors.

The system is still under development. It be developed independently of ROKETSAN's Levent system, and is seen as an alternative to SeaRAM Block-2. The system will have less missiles than Levent, but the missiles will be larger. Because of the involvement of TÜBTAK-SAGE in the project, it is expected that the surface-to-air version of the Bozdogan missile, an indigenous air-to-air missile produced by TÜBTAK-SAGE, will be preferred. Nonetheless, the possibility of employing a more powerful and larger version of the SUNGUR Missiles is also being considered.

== Operators ==
- Turkish Navy: Used on Istanbul-class frigates and Barbaros-class frigates
- Turkmen Naval Forces: Used on Turkmen-class corvettes
- Pakistan Navy: Used on Babur-class corvettes
- Philippine Navy: Used on Miguel Malvar-class frigate
- Ukrainian Navy: Used on Ada-class corvettes Hetman Ivan Mazepa and Hetman Ivan Vyhovsky

== See also ==
- Rheinmetall Oerlikon Millennium Gun - comparable Swiss-German system
- MANTIS Air Defence System - ground-based C-RAM by Rheinmetall using same gun
- Oerlikon GDF - earlier system using AHEAD rounds
- Denel 35mm Dual Purpose Gun -z comparable South African CIWS
- OSU-35K - comparable Polish system
- AG-35 and A-35 35mm - Polish ground based single barrel anti aircraft gun systems
