= Gezgin missile =

Turkish cruise missile

The Gezgin missile, also GEZGIN (Note: "Gezgin" means "traveler" in Turkish) is a cruise missile of the military of Turkey under development. It is compared to the Tomahawk missile of the United States. Its range is not officially disclosed, but expert estimate it to exceed 1,000 km, i.e., larger than the range of current Turkish missiles SOM and ATMACA. The missile can be launched from land vehicles, surface warships and submarines, and air. The first launch reported by media was in May 2025. It is being developed by TÜBİTAK SAGE. The company compared in to Gökhan.

Plans to develop it were revealed in 2017.

The official information is scarce. A March 2025 report of the Turkish Navy stated in part:

Within the scope of the procurement of the GEZGİN National Joint Cruise Missile, which will provide the capability for long-range and deep attacks against critical land targets, Capsule-based Cruise Missile Mass Equivalent Launches were successfully carried out in Aksaz using the Submarine Test Infrastructure (DATA) designed and produced by TÜBİTAK SAGE. Harmonization studies with the G/M's National Vertical Launch Launcher System (MİDLAS) are ongoing.

== Technical details ==
In 2021 it was reported that Ukrainian Motor Sich proposed to develop the small size MS400 turbofan engine for Gezgin. Earlier, in 2020, it was reported that Ivchenko-Progress would develop AI-35 engine for Gezgin.

MiDLAS vertical launching system is capable of launching Gezgin.
