= SSTD =

Surface Ship Torpedo Defence

The United Kingdom Surface Ship Torpedo Defence (SSTD) system entered into service with the Royal Navy in 2004. The system is produced by Ultra Electronics and is known as S2170 or Sonar 2170 by the Royal Navy and as Sea Sentor in the export market.

The system consists of

- an acoustic passive towed array
- a towed acoustic countermeasure (flexible)
- a single-drum winch
- a processing cabinet
- 2 display consoles
- 2 expendable acoustic device launchers (1 port, 1 starboard)
- 16 expendable acoustic devices (8 in each launcher)

The system is a footprint compatible replacement for the AN/SLQ-25 Nixie system previously installed on RN warships.

The passive acoustic towed array is specifically designed to detect torpedoes (unlike traditional ASW sonars) and has additional in-built non-acoustic as well as acoustic intercept sensors. Through advanced AI processing it is able to generically identify torpedoes as well as classify specific weapon types and modes and undertake threat evaluation and posturing analysis. The system provides tactical advice dependent upon the specific threat weapon, mode and posture to maximise vessel survivability, which typically involves vessel manoeuvres and also includes the deployment of countermeasures. The countermeasures - both towed and expendable variants - lure the threat away from the vessel in a soft-kill manner.

Ultra Electronics also produces a hard-kill variant known as the TRAPR DCL system currently under development for the US Navy.
