= Atmaca =

Turkish anti-ship missile

ATMACA
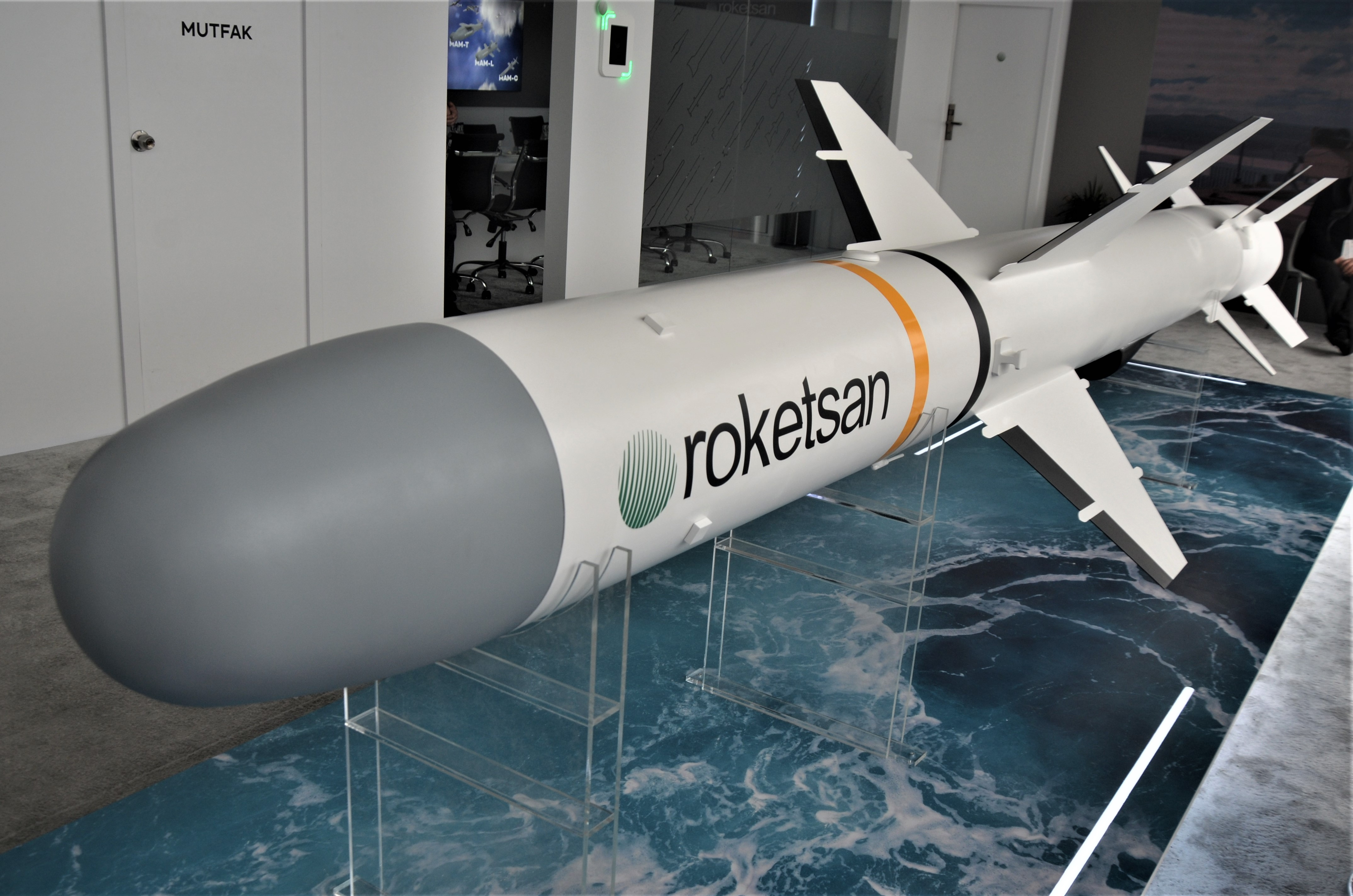
- The Atmaca Missile at Teknofest in 2023
- Type: Anti-ship cruise missile Surface-to-surface missile Submarine-launched cruise missile
- Place of origin: Turkey

Service history
- In service: 2020
- Used by: See Users

Production history
- Designer: Roketsan
- Designed: 2009-2018
- Manufacturer: Roketsan
- Produced: 2018
- No. built: Unknown
- Variants: See Variants

Specifications
- Mass: Navy version: 750 kg Army version: 890 kg
- Length: 4,800 - 5,200 mm
- Diameter: 350 mm
- Wingspan: 1.4 m
- Effective firing range: Navy version: 250 km Land version: 400 km
- Warhead: High-explosive penetrating warhead
- Warhead weight: Navy version: 220 kg Army version: 250 kg
- Engine: Kale KTJ-3200; Kale KTJ-3700; Microturbo TRI-40(First versions)
- Propellant: Aviation-grade kerosene
- Maximum speed: 0.85-0.90 Mach
- Guidance system: INS/GPS+RA+DL
- Launch platform: Frigates; Corvettes; Submarine; Patrol boats; Coastal defense batteries; Unmanned surface vehicle

Atmaca (Accipiter) is an all-weather, long-range, precision strike, anti-ship, surface-to-surface and submarine-launched cruise missile, developed by Turkish missile manufacturer Roketsan. The Atmaca has entered service with the Turkish Navy to gradually replace the country's existing inventory of Harpoon missiles. The Surface-to-surface version of Atmaca is Kara Atmaca. The missile also offered for export.

== Development ==
The program was initiated in 2009 when Turkey's Undersecretary For Defense Industries (SSM) signed a contract with Roketsan for designing a surface-to-surface cruise missile for the requirements of the Turkish Naval Forces. The prime contractor, Roketsan, started the design studies in September 2012, after receiving the results of its previous research and development contract with Turkey's Undersecretary For Defense Industries under the coordination of Navy Research Center Command (ARMERKOM). The missile is planned to be developed for multiplatforms, capable of launching not only from warships but also from submarines, aircraft, coastal batteries, including land-attack operations.

After completing various tests, first land-based firing of the Atmaca took place in March 2017. The serial production contract for Atmaca was signed between Roketsan and the Presidency of Defense Industry on 29 October 2018. The missile will be deployed to Turkish Navy's Ada-class corvettes, Istanbul-class frigates, G-class frigates, Hisar-class offshore patrol vessels, and planned TF-2000-class destroyers.

== Design ==
The missile makes use of its global positioning system (GPS), inertial navigation system, barometric altimeter and radar altimeter to navigate towards its target, while its active radar seeker pinpoints the target with high precision. With a range of more than 220 kilometres (140 mi), this guided missile poses a major threat for targets situated beyond the line of sight due to its high explosive fragmentation warhead. Its modern data-link provides ATMACA with the ability to 3D mission planning, update targets, reattack and terminate the mission. Missile is ultra sea-skimming as it approaches the target. The missile's engines are manufactured by the Turkish Kale Group, and the Kale KTJ-3200 engine used by the first versions of the missile is produced in Türkiye as ITAR-Free.

== Timeline ==
- On 3 November 2019, the Turkish Naval Forces successfully conducted its first ship-launched firing from the Ada-class corvette TCG Kınalıada in the Black sea.
- On 1 July 2020, the Atmaca missile successfully hit its target from a >200 km range.
- On February 3, 2021, the Atmaca anti-ship missile successfully hit the target in the test fire with the TCG Kınalıada corvette using a "live warhead" in Sinop.
- In June 2021 the Atmaca missile successfully hit the ex-TCG Işın (A-589) ship under the certification test. Marking the start of its serial production.
- In June 2021, the Atmaca completed 20 successful test firing and expected to be certified this year for Ada-class corvette.
- In August 2023, Turkey announced that 11 ships would be equipped.
- On March 10, 2024, the Atmaca missile has successfully hit its target with Türkiye's first domestic and national Turbojet Engine Kale KTJ-3200, developed by Kale Ar-Ge.
- On March 12, 2025, in a test conducted, the Atmaca missile was successfully fired from a submarine for the first time.

== Land version ==
It was announced that a longer-range land version of the missile, which can be fired from mobile vehicles, is also being developed. Roketsan CEO İkinci emphasized that a lot of work is ongoing and the range of Kara Atmaca is increasing very quickly.

- On August 18, 2024, the KARA ATMACA UM (Long Range) cruise missile, a land-based variant of the Atmaca, successfully completed a long-range test firing, hitting its target with high accuracy. KARA ATMACA is expected to enter service in 2025.
- On March 3, 2025, a new firing test was carried out for the land version of the missile. According to some Turkish defense industry experts, the missile exceeded a range above 400 km during the tests.
- On 7 April 2026 Roketsan did first delivery to the Army.

== Operators ==
=== Current operators ===
Turkey

- Turkish Navy
- Turkish Land Forces

=== Future operators ===
Indonesia

- Indonesian Navy - On 2 November 2022, Indonesia has signed a contract for the purchase of Atmaca missiles. According to reports from Janes in January 2024, Indonesia acquired 45 Atmaca missiles for the initial batch.

Malaysia

- Royal Malaysian Navy - To be installed on future Maharaja Lela-class frigate and Tunku-class littoral mission ship.

=== Potential operators ===
Algeria

- Algerian National Navy – On 3 June 2022, it was revealed Algeria reported to acquire Atmaca missiles.

== See also ==
- Nirbhay – (India)
- BrahMos – (India, Russia)
- NASM-MR – (India)
- AGM-158C LRASM – (United States)
- C-802 – (China)
- Babur – (Pakistan)
- Exocet – (France)
- Switchblade Kh-35 – (Russia)
- Harpoon – (United States)
- Naval Strike Missile – (Norway)
- RBS 15 – (Sweden)
- MBDA Otomat – (Italy, France)
- Sea Eagle – (United Kingdom)
- SSM-700K C-Star – (South Korea)
- Type 80 air-to-ship missile – (Japan)
- Type 88 surface-to-ship missile – (Japan)
- Type 90 ship-to-ship missile – (Japan)
- Type 93 air-to-ship missile – (Japan)
- Gabriel (missile) – (Israel)
- Hsiung Feng II – (Taiwan)
- ASM-3 – (Japan)
- AS.34 Kormoran – (Germany)
