= Aselsan STAMP =

SMASH 200/12.7 STAMP
- Type: Remote controlled weapon station
- Place of origin: Turkey

Production history
- Designer: Aselsan
- Manufacturer: Aselsan
- Variants: Aselsan STAMP-2, Aselsan STAMP-G

Specifications
- Mass: Above deck: 200 kilograms (440 lb) - 220 kilograms (490 lb) (Including gun and 200 rds ammunition); Below deck: 40 kilograms (88 lb) - 50 kilograms (110 lb)
- Crew: 1
- Caliber: 7.62 mm / 12.7 mm/ 40 mm grenade
- Elevation: -15° to +55°
- Traverse: 360°
- Feed system: Single
- Sights: Thermal camera, TV camera and laser range finder

The STAMP is a family of lightweight remote controlled weapon stations manufactured by Aselsan of Turkey. It can be fitted with either a 7.62 mm / 12.7 mm machine gun or a 40 mm automatic grenade launcher.

== Overview ==
The system stabilizer allows gun to remain on target as the platform beneath it moves. The mounting does not penetrate the platform, making it relatively simple to fit the weapon to ships. Its modular structure enables for upgrades and options according to customer needs. Similar to most other small caliber RCWS its electroptical suit is fixed with its gun. However, Aselsan made an upgraded variant STAMP-2 which has a surveillance mode with independently movable electroptical suit.

200 (12.7 mm) rounds are carried on the mounting inside magazine. The mount can traverse 360° when elevate between -15° and +55°. The system can be used during day and night under various weather. There is also a manual operation mode as a back-up.

== STAMP-G ==
Although the system is a variant of STAMP, it is mainly designed to be fitted with the 12.7 mm GAU-19/A three-barrel rotary heavy machine gun. It can also be fitted with either a 12.7 mm M2HB heavy machine gun, 7.62 mm FN Minimi light machine gun or a 40 mm MK 19 automatic grenade launcher. The system stabilizer allows gun to remain on target as the platform beneath it moves. The mounting does not penetrate the platform (except cables), making it relatively simple to fit the weapon to ships. Its modular structure enables for upgrades and options according to customer needs. 500 (12.7 mm) rounds are carried on the mounting inside magazine. The mount can traverse 360° when elevate between -15° and +55°. The system can be used during day and night under various weather. There is also a manual operation mode as a back-up.
