= List of active ships of the Turkish Naval Forces =

The Turkish Naval Forces or Turkish Navy is the naval warfare service branch of the Turkish Armed Forces.

== Submarine fleet ==
Submarine fleet
(14 active) + ( 4 on order)
Class	Boat	Pennant No.	Commissioned	Displacement	Type	Homeport	Note
Atılay class	TCG Batıray	S349	1978	1,185 tonnes	Attack submarine	Bartın	Type 209. S-351 Doğanay and S-352 Dolunay received modernizations, including new periscopes, ESM, and inertial navigation systems. TCG Batıray & Yıldıray are used for test and training. The first three submarines were built by Howaldtswerke-Deutsche Werft of Germany, TCG Yıldıray, TCG Doğanay and TCG Dolunay by the Gölcük Naval Shipyard.
Atılay class	TCG Yıldıray	S350	1981	1,185 tonnes	Attack submarine	Bartın	Type 209. S-351 Doğanay and S-352 Dolunay received modernizations, including new periscopes, ESM, and inertial navigation systems. TCG Batıray & Yıldıray are used for test and training. The first three submarines were built by Howaldtswerke-Deutsche Werft of Germany, TCG Yıldıray, TCG Doğanay and TCG Dolunay by the Gölcük Naval Shipyard.
Atılay class	TCG Doğanay	S351	1984	1,185 tonnes	Attack submarine	Bartın	Type 209. S-351 Doğanay and S-352 Dolunay received modernizations, including new periscopes, ESM, and inertial navigation systems. TCG Batıray & Yıldıray are used for test and training. The first three submarines were built by Howaldtswerke-Deutsche Werft of Germany, TCG Yıldıray, TCG Doğanay and TCG Dolunay by the Gölcük Naval Shipyard.
Atılay class	TCG Dolunay	S352	1989	1,185 tonnes	Attack submarine	Bartın	Type 209. S-351 Doğanay and S-352 Dolunay received modernizations, including new periscopes, ESM, and inertial navigation systems. TCG Batıray & Yıldıray are used for test and training. The first three submarines were built by Howaldtswerke-Deutsche Werft of Germany, TCG Yıldıray, TCG Doğanay and TCG Dolunay by the Gölcük Naval Shipyard.
Preveze class	TCG Preveze	S353	1994	1,586 tonnes	Attack submarine	Bartın	Type 209. TCG Preveze & Sakarya underwent mid-Life upgrades.
Preveze class	TCG Sakarya	S354	1995	1,586 tonnes	Attack submarine	Bartın	Type 209. TCG Preveze & Sakarya underwent mid-Life upgrades.
Preveze class	TCG 18 Mart	S355	1998	1,586 tonnes	Attack submarine	Bartın	Type 209. TCG Preveze & Sakarya underwent mid-Life upgrades.
Preveze class	TCG Anafartalar	S356	1999	1,586 tonnes	Attack submarine	Bartın	Type 209. TCG Preveze & Sakarya underwent mid-Life upgrades.
Gür class	TCG Gür	S357	2003	1,586 tonnes	Attack submarine	Bartın	Type 209. Received mid-life upgrades. Built by the Gölcük Naval Shipyard
Gür class	TCG Çanakkale	S358	2005	1,586 tonnes	Attack submarine	Bartın	Type 209. Received mid-life upgrades. Built by the Gölcük Naval Shipyard
Gür class	TCG Burakreis	S359	2006	1,586 tonnes	Attack submarine	Bartın	Type 209. Received mid-life upgrades. Built by the Gölcük Naval Shipyard
Gür class	TCG B.İnönü	S360	2007	1,586 tonnes	Attack submarine	Bartın	Type 209. Received mid-life upgrades. Built by the Gölcük Naval Shipyard
Reis class	TCG Piri Reis	S-330	2024	1,850 tons	Attack submarine	Aksaz	Type 214. Built by the Gölcük Naval Shipyard.
Reis class	TCG Hızır Reis	S-331	2025	1,850 tons	Attack submarine	Aksaz	Type 214. Built by the Gölcük Naval Shipyard.
Reis class	TCG Murat Reis	S-332	2026	1,850 tons	Attack submarine	Aksaz	Type 214. Built by the Gölcük Naval Shipyard.
Reis class	TCG Aydın Reis	S-333		1,850 tons	Attack submarine	Aksaz	Type 214. Built by the Gölcük Naval Shipyard.
Reis class	TCG Seydi Ali Reis	S-334		1,850 tons	Attack submarine	Aksaz	Type 214. Built by the Gölcük Naval Shipyard.
Reis class	TCG Selman Reis	S-335		1,850 tons	Attack submarine	Aksaz	Type 214. Built by the Gölcük Naval Shipyard.

== Surface fleet ==
=== Combatant ships ===
Surface fleet
Drone carrier-Amphibious assault ships (1)
Class	Boat	No.	Commissioned	Displacement	Type	Homeport	Note
Anadolu class	TCG Anadolu	L-400	2023	27,436 tonnes	LHD/LHA	Gölcük	Flagship of the Turkish Navy and world's first UAV carrier. Based on Spanish Juan Carlos I. Built by Sedef Shipyard.
Frigates (17 active) + (7 on order)
Class	Boat	No.	Commissioned	Displacement	Type	Homeport	Note
Yavuz class	TCG Yavuz	F-240	1987	3,030 tonnes	Multirole	Gölcük	TCG Fatih is used for test and training.DE MEKO 200TN Track; Underwent electronic warfare suite upgrades. TCG Yavuz & Turgutreis were built by Blohm&Voss. TCG Fatih & Yıldırım were built by Gölcük Naval Shipyard. TCG Yavuz undergoing decomission and will be used as a museum ship.
Yavuz class	TCG Turgutreis	F-241	1988	3,030 tonnes	Multirole	Gölcük	TCG Fatih is used for test and training.DE MEKO 200TN Track; Underwent electronic warfare suite upgrades. TCG Yavuz & Turgutreis were built by Blohm&Voss. TCG Fatih & Yıldırım were built by Gölcük Naval Shipyard. TCG Yavuz undergoing decomission and will be used as a museum ship.
Yavuz class	TCG Fatih	F-242	1988	3,030 tonnes	Multirole	Gölcük	TCG Fatih is used for test and training.DE MEKO 200TN Track; Underwent electronic warfare suite upgrades. TCG Yavuz & Turgutreis were built by Blohm&Voss. TCG Fatih & Yıldırım were built by Gölcük Naval Shipyard. TCG Yavuz undergoing decomission and will be used as a museum ship.
Yavuz class	TCG Yıldırım	F-243	1989	3,030 tonnes	Multirole	Gölcük	TCG Fatih is used for test and training.DE MEKO 200TN Track; Underwent electronic warfare suite upgrades. TCG Yavuz & Turgutreis were built by Blohm&Voss. TCG Fatih & Yıldırım were built by Gölcük Naval Shipyard. TCG Yavuz undergoing decomission and will be used as a museum ship.
Barbaros class	TCG Barbaros	F-244	1997	3,350 tonnes	Multirole	Gölcük	DE MEKO 200TNTrackII. Undergoing mid-life upgrades. TCG Barbaros & Salihreis were built in Germany by Blohm&Voss. TCG Oruçreis & Kemalreis were built by Gölcük Naval Shipyard.
Barbaros class	TCG Oruçreis	F-245	1997	3,350 tonnes	Multirole	Gölcük	DE MEKO 200TNTrackII. Undergoing mid-life upgrades. TCG Barbaros & Salihreis were built in Germany by Blohm&Voss. TCG Oruçreis & Kemalreis were built by Gölcük Naval Shipyard.
Barbaros class	TCG Salihreis	F-246	1998	3,350 tonnes	Multirole	Gölcük	DE MEKO 200TNTrackII. Undergoing mid-life upgrades. TCG Barbaros & Salihreis were built in Germany by Blohm&Voss. TCG Oruçreis & Kemalreis were built by Gölcük Naval Shipyard.
Barbaros class	TCG Kemalreis	F-247	2000	3,350 tonnes	Multirole	Gölcük	DE MEKO 200TNTrackII. Undergoing mid-life upgrades. TCG Barbaros & Salihreis were built in Germany by Blohm&Voss. TCG Oruçreis & Kemalreis were built by Gölcük Naval Shipyard.
Gabya class	TCG Gaziantep	F-490	1997	4,166 tonnes	Multirole	Aksaz	Extensively modernized versions of ex-Oliver Hazard Perry class with advanced combat management, new long-range radar, sonar and weapon systems.
Gabya class	TCG Giresun	F-491	1997	4,166 tonnes	Multirole	Aksaz	Extensively modernized versions of ex-Oliver Hazard Perry class with advanced combat management, new long-range radar, sonar and weapon systems.
Gabya class	TCG Gemlik	F-492	1998	4,166 tonnes	Multirole	Aksaz	Extensively modernized versions of ex-Oliver Hazard Perry class with advanced combat management, new long-range radar, sonar and weapon systems.
Gabya class	TCG Gelibolu	F-493	1999	4,166 tonnes	Multirole	Aksaz	Extensively modernized versions of ex-Oliver Hazard Perry class with advanced combat management, new long-range radar, sonar and weapon systems.
Gabya class	TCG Gökçeada	F-494	1999	4,166 tonnes	Multirole	Aksaz	Extensively modernized versions of ex-Oliver Hazard Perry class with advanced combat management, new long-range radar, sonar and weapon systems.
Gabya class	TCG Gediz	F-495	2000	4,166 tonnes	Multirole	Aksaz	Extensively modernized versions of ex-Oliver Hazard Perry class with advanced combat management, new long-range radar, sonar and weapon systems.
Gabya class	TCG Gökova	F-496	2002	4,166 tonnes	Multirole	Aksaz	Extensively modernized versions of ex-Oliver Hazard Perry class with advanced combat management, new long-range radar, sonar and weapon systems.
Gabya class	TCG Göksu	F-497	2003	4,166 tonnes	Multirole	Aksaz	Extensively modernized versions of ex-Oliver Hazard Perry class with advanced combat management, new long-range radar, sonar and weapon systems.
Istif class	TCG Istanbul	F-515	2024	3,100 tonnes	Multirole	Gölcük	Enlarged MILGEMs. TCG Istanbul is built by the Istanbul Naval Shipyard. The rest of the class are being built by a consortium consisting of Anadolu Shipyard, Sedef Shipyard and Sefine Shipyard.
Istif class	TCG İzmir	F-516		3,100 tonnes	Multirole	Gölcük	Enlarged MILGEMs. TCG Istanbul is built by the Istanbul Naval Shipyard. The rest of the class are being built by a consortium consisting of Anadolu Shipyard, Sedef Shipyard and Sefine Shipyard.
Istif class	TCG İzmit	F-517		3,100 tonnes	Multirole	Gölcük	Enlarged MILGEMs. TCG Istanbul is built by the Istanbul Naval Shipyard. The rest of the class are being built by a consortium consisting of Anadolu Shipyard, Sedef Shipyard and Sefine Shipyard.
Istif class	TCG İçel	F-518		3,100 tonnes	Multirole	Gölcük	Enlarged MILGEMs. TCG Istanbul is built by the Istanbul Naval Shipyard. The rest of the class are being built by a consortium consisting of Anadolu Shipyard, Sedef Shipyard and Sefine Shipyard.
Istif class	TCG Akdeniz	F-519		3,100 tonnes	Multirole	Gölcük	Enlarged MILGEMs. TCG Istanbul is built by the Istanbul Naval Shipyard. The rest of the class are being built by a consortium consisting of Anadolu Shipyard, Sedef Shipyard and Sefine Shipyard.
Istif class	TCG Karadeniz	F-520		3,100 tonnes	Multirole	Gölcük	Enlarged MILGEMs. TCG Istanbul is built by the Istanbul Naval Shipyard. The rest of the class are being built by a consortium consisting of Anadolu Shipyard, Sedef Shipyard and Sefine Shipyard.
Istif class	TCG Ege	F-521		3,100 tonnes	Multirole	Gölcük	Enlarged MILGEMs. TCG Istanbul is built by the Istanbul Naval Shipyard. The rest of the class are being built by a consortium consisting of Anadolu Shipyard, Sedef Shipyard and Sefine Shipyard.
Istif class	TCG Marmara	F-522		3,100 tonnes	Multirole	Gölcük	Enlarged MILGEMs. TCG Istanbul is built by the Istanbul Naval Shipyard. The rest of the class are being built by a consortium consisting of Anadolu Shipyard, Sedef Shipyard and Sefine Shipyard.
Corvettes (4)
Class	Boat	No.	Commissioned	Displacement	Type	Homeport	Note
Ada class	TCG Heybeliada	F-511	2011	2,300 tonnes	ASW	Gölcük	First phase of the MILGEM project. Built by the Istanbul Naval Shipyard.
Ada class	TCG Büyükada	F-512	2013	2,300 tonnes	ASW	Gölcük	First phase of the MILGEM project. Built by the Istanbul Naval Shipyard.
Ada class	TCG Burgazada	F-513	2018	2,300 tonnes	ASW	Gölcük	First phase of the MILGEM project. Built by the Istanbul Naval Shipyard.
Ada class	TCG Kınalıada	F-514	2019	2,300 tonnes	ASW	Gölcük	First phase of the MILGEM project. Built by the Istanbul Naval Shipyard.
Patrol Vessels (22 active) + (9 on order)
Class	Boat	No.	Commissioned	Displacement	Type	Homeport	Note
Hisar class	TCG Koçhisar (P-1221)	P-1221	2026	2,300 tonnes	Offshore patrol vessel	Aksaz	Revised MILGEMs. Five more ships with improvements are planned as second batch. The first two ships were built by ASFAT. Four ships are being built by a consortium led by DEARSAN.
Hisar class	TCG Seferihisar	P-1222		2,300 tonnes	Offshore patrol vessel	Aksaz	Revised MILGEMs. Five more ships with improvements are planned as second batch. The first two ships were built by ASFAT. Four ships are being built by a consortium led by DEARSAN.
Hisar class		P-1223		2,300 tonnes	Offshore patrol vessel	Aksaz	Revised MILGEMs. Five more ships with improvements are planned as second batch. The first two ships were built by ASFAT. Four ships are being built by a consortium led by DEARSAN.
Hisar class		P-1224		2,300 tonnes	Offshore patrol vessel	Aksaz	Revised MILGEMs. Five more ships with improvements are planned as second batch. The first two ships were built by ASFAT. Four ships are being built by a consortium led by DEARSAN.
Hisar class		P-1225		2,300 tonnes	Offshore patrol vessel	Aksaz	Revised MILGEMs. Five more ships with improvements are planned as second batch. The first two ships were built by ASFAT. Four ships are being built by a consortium led by DEARSAN.
Burak class	TCG Bozcaada	F-500	2001	1,325 tonnes	Offshore patrol vessel	Gölcük	Ex-D'Estienne d'Orves-class avisos. Served as Corvettes until 2023. TCG Beykoz is used for test and training. ex D'Estienne d'Orves-class avisos. Received electro-optical modernization.
Burak class	TCG Bandırma	F-502	2001	1,325 tonnes	Offshore patrol vessel	Gölcük	Ex-D'Estienne d'Orves-class avisos. Served as Corvettes until 2023. TCG Beykoz is used for test and training. ex D'Estienne d'Orves-class avisos. Received electro-optical modernization.
Burak class	TCG Beykoz	F-503	2002	1,325 tonnes	Offshore patrol vessel	Gölcük	Ex-D'Estienne d'Orves-class avisos. Served as Corvettes until 2023. TCG Beykoz is used for test and training. ex D'Estienne d'Orves-class avisos. Received electro-optical modernization.
Burak class	TCG Bartın	F-504	2002	1,325 tonnes	Offshore patrol vessel	Gölcük	Ex-D'Estienne d'Orves-class avisos. Served as Corvettes until 2023. TCG Beykoz is used for test and training. ex D'Estienne d'Orves-class avisos. Received electro-optical modernization.
Burak class	TCG Bafra	F-505	2002	1,325 tonnes	Offshore patrol vessel	Gölcük	Ex-D'Estienne d'Orves-class avisos. Served as Corvettes until 2023. TCG Beykoz is used for test and training. ex D'Estienne d'Orves-class avisos. Received electro-optical modernization.
Tuzla class	TCG Tuzla	P-1200	2011	406 tonnes	Inshore patrol vessel	Aksaz	Built by DEARSAN.
Tuzla class	TCG Karaburun	P-1201	2011	406 tonnes	Inshore patrol vessel	Aksaz	Built by DEARSAN.
Tuzla class	TCG Köyceğiz	P-1202	2011	406 tonnes	Inshore patrol vessel	Aksaz	Built by DEARSAN.
Tuzla class	TCG Kumkale	P-1203	2012	406 tonnes	Inshore patrol vessel	Aksaz	Built by DEARSAN.
Tuzla class	TCG Tarsus	P-1204	2012	406 tonnes	Inshore patrol vessel	Aksaz	Built by DEARSAN.
Tuzla class	TCG Karabiga	P-1205	2012	406 tonnes	Inshore patrol vessel	Aksaz	Built by DEARSAN.
Tuzla class	TCG Karşıyaka	P-1206	2012	406 tonnes	Inshore patrol vessel	Aksaz	Built by DEARSAN.
Tuzla class	TCG Tekirdağ	P-1207	2013	406 tonnes	Inshore patrol vessel	Aksaz	Built by DEARSAN.
Tuzla class	TCG Kaş	P-1208	2013	406 tonnes	Inshore patrol vessel	Aksaz	Built by DEARSAN.
Tuzla class	TCG Kilimli	P-1209	2013	406 tonnes	Inshore patrol vessel	Aksaz	Built by DEARSAN.
Tuzla class	TCG Türkeli	P-1210	2013	406 tonnes	Inshore patrol vessel	Aksaz	Built by DEARSAN.
Tuzla class	TCG Taşucu	P-1211	2014	406 tonnes	Inshore patrol vessel	Aksaz	Built by DEARSAN.
Tuzla class	TCG Karataş	P-1212	2014	406 tonnes	Inshore patrol vessel	Aksaz	Built by DEARSAN.
Tuzla class	TCG Karpaz	P-1213	2014	406 tonnes	Inshore patrol vessel	Aksaz	Built by DEARSAN.
Tuzla class	TCG Karadeniz Ereğli	P-1214	2014	406 tonnes	Inshore patrol vessel	Aksaz	Built by DEARSAN.
Tuzla class	TCG Kuşadası	P-1215	2014	406 tonnes	Inshore patrol vessel	Aksaz	Built by DEARSAN.
Fast attack craft (17)
Class	Boat	No.	Commissioned	Displacement	Type	Homeport	Note
Doğan class	TCG Doğan	P-340	1977	443 tonnes	Missile boat	Gölcük	TCG Tayfun is used for test and training. Received new electronic support measures suite upgrades. TCG Martı (P-341) was decommissioned. TCG Doğan were built by Lürssen-Werft. The rest of the class (P-341, P-342 & P-343) were built by the Gölcük Naval Shipyard.
Doğan class	TCG Tayfun	P-342	1979	443 tonnes	Missile boat	Gölcük	TCG Tayfun is used for test and training. Received new electronic support measures suite upgrades. TCG Martı (P-341) was decommissioned. TCG Doğan were built by Lürssen-Werft. The rest of the class (P-341, P-342 & P-343) were built by the Gölcük Naval Shipyard.
Rüzgar class	TCG Rüzgar	P-344	1986	417 tonnes	Missile boat	Gölcük	Received new Electronic Support Measures suite upgrades. Built by Taşkızak Naval Shipyard.
Rüzgar class	TCG Poyraz	P-345	1987	417 tonnes	Missile boat	Gölcük	Received new Electronic Support Measures suite upgrades. Built by Taşkızak Naval Shipyard.
Rüzgar class	TCG Gurbet	P-346	1987	417 tonnes	Missile boat	Gölcük	Received new Electronic Support Measures suite upgrades. Built by Taşkızak Naval Shipyard.
Rüzgar class	TCG Fırtına	P-347	1988	417 tonnes	Missile boat	Gölcük	Received new Electronic Support Measures suite upgrades. Built by Taşkızak Naval Shipyard.
Yıldız class	TCG Yıldız	P-330	1998	440 tonnes	Missile boat	Gölcük	Received indigenous SATCOM and EW upgrades. Built by Taşkızak Naval Shipyard.
Yıldız class	TCG Karayel	P-349	1997	440 tonnes	Missile boat	Gölcük	Received indigenous SATCOM and EW upgrades. Built by Taşkızak Naval Shipyard.
Kılıç class	TCG Kılıç	P-348	1997	552 tonnes	Missile boat	Aksaz	Received new electronic support measures suite upgrades. TCG Kılıç & TCG Tufan were built by Lürssen-Werft. The rest of the class were built by Taşkızak and Gölcük Naval Shipyards.
Kılıç class	TCG Kalkan	P-331	1999	552 tonnes	Missile boat	Aksaz	Received new electronic support measures suite upgrades. TCG Kılıç & TCG Tufan were built by Lürssen-Werft. The rest of the class were built by Taşkızak and Gölcük Naval Shipyards.
Kılıç class	TCG Mızrak	P-332	2000	552 tonnes	Missile boat	Aksaz	Received new electronic support measures suite upgrades. TCG Kılıç & TCG Tufan were built by Lürssen-Werft. The rest of the class were built by Taşkızak and Gölcük Naval Shipyards.
Kılıç class	TCG Tufan	P-333	2005	552 tonnes	Missile boat	Aksaz	Received new electronic support measures suite upgrades. TCG Kılıç & TCG Tufan were built by Lürssen-Werft. The rest of the class were built by Taşkızak and Gölcük Naval Shipyards.
Kılıç class	TCG Meltem	P-334	2005	552 tonnes	Missile boat	Aksaz	Received new electronic support measures suite upgrades. TCG Kılıç & TCG Tufan were built by Lürssen-Werft. The rest of the class were built by Taşkızak and Gölcük Naval Shipyards.
Kılıç class	TCG İmbat	P-335	2007	552 tonnes	Missile boat	Aksaz	Received new electronic support measures suite upgrades. TCG Kılıç & TCG Tufan were built by Lürssen-Werft. The rest of the class were built by Taşkızak and Gölcük Naval Shipyards.
Kılıç class	TCG Zıpkın	P-336	2007	552 tonnes	Missile boat	Aksaz	Received new electronic support measures suite upgrades. TCG Kılıç & TCG Tufan were built by Lürssen-Werft. The rest of the class were built by Taşkızak and Gölcük Naval Shipyards.
Kılıç class	TCG Atak	P-337	2009	552 tonnes	Missile boat	Aksaz	Received new electronic support measures suite upgrades. TCG Kılıç & TCG Tufan were built by Lürssen-Werft. The rest of the class were built by Taşkızak and Gölcük Naval Shipyards.
Kılıç class	TCG Bora	P-338	2010	552 tonnes	Missile boat	Aksaz	Received new electronic support measures suite upgrades. TCG Kılıç & TCG Tufan were built by Lürssen-Werft. The rest of the class were built by Taşkızak and Gölcük Naval Shipyards.
Coastal & Fast patrol (7)
Class	Boat	No.	Commissioned	Displacement	Type	Homeport	Note
MRTP class	TCG MRTP-20 Kaan	MRTP-20-1	N/A	N/A	Patrol boat	Gölcük	Used by SAT Commandos for fire support. Built by Yonca-Onuk Shipyard.
MRTP class	TCG MRTP-20 Kaan	MRTP-20-2	N/A	N/A	Patrol boat	Gölcük	Used by SAT Commandos for fire support. Built by Yonca-Onuk Shipyard.
MRTP class	TCG MRTP-22U/SOC	MRTP-22U-1	N/A	N/A	Patrol boat	Gölcük	Used by SAT Commandos for fire support. Built by Yonca-Onuk Shipyard.
MRTP class	TCG MRTP-22U/SOC	MRTP-22U-2	N/A	N/A	Patrol boat	Gölcük	Used by SAT Commandos for fire support. Built by Yonca-Onuk Shipyard.
MRTP class	TCG MRTP-22U/SOC	MRTP-22U-3	N/A	N/A	Patrol boat	Gölcük	Used by SAT Commandos for fire support. Built by Yonca-Onuk Shipyard.
MRTP class	TCG MRTP-24U/SOC	MRTP-24U-1	N/A	N/A	Patrol boat	Gölcük	Used by SAT Commandos for fire support. Built by Yonca-Onuk Shipyard.
MRTP class	TCG MRTP-24U/SOC	MRTP-24U-2	N/A	N/A	Patrol boat	Gölcük	Used by SAT Commandos for fire support. Built by Yonca-Onuk Shipyard.

=== Mine and Amphibious Warfare ===
Mine and Amphibious Warfare fleet
Mine countermeasures (11)
Class	Boat	No.	Commissioned	Displacement	Type	Homeport	Note
Engin class	TCG Edincik	M-260	1998	510 tonnes	Minehunter	Erdek	Ex-Circe class. TCG Edremit is used for test and training. ex Circe class
Engin class	TCG Edremit	M-261	1998	510 tonnes	Minehunter	Erdek	Ex-Circe class. TCG Edremit is used for test and training. ex Circe class
Engin class	TCG Enez	M-262	1998	510 tonnes	Minehunter	Erdek	Ex-Circe class. TCG Edremit is used for test and training. ex Circe class
Engin class	TCG Erdek	M-263	1998	510 tonnes	Minehunter	Erdek	Ex-Circe class. TCG Edremit is used for test and training. ex Circe class
Engin class	TCG Erdemli	M-264	1999	510 tonnes	Minehunter	Erdek	Ex-Circe class. TCG Edremit is used for test and training. ex Circe class
Aydın class	TCG Alanya	M-265	2005	657 tonnes	Minehunter	Erdek	A-class minehunters. TCG Alanya (M-260) built by Abeking & Rasmussen. The rest of the class were built by Istanbul Naval Shipyard.
Aydın class	TCG Amasra	M-266	2005	657 tonnes	Minehunter	Erdek	A-class minehunters. TCG Alanya (M-260) built by Abeking & Rasmussen. The rest of the class were built by Istanbul Naval Shipyard.
Aydın class	TCG Ayvalık	M-267	2007	657 tonnes	Minehunter	Erdek	A-class minehunters. TCG Alanya (M-260) built by Abeking & Rasmussen. The rest of the class were built by Istanbul Naval Shipyard.
Aydın class	TCG Akçakoca	M-268	2007	657 tonnes	Minehunter	Erdek	A-class minehunters. TCG Alanya (M-260) built by Abeking & Rasmussen. The rest of the class were built by Istanbul Naval Shipyard.
Aydın class	TCG Anamur	M-269	2008	657 tonnes	Minehunter	Erdek	A-class minehunters. TCG Alanya (M-260) built by Abeking & Rasmussen. The rest of the class were built by Istanbul Naval Shipyard.
Aydın class	TCG Akçay	M-270	2009	657 tonnes	Minehunter	Erdek	A-class minehunters. TCG Alanya (M-260) built by Abeking & Rasmussen. The rest of the class were built by Istanbul Naval Shipyard.
Landing ships tank (5)
Class	Boat	No.	Commissioned	Displacement	Type	Homeport	Note
Bey class	TCG Sarucabey	NL-123	1985	2,600 tonnes	LST	Foça	Built by Taşkızak Naval Shipyard.
Bey class	TCG Karamürselbey	NL-124	1986	2,600 tonnes	LST	Foça	Built by Taşkızak Naval Shipyard.
Osmangazi class	TCG Osmangazi	NL-125	1994	3,700 tonnes	LST	Foça	Modernized. Built by Taşkızak Naval Shipyard.
Bayraktar class	TCG Bayraktar	L-402	2017	7,370 tonnes	LST	Foça	World's largest Tank Landing Ship. Two more planned. Built by Anadolu Shipyard.
Bayraktar class	TCG Sancaktar	L-403	2018	7,370 tonnes	LST	Foça	World's largest Tank Landing Ship. Two more planned. Built by Anadolu Shipyard.
Landing craft tank (21 active) + (8 on order)
Class	Boat	No.	Commissioned	Displacement	Type	Homeport	Note
130 class	TCG Ç-132	Ç-132	1980	600 tonnes	LCT	Foça	ex-Engin de débarquement d'infanterie et de chars. Ç-130 and Ç-131 were donated to Libya.
130 class	TCG Ç-138	Ç-138	1981	600 tonnes	LCT	Foça	ex-Engin de débarquement d'infanterie et de chars. Ç-130 and Ç-131 were donated to Libya.
140 class	TCG Ç-140	Ç-140	N/A	1,300 tonnes	LCT	Foça	
140 class	TCG Ç-141	Ç-141	N/A	1,300 tonnes	LCT	Foça	
140 class	TCG Ç-142	Ç-142	N/A	1,300 tonnes	LCT	Foça	
140 class	TCG Ç-143	Ç-143	N/A	1,300 tonnes	LCT	Foça	
140 class	TCG Ç-144	Ç-144	N/A	1,300 tonnes	LCT	Foça	
140 class	TCG Ç-145	Ç-145	N/A	1,300 tonnes	LCT	Foça	
140 class	TCG Ç-146	Ç-146	N/A	1,300 tonnes	LCT	Foça	
140 class	TCG Ç-147	Ç-147	N/A	1,300 tonnes	LCT	Foça	
140 class	TCG Ç-148	Ç-148	N/A	1,300 tonnes	LCT	Foça	
140 class	TCG Ç-149	Ç-149	N/A	1,300 tonnes	LCT	Foça	
140 class	TCG Ç-150	Ç-150	N/A	1,300 tonnes	LCT	Foça	
151 class	TCG Ç-151	Ç-151	2013	1,156 tonnes	LCT	Foça	Built by Anadolu Shipyard.
151 class	TCG Ç-152	Ç-152	2013	1,156 tonnes	LCT	Foça	Built by Anadolu Shipyard.
151 class	TCG Ç-153	Ç-153	2013	1,156 tonnes	LCT	Foça	Built by Anadolu Shipyard.
151 class	TCG Ç-154	Ç-154	2013	1,156 tonnes	LCT	Foça	Built by Anadolu Shipyard.
151 class	TCG Ç-155	Ç-155	2013	1,156 tonnes	LCT	Foça	Built by Anadolu Shipyard.
151 class	TCG Ç-156	Ç-156	2013	1,156 tonnes	LCT	Foça	Built by Anadolu Shipyard.
151 class	TCG Ç-157	Ç-157	2013	1,156 tonnes	LCT	Foça	Built by Anadolu Shipyard.
151 class	TCG Ç-158	Ç-158	2013	1,156 tonnes	LCT	Foça	Built by Anadolu Shipyard.
159 class	TCG Ç-159	Ç-159		1,156 tonnes	LCT	Foça	The first ship (TCG Ç-159) entered service. 7 more are being built by Anadolu shipyard. The last ship is expected to be delivered in 2027.
159 class	TCG Ç-160	Ç-160		1,156 tonnes	LCT	Foça	The first ship (TCG Ç-159) entered service. 7 more are being built by Anadolu shipyard. The last ship is expected to be delivered in 2027.
159 class	TCG Ç-161	Ç-161		1,156 tonnes	LCT	Foça	The first ship (TCG Ç-159) entered service. 7 more are being built by Anadolu shipyard. The last ship is expected to be delivered in 2027.
159 class	TCG Ç-162	Ç-162		1,156 tonnes	LCT	Foça	The first ship (TCG Ç-159) entered service. 7 more are being built by Anadolu shipyard. The last ship is expected to be delivered in 2027.
159 class	TCG Ç-163	Ç-163		1,156 tonnes	LCT	Foça	The first ship (TCG Ç-159) entered service. 7 more are being built by Anadolu shipyard. The last ship is expected to be delivered in 2027.
159 class	TCG Ç-164	Ç-164		1,156 tonnes	LCT	Foça	The first ship (TCG Ç-159) entered service. 7 more are being built by Anadolu shipyard. The last ship is expected to be delivered in 2027.
159 class	TCG Ç-165	Ç-165		1,156 tonnes	LCT	Foça	The first ship (TCG Ç-159) entered service. 7 more are being built by Anadolu shipyard. The last ship is expected to be delivered in 2027.
159 class	TCG Ç-166	Ç-166		1,156 tonnes	LCT	Foça	The first ship (TCG Ç-159) entered service. 7 more are being built by Anadolu shipyard. The last ship is expected to be delivered in 2027.
Landing craft mechanized (6)
Class	Boat	No.	Commissioned	Displacement	Type	Homeport	Note
301 class	TCG Ç-321	Ç-321	N/A	113 tonnes	LCM	Foça	ex LCM-8-class Crafts from Ç-301 to 331 are known to be extant. Ç-326 and Ç-327 renamed as KKTCSG-301 & KKTCSG-303 are used by TRNC.}}
301 class	TCG Ç-322	Ç-322	N/A	113 tonnes	LCM	Foça	ex LCM-8-class Crafts from Ç-301 to 331 are known to be extant. Ç-326 and Ç-327 renamed as KKTCSG-301 & KKTCSG-303 are used by TRNC.}}
301 class	TCG Ç-324	Ç-324	N/A	113 tonnes	LCM	Foça	ex LCM-8-class Crafts from Ç-301 to 331 are known to be extant. Ç-326 and Ç-327 renamed as KKTCSG-301 & KKTCSG-303 are used by TRNC.}}
301 class	TCG Ç-329	Ç-329	N/A	113 tonnes	LCM	Foça	ex LCM-8-class Crafts from Ç-301 to 331 are known to be extant. Ç-326 and Ç-327 renamed as KKTCSG-301 & KKTCSG-303 are used by TRNC.}}
301 class	TCG Ç-330	Ç-330	N/A	113 tonnes	LCM	Foça	ex LCM-8-class Crafts from Ç-301 to 331 are known to be extant. Ç-326 and Ç-327 renamed as KKTCSG-301 & KKTCSG-303 are used by TRNC.}}
301 class	TCG Ç-331	Ç-331	N/A	113 tonnes	LCM	Foça	ex LCM-8-class Crafts from Ç-301 to 331 are known to be extant. Ç-326 and Ç-327 renamed as KKTCSG-301 & KKTCSG-303 are used by TRNC.}}
Landing craft vehicle personnel (18)
Class	Boat	No.	Commissioned	Displacement	Type	Homeport	Note
Anadolu class	TCG L400-1	L400-1	N/A	25 tonnes	LCVP	Foça	
Anadolu class	TCG L400-2	L400-2	N/A	25 tonnes	LCVP	Foça	
Bayraktar class	TCG L402-1	L402-1	N/A	25 tonnes	LCVP	Foça	
Bayraktar class	TCG L402-2	L402-2	N/A	25 tonnes	LCVP	Foça	
Bayraktar class	TCG L402-3	L402-3	N/A	25 tonnes	LCVP	Foça	
Bayraktar class	TCG L402-4	L402-4	N/A	25 tonnes	LCVP	Foça	
Bayraktar class	TCG L403-1	L403-1	N/A	25 tonnes	LCVP	Foça	
Bayraktar class	TCG L403-2	L403-2	N/A	25 tonnes	LCVP	Foça	
Bayraktar class	TCG L403-3	L403-3	N/A	25 tonnes	LCVP	Foça	
Bayraktar class	TCG L403-4	L403-4	N/A	25 tonnes	LCVP	Foça	
Bey class	TCG NL123-1	NL123-1	N/A	25 tonnes	LCVP	Foça	
Bey class	TCG NL123-2	NL123-2	N/A	25 tonnes	LCVP	Foça	
Bey class	TCG NL124-1	NL124-1	N/A	25 tonnes	LCVP	Foça	
Bey class	TCG NL124-2	NL124-2	N/A	25 tonnes	LCVP	Foça	
Osman Gazi class	TCG NL125-1	NL125-1	N/A	25 tonnes	LCVP	Foça	
Osman Gazi class	TCG NL125-2	NL125-2	N/A	25 tonnes	LCVP	Foça	
Osman Gazi class	TCG NL125-3	NL125-3	N/A	25 tonnes	LCVP	Foça	
Osman Gazi class	TCG NL125-4	NL125-4	N/A	25 tonnes	LCVP	Foça	

== Auxiliary fleet ==
Auxiliary fleet
Supply and combat support (1)
Class	Boat	Pennant No.	Commissioned	Displacement	Type	Homeport	Note
Derya class	TCG Derya	A-1590	2024	26,000 tonnes	Auxiliary ship	Gölcük	Built by Sefine Shipyard.
Replenishment oiler (4)
Class	Boat	No.	Commissioned	Displacement	Type	Homeport	Note
Akar class	TCG Akar	A-580	1987	19,350 tonnes	Replenishment tanker	Gölcük	A-580 was built by the Gölcük Naval Shipyard and A-585 was built by Sedef Shipyard.
Akar class	TCG Yarbay Kudret Güngör	A-585	1995	19,350 tonnes	Replenishment tanker	Gölcük	A-580 was built by the Gölcük Naval Shipyard and A-585 was built by Sedef Shipyard.
Yüzbaşı Güngör Durmuş class	TCG Yüzbaşı Güngör Durmuş	A-574	2021	8,477 tonnes	Replenishment tanker	Gölcük	Construction was started by Selah Shipyard and completed by Ada Shipyard.
Yüzbaşı Güngör Durmuş class	TCG Üsteğmen Arif Ekmekçi	A-575	2024	8,477 tonnes	Replenishment tanker	Gölcük	Construction was started by Selah Shipyard and completed by Ada Shipyard.
Troopships (1)
Class	Boat	No.	Commissioned	Displacement	Type	Homeport	Note
İskenderun class	TCG İskenderun	A-1600	2022	7,948 tonnes	Troopship	Gölcük	Built by the Gölcük Naval Shipyard.
Training ships (1)
Class	Boat	No.	Commissioned	Displacement	Type	Homeport	Note
MV Savarona class	TCG MV Savarona	A-490	2024	4,646 tonnes	Training ship	Gölcük	Received comprehensive repairs in the Istanbul Naval Shipyard.
Submarine rescue ship (1)
Class	Boat	No.	Commissioned	Displacement	Type	Homeport	Note
Alemdar class	TCG Alemdar	A-582	2017	4,500 tonnes	Submarine rescue ship	Gölcük	Built by the Istanbul Naval Shipyard.
Tankers (5 active) + (1 on order)
Class	Boat	No.	Commissioned	Displacement	Type	Homeport	Note
Albay Hakkı Burak class	TCG Albay Hakkı Burak	A-571	2000	3,200 tonnes	Oil tanker	Gölcük	Built by RMK Marine.
Albay Hakkı Burak class	TCG Yzb. İhsan Tulunay	A-572	2000	3,200 tonnes	Oil tanker	Gölcük	Built by RMK Marine.
Yakıt class	TCG Yakıt-1	Y-160	2024	N/A	Oil tanker	Gölcük	Built by the Gölcük Naval Shipyard.
Yakıt class	TCG Yakıt-2	Y-161	2024	N/A	Oil tanker	Gölcük	Built by the Gölcük Naval Shipyard.
Yakıt class	TCG Yakıt-3	Y-162	2024	N/A	Oil tanker	Gölcük	Built by the Gölcük Naval Shipyard.
Yakıt class	TCG Yakıt-4	Y-163		N/A	Oil tanker	Gölcük	Built by the Gölcük Naval Shipyard.
Survey (2)
Class	Boat	No.	Commissioned	Displacement	Type	Homeport	Note
Çubuklu class	TCG Çubuklu	A-594	1986	643 tonnes	Oceanographic survey	Gölcük	
Çeşme class	TCG Çeşme	A-579	2000	2,550 tonnes	Oceanographic survey	Gölcük	
Intelligence ship (1)
Class	Boat	No.	Commissioned	Displacement	Type	Homeport	Note
Ufuk class	TCG Ufuk	A-591	2022	2,400 tonnes	Spy ship	Gölcük	Stripped MILGEM.}} Also used for test and training.
Rescue and salvage (2)
Class	Boat	No.	Commissioned	Displacement	Type	Homeport	Note
Işın class	TCG Işın	A-583	2017	2,400 tonnes	Rescue and salvage ship	Gölcük	Built by the Istanbul Naval Shipyard.
Işın class	TCG Akın	A-584	2017	2,400 tonnes	Rescue and salvage ship	Gölcük	Built by the Istanbul Naval Shipyard.
Tugboats (10)
Class	Boat	No.	Commissioned	Displacement	Type	Homeport	Note
Akbaş class	TCG Akbaş	A-586	N/A	1,682 tonnes	Tugboat	Gölcük	ex-Almaz class
Darıca class	TCG Darıca	A-578	1991	750 tonnes	Tugboat	Gölcük	
Önder class	TCG Önder	A-1540	1999	420 tonnes	Tugboat	Gölcük	
Önder class	TCG Öncü	A-584	1999	420 tonnes	Tugboat	Gölcük	
Önder class	TCG Özgev	A-584	1999	420 tonnes	Tugboat	Gölcük	
Önder class	TCG Ödev	A-584	1999	420 tonnes	Tugboat	Gölcük	
Önder class	TCG Özgü	A-584	2000	420 tonnes	Tugboat	Gölcük	
İnebolu class	TCG İnebolu	A-590	2008	2,260 tonnes	Tugboat	Gölcük	ex United States Navy ship USNS Powhatan
KızıIırmak class	TCG KızıIırmak	A-1560	2021	1,235 tonnes	Tugboat	Gölcük	
KızıIırmak class	TCG Yeşilırmak	A-1561	2021	1,235 tonnes	Tugboat	Gölcük	
Net laying ships (2)
Class	Boat	No.	Commissioned	Displacement	Type	Homeport	Note
AĞ class	TCG AĞ-5	A-1580	1970	960 tonnes	Net laying ship	Gölcük	ex-HNLMS Cerberus
AĞ class	TCG AĞ-6	A-1581	1970	960 tonnes	Net laying ship	Gölcük	ex-HNLMS Cerberus
Emergency response and diving training boats (2)
Class	Boat	No.	Commissioned	Displacement	Type	Homeport	Note
Dalgıç class	TCG Dalgıç-1	Y-15	2020	260 tonnes	Diving support vessel	Gölcük	
Dalgıç class	TCG Dalgıç-2	Y-16	2020	260 tonnes	Diving support vessel	Gölcük	
Training ships (8)
Class	Boat	No.	Commissioned	Displacement	Type	Homeport	Note
E class	TCG E-1	A-1531	2000	97 tonnes	Training ship	Gölcük	
E class	TCG E-2	A-1532	2000	97 tonnes	Training ship	Gölcük	
E class	TCG E-3	A-1533	2000	97 tonnes	Training ship	Gölcük	
E class	TCG E-4	A-1534	2000	97 tonnes	Training ship	Gölcük	
E class	TCG E-5	A-1535	2000	97 tonnes	Training ship	Gölcük	
E class	TCG E-6	A-1536	2000	97 tonnes	Training ship	Gölcük	
E class	TCG E-7	A-1537	2000	97 tonnes	Training ship	Gölcük	
E class	TCG E-8	A-1538	2000	97 tonnes	Training ship	Gölcük	
Fast transport ships (3)
Merih class	TCG Mersin TCG Muğla TCG GaziMağusa	Y-110 Y-111 Y-112	2024 2024 2024	395 tonnes	Sea bus	Gölcük	

== Unmanned Surface Vessels ==
The number of active USVs in the Turkish Naval Forces is classified.

Unmanned Surface Vessels
Training USV (2)
Class	Boat	Commissioned	Displacement	Type	Note
Albatros-K class	TCB Albatros-K	N/A	3-5 tonnes	Target boat	Albatros-K (5 m) boats with a 5 m x 11 m plate can be used autonomously, semi-autonomously or by remote command. and Albatros-T (5 m), which is produced in V-form with a radar reflector on it.
Albatros-T class	TCB Albatros-T	N/A	950 kilograms	Target boat	Albatros-K (5 m) boats with a 5 m x 11 m plate can be used autonomously, semi-autonomously or by remote command. and Albatros-T (5 m), which is produced in V-form with a radar reflector on it.
Attack/Reconnaissance USVs (8)
Class	Boat	Commissioned	Displacement	Type	Note
Marlin class	TCB Marlin SİDA- TCB-1101	2024	21 tonnes	Armed EW USV	Albatros-K (5 m) boats with a 5 m x 11 m plate can be used autonomously, semi-autonomously or by remote command. and Albatros-T (5 m), which is produced in V-form with a radar reflector on it.
Albatros-S class	TCB Albatros-S	2024	N/A	Armed Swarm USV	
Albatros Kamikaze class	TCB Albatros-Kamikaze	2024	N/A	Kamikaze USV	
Sancar class	TCB Sancar	2024	9 tonnes	Armed USV	
Salvo class	TCB Salvo SİDA- TCB-1401		N/A	Armed USV	
ULAQ class				Armed USV	
TUFAN class	TCB TUFAN	2025	N/A	Armed Missile USV	12 planned.
YAKTU class	TCB YAKTU	2025	N/A	Kamikaze USV	24 planned.
ÇAKA class	TCB ÇAKA	2025	N/A	Electronic Warfare USV	8 planned.

== Future procurement ==
Vessels
Project name	Type	Country/origin	Notes
National Aircraft carrier (MUGEM)	Aircraft carrier	Turkey	It is planned an aircraft carrier larger than the drone-carrying amphibious assault ship TCG ANADOLU and is expected to be 300 meters in length, 72 meters in width, with >60000 tons of displacement STOBAR type carrier. Construction of the carrier started.
TCG Trakya - L401	Drone carrier-Amphibious assault ship	Turkey	TCG Trakya (L-401) is a planned amphibious assault ship (LHD) of the Turkish Navy and the proposed sister ship of TCG Anadolu. She would be the second vessel of the Anadolu-class.
Tepe-class destroyer	Guided-missile Destroyer	Turkey	Under development. 8 are planned to be constructed. The vessel will be equipped with Turkish indigenous anti-ship missile Atmaca and other locally developed equipment. It is primarily designed as an air-defense-warfare vessel for the Turkish Navy. Construction of the first ship started.
Istanbul-class frigate	Multirole frigate	Turkey	The 9th, 10th, 11th and 12th ships to be built within the scope of the third phase of the MİLGEM project are planned to be the istif class frigates.
Atılay-class submarine	Conventional Attack Submarine	Turkey	MILDEN project designed as a diesel-electric submarines with a displacement of about 2,700 tons and a length of over 80 meters, and is powered by an air-independent propulsion system. Compared to the Turkish navy's current German designed submarines, MILDEN submarines will stay submerged longer, have a heavier weapons load and be able to operate at greater depths. Construction of the first submarine started. It would future MIDLAS VLS with Atmaca anti-ship missile with also UM extended land attack variant, Gezgin cruise missile and possible Tayfun ballistic missile(SLBM).
NUKDEN	Ballistic missile submarine	Turkey	As part of NUKDEN(National nuclear submarine) project is planned to build nuclear submarines.
Hisar class	Offshore Patrol Ships	Turkey	The first ship is expected to be commissioned in 2025. Totally 10 ships are planned. Dearsan will build four Hisar class OPVs after the first two ships by ASFAT.
Turkish Type FAC	Fast attack craft	Turkey	Getting developed by STM to meet needs of the Turkish Naval Forces and replace the older FACs. Totally 10 ships are planned
New generation Minehunter ships	Minehunter	Turkey	Decisions were taken for the construction of new types of landing ships and a new generation minehunter ship. It was signed an agreement between Türk Loydu and Anadolu Shipyard for eight new type landing crafts(LCT). Two Minehunter ships will be built by Dearsan which can be fitted with two USV. UUV loadout will consist of two shallow water UUVs, two multi-purpose UUVs, and single/multi-shot. The first new type Landing craft tank(LCT) Ç-159 is launched and is planned to be commissioned in 2025. Remaining ships are planned to be commissioned within 27 mounts.
New type Landing crafts	Landing craft	Turkey	
MIR	USV	Turkey	First time was shown with Albatros-S USV and undertook her first mission with Albatros . In development.
ULAQ	USV	Turkey	USV, which has a cruising range of 400 kilometers, a speed of 65 kilometers per hour, day/night vision capability, national encrypted communication infrastructure and produced from advanced composite materials; It can be used by land mobile vehicles, headquarters command center or floating platforms in the execution of missions such as Reconnaissance, Surveillance and Intelligence, Surface Warfare (SUH), Asymmetric Warfare, Armed Escort and Force Protection, Strategic Facility Security. In mass production. ULAQ USVs are being built by ARES Shipyard for the Turkish Navy.
Deringöz	UUV 24 will be delivered.	Turkey	

== Gallery ==
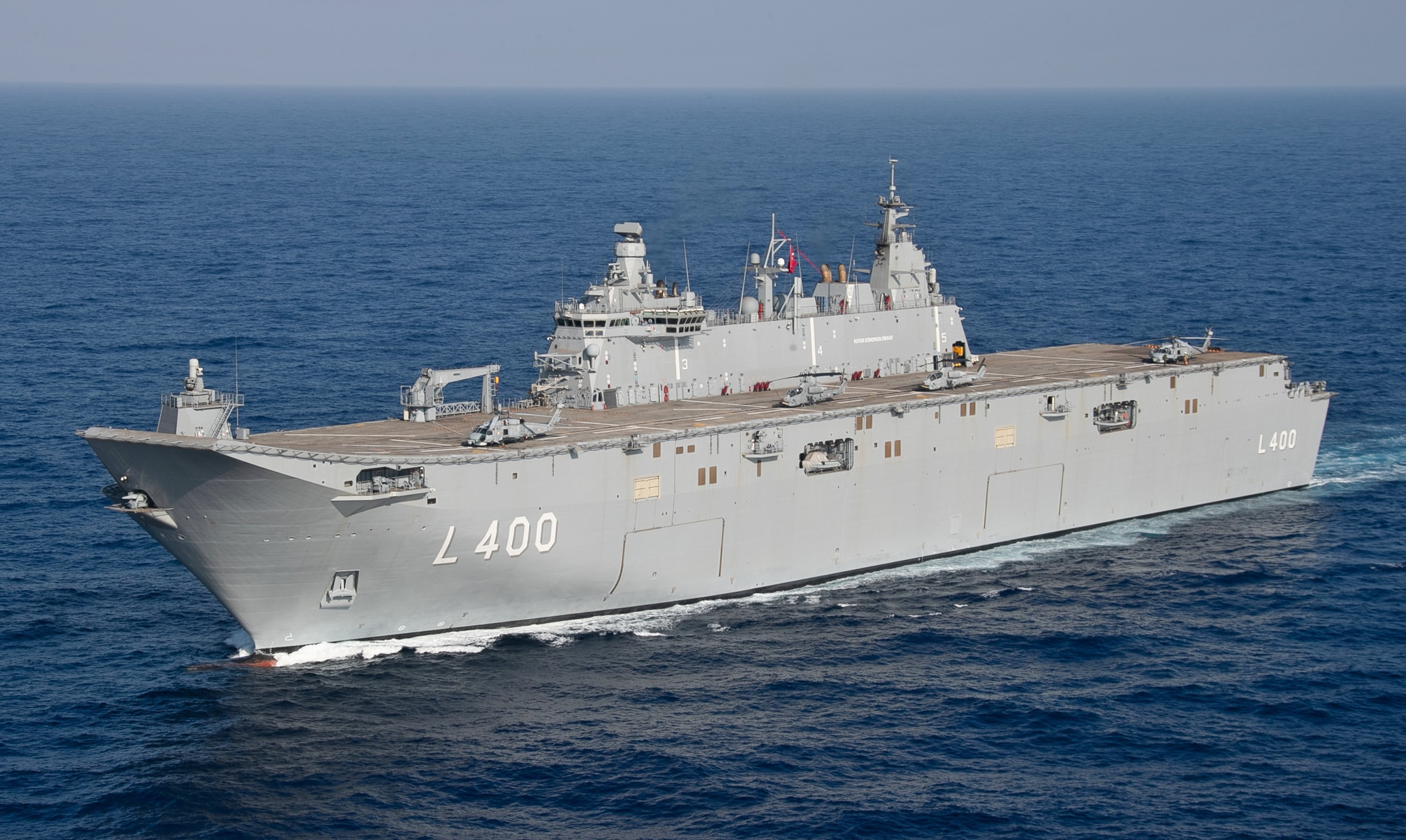
TCG Anadolu, flagship of the Turkish Naval Forces

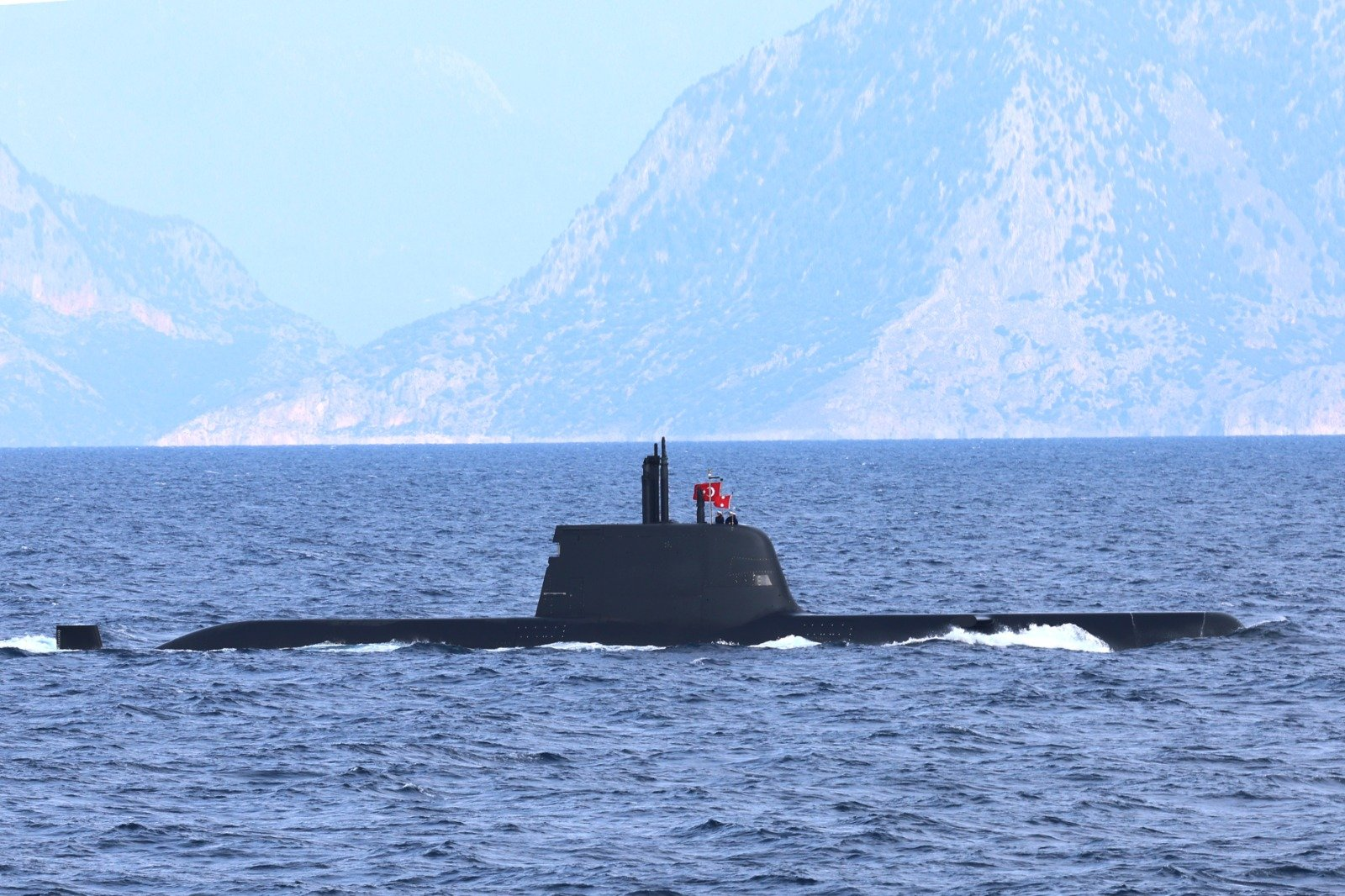
Piri Reis (Reis class)

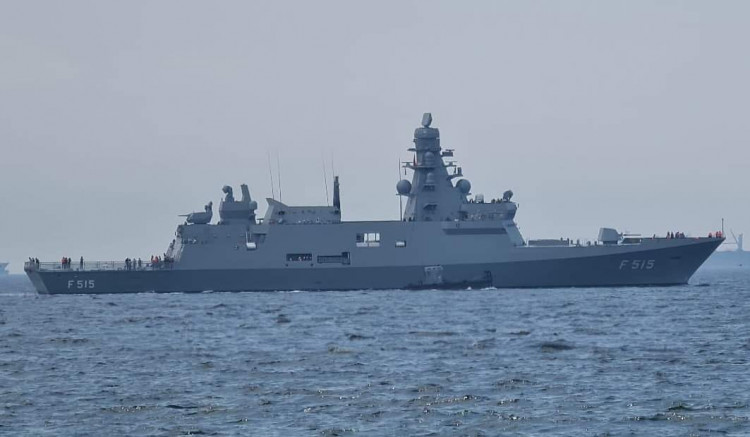
İstanbul (İstif class)

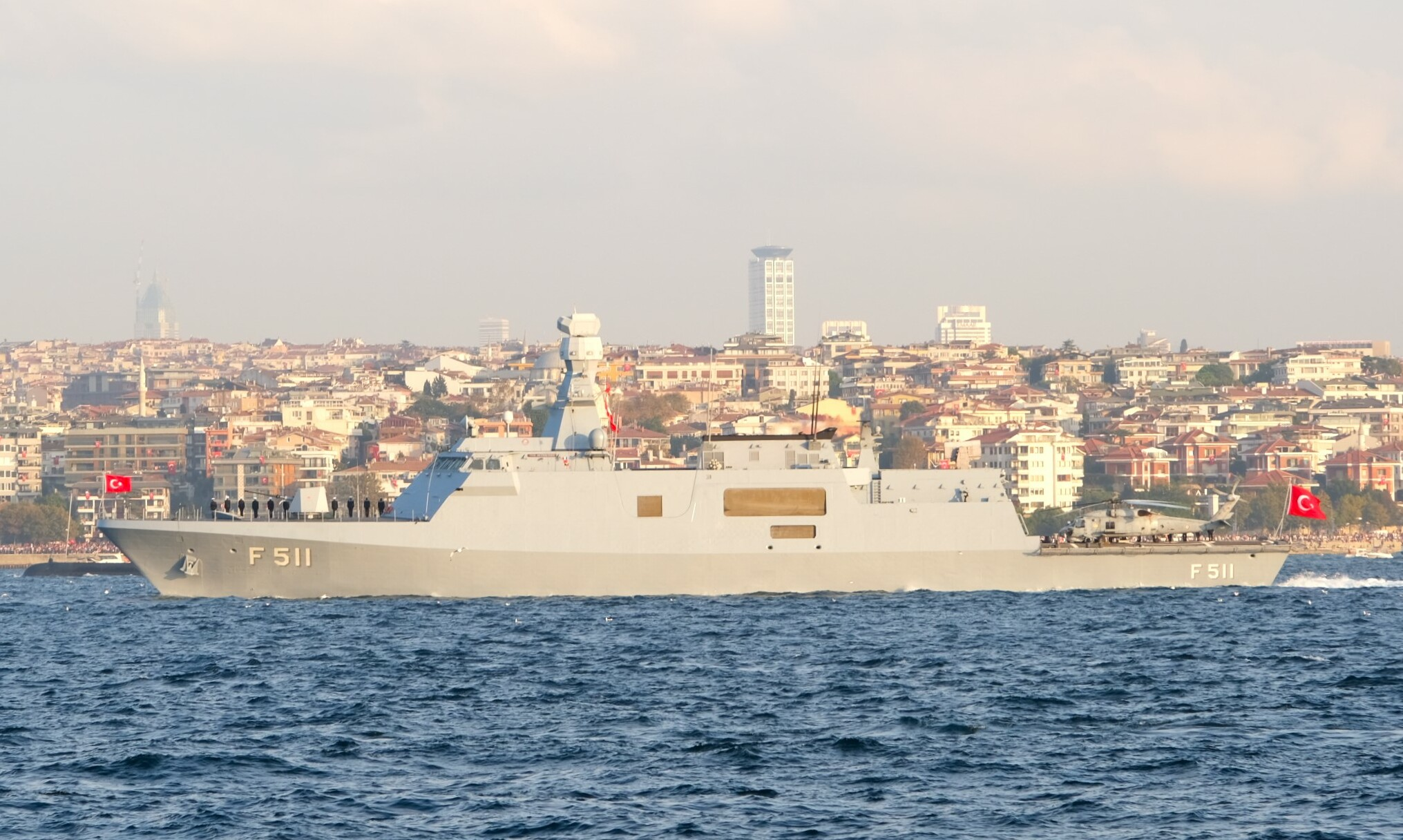
Heybeliada (Ada class)

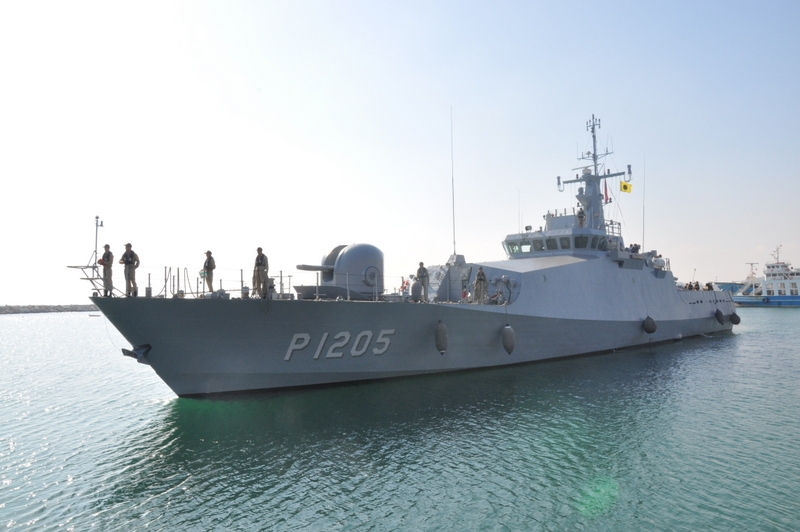
Karabiga (Tuzla class)

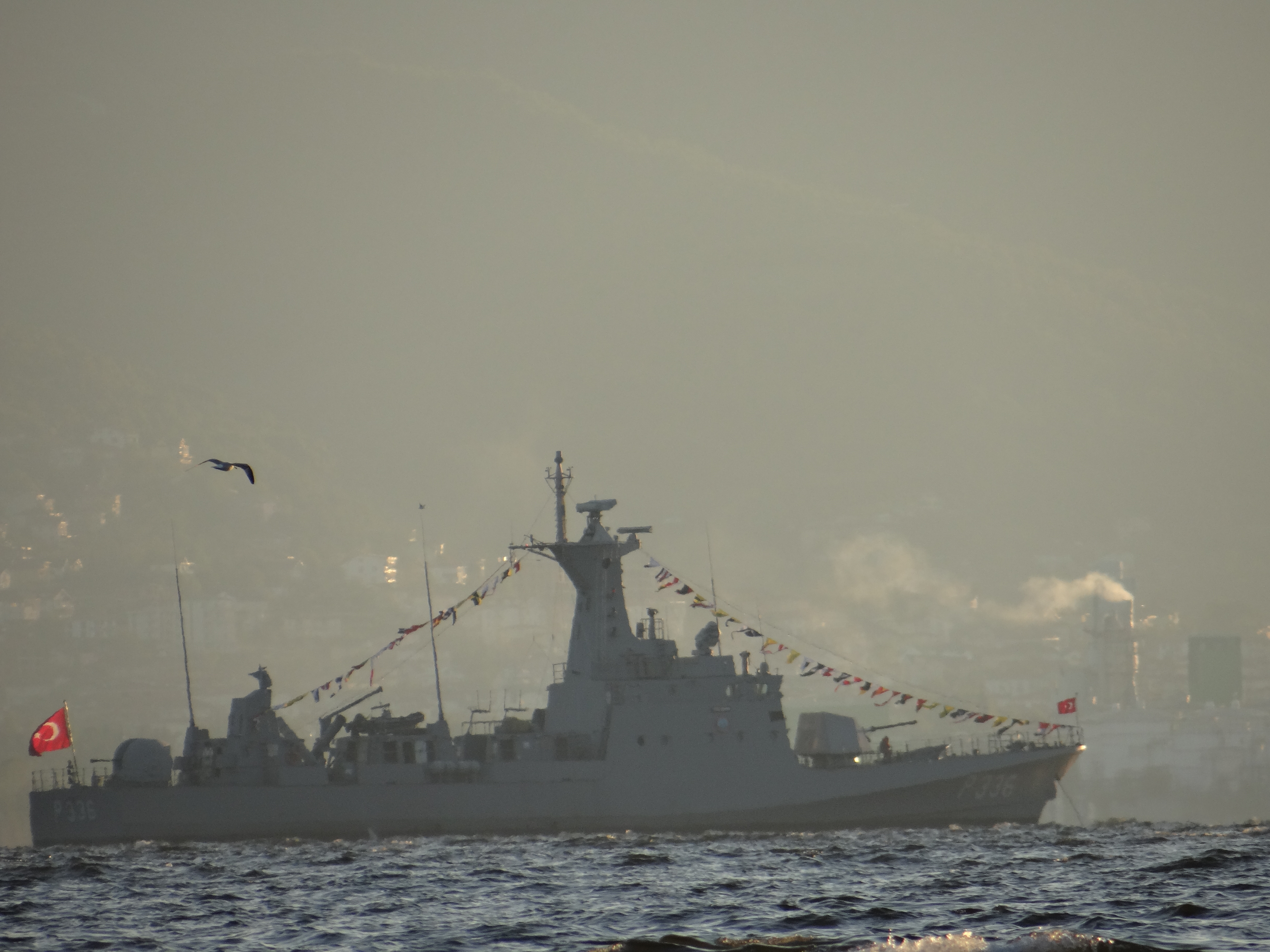
Zıpkın (Kılıç class)

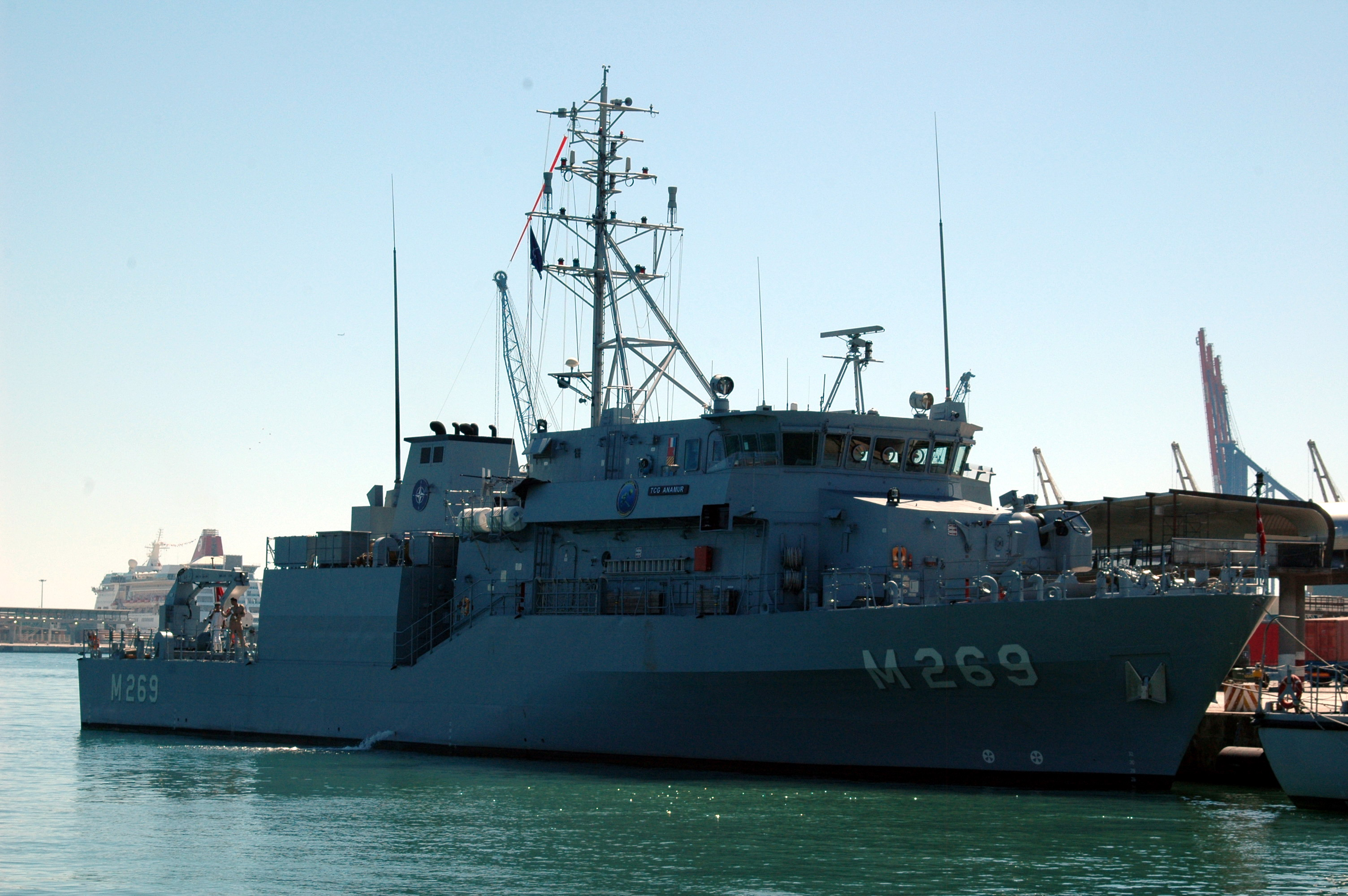
Anamur (Aydın class)

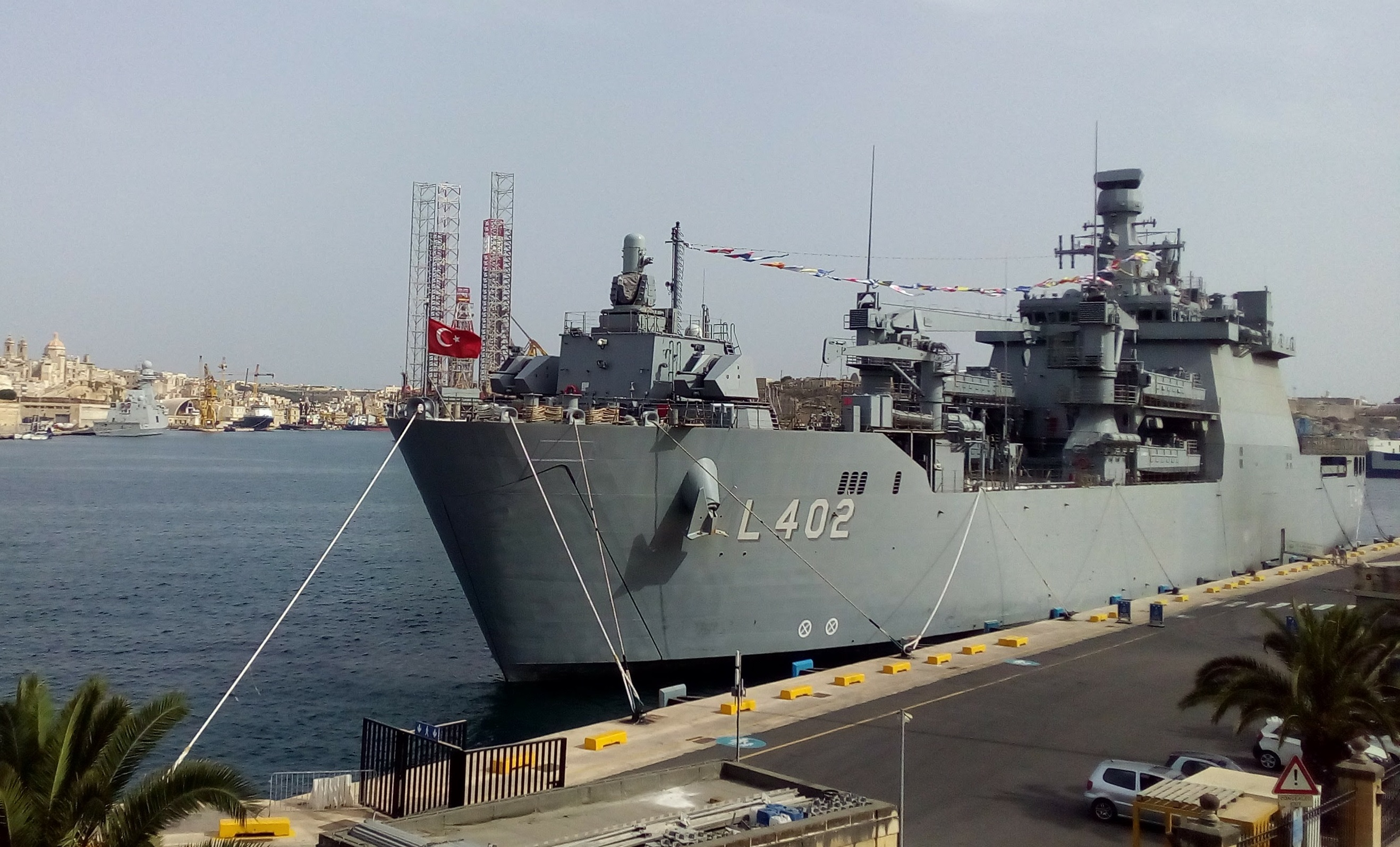
Bayraktar (Bayraktar class)

== See also ==
- Military equipment of Turkey
