= List of Turkish Naval Forces installations =

List of major active Turkish Naval Forces installations.

== Naval Bases ==
- Aksaz Naval Base
- Bartın Naval Base
- Erdek Naval Base
- Foça Naval Base
- Gölcük Naval Base
- Iskenderun Naval Base
- Pasha Liman Base
- Sürmene Naval Base

== Shipyards ==
- Gölcük Naval Shipyard
- Taşkızak Naval Shipyard
- Istanbul Naval Shipyard

== Air Bases ==
- Cengiz Topel Naval Air Station

== Schools ==
- Turkish Naval High School
- Turkish Naval Academy

== Museums ==
- Çanakkale Naval Museum
- İskenderun Naval Museum
- Istanbul Naval Museum
- İzmir Naval Museum
- Kocaeli Naval Museum
- Mersin Naval Museum
