= TCG Turgutreis =

TCG Turgutreis or Turgut Reis is the name of the following ships of the Turkish Navy:

- TCG Turgutreis (S 342), ex-USS Bergall, a Balao-class submarine acquired in 1958 and decommissioned in 1983
- TCG Turgutreis (F 241), a Yavuz-class frigate commissioned in 1988

== See also ==
- Ottoman battleship Turgut Reis, ex-SMS Weissenburg, acquired in 1910
- Turgutreis
- Turgut Reis
