= Fleet Command (Turkey) =

Subordinate command of the Turkish Naval Forces

Turkish Fleet Command
- The flag of Turkish Fleet Command
- Founded: 1961; 65 years ago
- Country: Turkey
- Branch: Turkish Naval Forces
- Type: Strike force command
- Part of: Northern Sea Area Command; Southern Sea Area Command; Naval Training and Education Command
- Garrison/HQ: Gölcük Naval Base, Turkey

Commanders
- Current commander: VADM Kadir Yıldız

The Turkish Fleet Command is one of the four and largest formations of the Turkish Naval Forces formed in 1961. It is a strike force of the Turkish Naval Force. Fleet Command operates War Fleet Command, Submarine Fleet Command, Mine Fleet Command and Naval Aviation Command. Turkey introduced three new task groups such as Northern, Southern and Western Commands in the Fleet Command in 2011 to ensure effective coordination and cooperation between the naval forces.

It also consists of landing units, with its headquarters at Gölcük Naval Base, covering the Black Sea. Its zonal commands are stationed in Eregli that covers Aegean Sea while its strait commands are headquartered at Istanbul and Çanakkale that covers Mediterranean Sea towards Mersin. As of 2016, Turkish Fleet Command is one of the strongest commands in the Black Sea.

== History ==
The Turkish Fleet Command was formed in 1961 after the country became a member of NATO on 18 February 1952. It coordinated with close allies of the NATO for establishing military relations. The Navy improved its organizational structure, military doctrine, and military capabilities for carrying all operations independently in accordance with Standardization Agreement.

On 4 April 1953, Turkish Naval Forces lost 81 submariners when submarine Dumlupınar II(D-6) met with an accident and collided with the Swedish Freighter Naboland. The loss of 81 submariners created disturbance in Turkey and an "emotional bridge between the Turkish Nation and the Turkish sailors" was created. The event was heavenly covered in Turkish songs and poems, and as a result, the Navy formed four main commands such as Fleet Command, Northern Sea Area Command, Southern Sea Area Command and Naval Training and Education Command in 1961 to improve its maritime service branch.

== See also ==
- List of active ships of the Turkish Naval Forces
- List of commanders of the Turkish Naval Forces
