= Tuzla-class patrol boat =

One of the patrol boat classes of the Turkish Navy

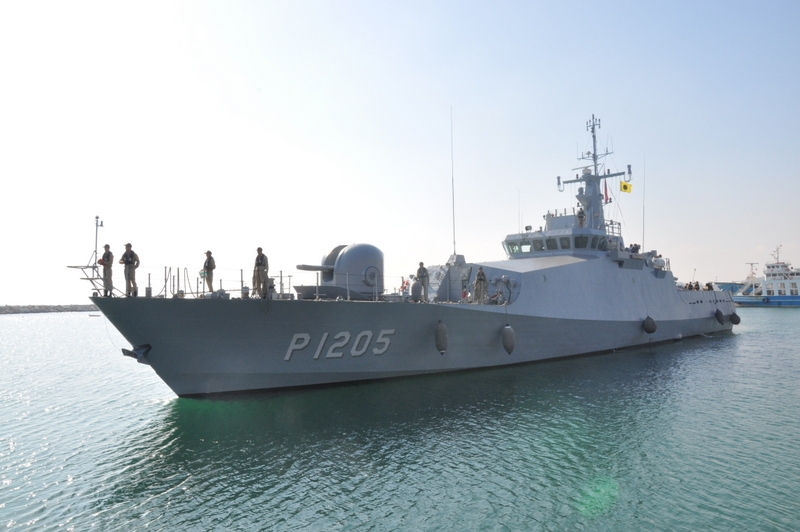
- TCG Karabiga (P-1205), one of the Tuzla-class patrol boats

Class overview
- Name: Tuzla class
- Builders: DEARSAN Gemi İnşaat Sanayi A.Ş (Dearsan Ship Construction Industry ltd.)
- Operators: Turkish Naval Forces; Turkmen Naval Forces
- Planned: 26 (16 for Turkish Navy, 10 for Turkmen Naval Forces).
- Completed: 26
- Active: 26

General characteristics
- Type: Patrol boat
- Displacement: 400 long tons (406 t) full load
- Length: 55.75 m (182 ft 11 in)
- Beam: 8.85 m (29 ft 0 in)
- Draught: 2.5 m (8 ft 2 in)
- Propulsion: 2 × MTU 250kw each diesel generators and engines, Otto Piening shaft and Propeller
- Speed: 25 knots (46 km/h; 29 mph)
- Range: 1,000 nmi (1,900 km) at 14 kn (26 km/h)
- Endurance: 1500 nmi
- Complement: 35 (15 officers, 20 privates)
- Sensors & processing systems: 25 kW X-Band Navigation Radar with ARPA/W(ECDIS) capability; Electro optical low-weight, multi-purpose, thermal imaging sensor; Optical Gyro compass with INS capability, Simrad SP92 Mk II hull-mounted low frequency Sonar
- Armament: 40 mm Oto Melara Twin compact gun, 2 × 12.7 mm Aselsan STAMP, Roketsan ASW rocket launcher, 2x4 Depth charges

The Tuzla-class New Type Patrol Boat (Turkish: Yeni Tip Karakol Botu) is one of the patrol boat classes of the Turkish Navy. The Tuzla class, named after a district in Istanbul with the same name, was designed by Dearsan Shipyards to meet the operational requirements of the Turkish Navy in littoral waters. These patrol boats conduct patrol, security and anti-submarine warfare (ASW) duties in or around harbors & coastal areas.

== Development ==
The contract signed between SSM and Dearsan on 23 August 2007 called for 16 New Type Patrol Boats to be constructed until 2015. Along with Dearsan, 204 domestic supplier firms are involved with the NTPB project as well as several foreign ones such as MTU or Oto Melara. The project is a first for the Turkish Navy and the Turkish military shipbuilding industry as there is a 67.5% domestic production percentage compared with 65% for the MILGEM.

As of February 2015, all 16 boats have been delivered to the Turkish Navy.

== Operators ==
- Turkey 16 operated by the Turkish Navy.
- Turkmenistan 10 delivered and operational as of 2015 to the Turkmenistan Navy. First and currently only foreign operator of the Tuzla-class patrol boat.

== Active ships ==
- TCG Tuzla (P-1200)
- TCG Karaburun (P-1201)
- TCG Köyceğiz (P-1202)
- TCG Kumkale (P-1203)
- TCG Tarsus (P-1204)
- TCG Karabiga (P-1205)
- TCG Karşıyaka (P-1206)
- TCG Tekirdağ (P-1207)
- TCG Kaş (P-1208)
- TCG Kilimli (P-1209)
- TCG Türkeli (P-1210)
- TCG Taşucu (P-1211)
- TCG Karataş (P-1212)
- TCG Karpaz (P-1213)
- TCG Kdz.Ereğli (P-1214)
- TCG Kuşadası (P-1215)

== See also ==
- List of major surface ships of the Turkish Navy
