= TCG İzmir =

TCG İzmir is the name of the following ships of the Turkish Navy:

- TCG İzmir (D 341), ex-USS Van Valkenburgh, a Fletcher-class destroyer acquired in 1967, scrapped in 1987
- TCG İzmir (F 516), an Istanbul-class frigate launched in 2025

== See also ==
- İzmir (disambiguation)
