= Anadolu Shipyard =

Shipyard in Tuzla, Istanbul

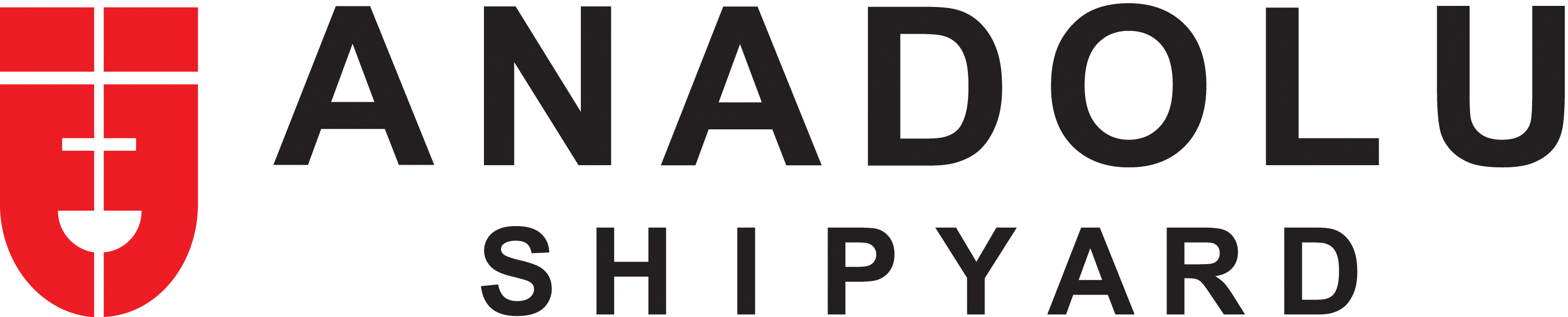
- Native name: Anadolu Deniz İnşaat Kızakları San. ve Tic. A.Ş. (ADİK)
- Company type: Shipyard
- Industry: Shipbuilding
- Founded: 1982; 44 years ago
- Headquarters: Tuzla, Istanbul, Turkey
- Area served: Worldwide
- Location of Anadolu Shipyard in Istanbul

Anadolu Shipyard (Turkish: Anadolu Deniz İnşaat Kızakları San. ve Tic. A.Ş.) (ADİK) is a Turkish shipyard located in Tuzla, Istanbul. The shipyard mostly builds amphibious warfare ships as part of the defense industry.

== History ==
Anadolu Shipyard was founded in the early 1950s. The company was initially active at Haliç Taşkızak in Golden Horn, Istanbul. In 1982, the shipyard moved to Tuzla, a district in the east of Istanbul.

By December 2004, the company had been taken over by Furtrans Shipping, which was about to construct a shipyard in Yalova. In 2005, Anadolu Shipyard and Sedef Shipyard established a joint venture with the TAIS Shipyards Company at Yalova with the purpose of building, repairing and maintaining naval ships of the Turkish Navy. The shipyard in Yalova has four shipways covering 450,000 m^{2} (4,800,000 sq ft) of the shipyard area.

== Overview ==
Anadolu Shipyard is situated on the Tersaneler Cad. 22 in Tuzla. In the beginning, the company built sailing yachts such as the 28 m (92 ft)-long Fortuna Blue in 1989, the 36 m (118 ft)-long Ofelia in 2000 and the 30 m (98 ft)-long Handem in 2002.

The shipyard has two shipways measuring 137.5 m × 25 m (451 ft × 82 ft) and 92.5 m × 20 m (303 ft × 66 ft). Ships can be built up to 158 m (518 ft) long and 17,000 DWT on one shipway, and of 107 m (351 ft) long and 7,350 DWT on the other shipway. There are two quays measuring 85 m × 8 m (279 ft × 26 ft) for ships up to 7,500 DWT and 95 m × 10 m (312 ft × 33 ft) for ships up to 20,000 DWT.

The shipyard is capable of building advanced amphibious warfare ships in lengths between 10 m (33 ft) and 165 m (541 ft). The production program covers small-sized Landing Craft Vehicle Personnels (LCVP), middle-size Landing Craft Mechanizeds (LCM), Landing Craft Tanks (LCT), Landing Ship, Tanks (LST) and Landing helicopter docks (LHD). Other ship designs include Offshore Patrol Vessels (OPV) of lengths 70–90 m (230–300 ft), Fast attack crafts (FAC) and Landing Platform Docks (LPD). The shipyard can simultaneously build up to six vessels.

The company employs between 25 and 30 retired Turkish Navy personnel, including retired admirals and captains.

== Ships for the Turkish Navy ==
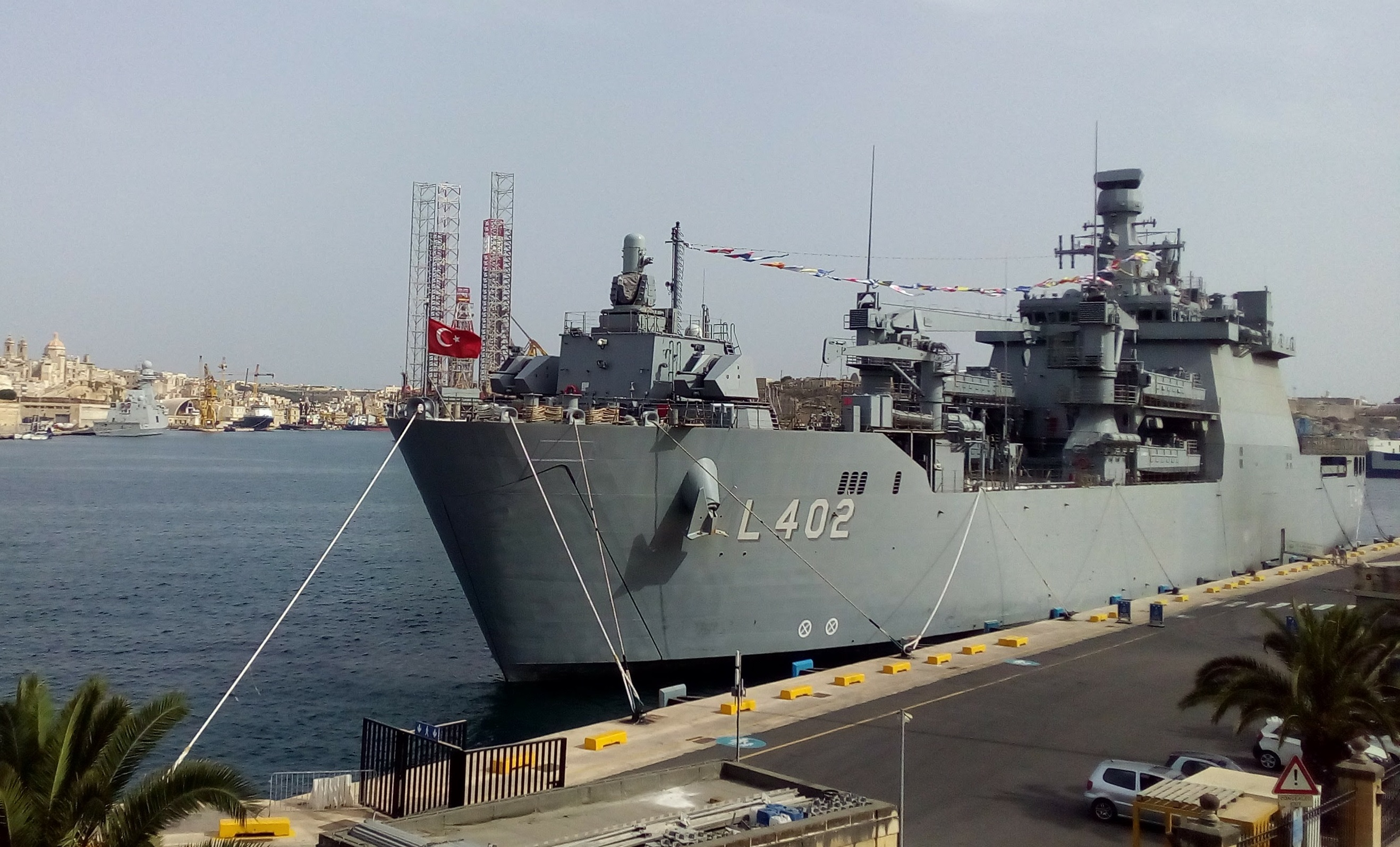
TCG Bayraktar (L-402) at Valletta Harbour, Malta in 2017.

In 2008, the company entered the defense industry with a project to build LCTs. Project planning for eight 80 m (260 ft)-long LCTs was accomplished in 2009 and the first ships were laid down in early 2010. All eight vessels were built and handed over to the Turkish Navy by 2012. These vessels are still the world's fastest in their class. In July 2012, the TCG Ç-153, a 150-class LST with 1,040 tons displacement set a speed record of 22 kn (41 km/h; 25 mph) during sea trials in Aegean Sea despite high seas.

The shipyard delivered the 138.75 m (455.2 ft)-long Bayraktar-class LSTs TCG Bayraktar (L-402) that was launched in 2015 and commissioned in 2017, and TCG Sancaktar (L-403) that was launched in 2016 and commissioned in 2018 to the Turkish Navy.

== Export ==
In October 2020, the 90 m (300 ft)-long Al Doha (QTS-91) of the Qatari Emiri Navy, the first of the two-armed Cadet Training Ships that were ordered in 2018, was launched. The first of two 40 m (130 ft)-long LCMs for the Qatari Emiri Navy was laid down in 2021.

== Technology transfer ==
In 2020, India's state-owned Hindustan Shipyard in Visakhapatnam signed a contract with Anadolu Shipyard for a technology transfer project despite concerns that emerged in India in 2019 that Indian-rival and Turkey-friendly Pakistan could prevent such a defense-industry-related business relationship. The project was valued at Rs 10,000 crore – between US$1.5 and 2.0 billion – and aims to build five HSL-class fleet support ships, each of 45,000 DWT, for the Indian Navy by the Indian shipyard. The technology transfer provides for the preparation of specifications, planning and engineering services.
