= Bayraktar-class tank landing ship =

Class of landing ship tanks (LSTs)

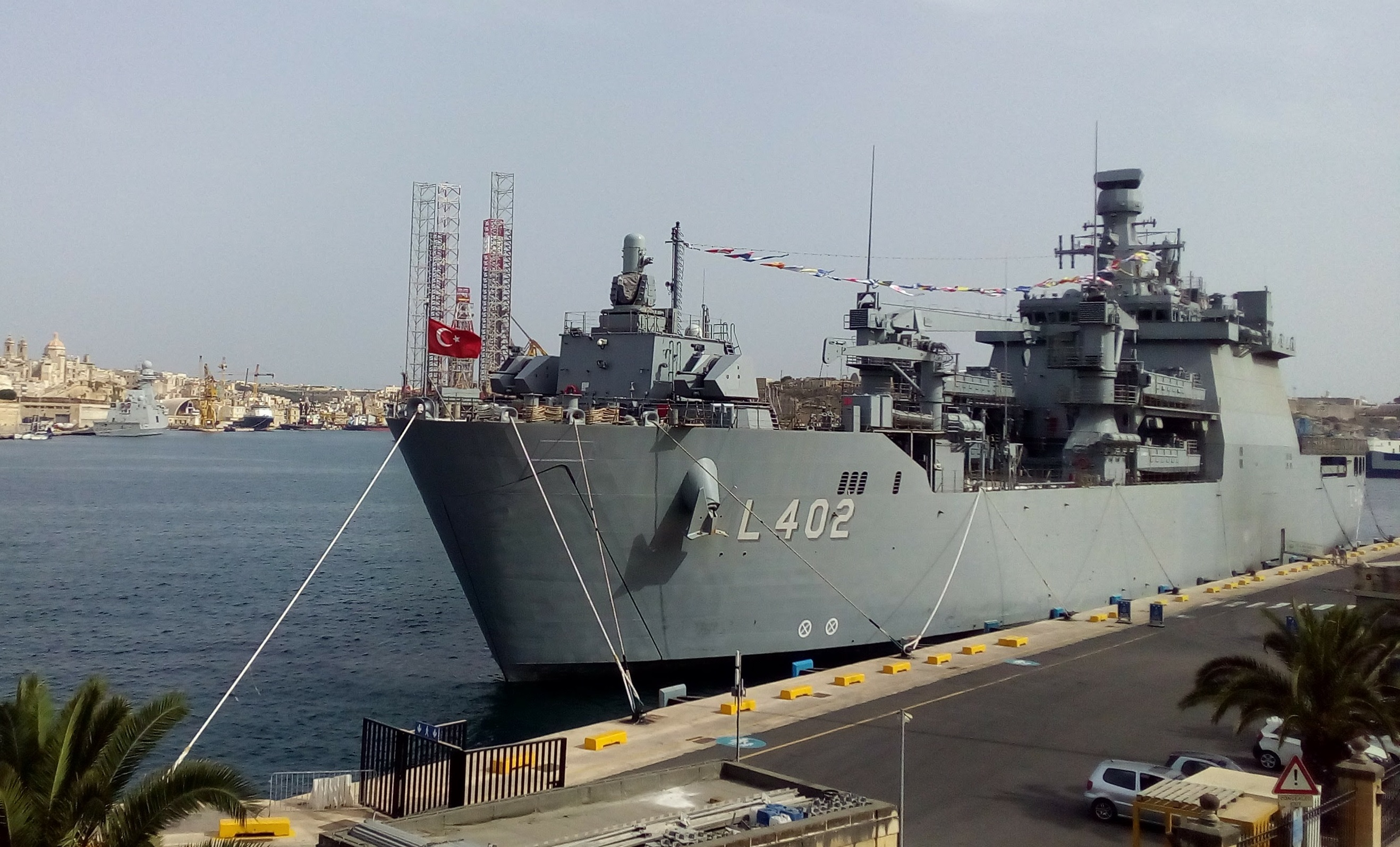
- TCG Bayraktar (L-402) in Valletta Harbour

Class overview
- Name: Bayraktar class
- Builders: Anadolu Shiphyards (ADIK)
- Operators: Turkish Navy
- Built: 2014–2018
- In commission: 2017-present
- Planned: 2 (+2)
- Completed: 2
- Active: 2

General characteristics
- Type: Landing ship tank
- Displacement: 7,254 long tons (7,370 t) full load
- Length: 138.75 m (455 ft 3 in)
- Beam: 19.60 m (64 ft 4 in)
- Draft: less than 2 metres (6 ft 7 in) forward and less than 5 metres (16 ft 5 in) aft when fully loaded.
- Propulsion: 4 x diesel engines, 3 x controllable-pitch propellers
- Speed: 18 knots (33 km/h; 21 mph)
- Range: 6,000 nmi (11,000 km; 6,900 mi) at 15 knots (28 km/h; 17 mph)
- Boats & landing craft carried: craft carried; 4 x landing craft, vehicle, personnel (LCVPs); 3 x self-propelled pontoons
- Capacity: 1,200 tons
- Troops: 486
- Complement: 176
- Sensors & processing systems: Radar: Thales Smart-S Mk2 air and surface surveillance radar, ASELSAN Alper, LPI X-Band naval radar, 2 x Sperry Marine VisionMaster FT S-band navigation radars
- Electronic warfare & decoys: Mark 36 SRBOC; 2 x Ultra Electronics Sea Sentor Surface Ship Torpedo Defence (SSTD) systems; ASELSAN Laser Warning Receiver (LIAS); Selex Silent Acquisition and Surveillance System (SASS); 2 x ASELSAN ASELFLIR-300D multisensor electro-optical Advanced Targeting Systems; Aselsan ARES-2N ECM suite
- Armament: 2 x bow mounted Leonardo's (former Oto Melara) Fast Forty 40 mm gun (single-barrel version); 2 x 20 mm Phalanx CIWS Block 1B Baseline 2 CIWS; 2 x ASELSAN STAMP 12.7 mm RCWS
- Aviation facilities: large landing spot for a heavy helicopter, no hangar

The Bayraktar class are a class of landing ship tanks (LSTs) built in Turkey. The two amphibious vessels of the class were built for the Turkish Navy by Anadolu Shipyard (Turkish: Anadolu Deniz Insaat Kizaklari Sanayi ve Ticaret- ADIK). The LSTs will satisfy the current and future operational requirements of the Turkish Naval Forces Command.

The LSTs are primarily intended for amphibious missions and transportation of troops and equipment, while their secondary missions include humanitarian aid, disaster relief, medical assistance and transportation.

== Project history ==
Anadolu Shipyard was awarded a contract to construct two LSTs for the Turkish Navy by Turkish SSM (Turkish Armament Authority) in June 2011. Under the agreement, the shipyard is responsible for their design, build, system integration, testing and delivery. Anadolu Shipyard and HAVELSAN signed a contract in 2012 for the integration of the combat management system (CMS) on the LST vessels. The second contract was signed by both companies for the LST project in March 2013.

Anadolu Shipyard signed supply contracts with Aselsan, Havelsan and ISBIR Elektrik for the LST project in May 2013. Aselsan was responsible for the delivery of the electronics and communications systems, while Havelsan was responsible for the CMS and GENESIS software for the vessels. ISBIR Elektrik provided the diesel generator sets for the LSTs.

In May 2014, the first steel was cut for the lead vessel in class, TCG Bayraktar (L-402). The LST was launched in October 2015 and was commissioned to the navy in 2017. The second LST, TCG Sancaktar was commissioned in April 2018.

== Design and features ==
The LSTs incorporate an upper-intermediate-sized monohull design made of steel. Each vessel is designed to meet the sea-keeping and stability requirements of the Turkish Navy, and will have an anticipated service life of 40 years. The ships comply with the IMO MARPOL 73/78 and Safety of Life at Sea (SOLAS) regulations.

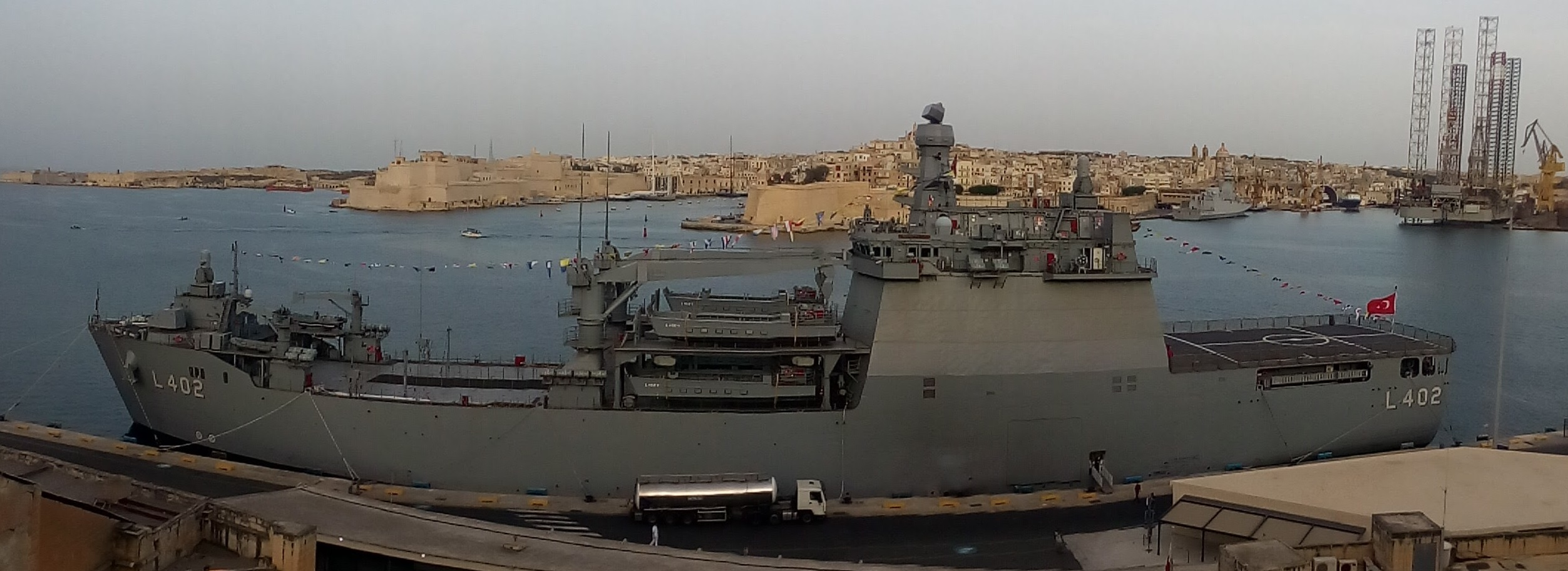
Port side view of TCG Bayraktar in Valletta Harbour

The fast amphibious vessels are equipped with significant armament and are capable of carrying large quantities of arms and ammunition, as well as marines in support of amphibious operations. TCG Bayraktar will also serve as a flagship and a logistic support vessel.

The ships of the class can operate in Sea State-5 conditions and can also be operated at Sea State-6 or higher, with limitations. Additionally the vessels will support limitless helicopter operations at Sea State-4 conditions.

Each vessel has an overall length of 138.75 metres (455 ft 3 in), a beam of 19.60 metres (64 ft 4 in) and a draught of less than 2 metres (6 ft 7 in) forward and less than 5 metres (16 ft 5 in) aft when fully loaded. The displacement of the vessel is 7,125 long tons (7,239 t) and the load carrying capacity is 1,180 long tons (1,200 t), including a mix of vehicles or cargo on open decks.

The LSTs have a ship's company of 12 officers, 51 petty officers and 66 ratings, as well as 17 officers and 350 marines from the Joint Group Headquarters.

=== Armament and sensors ===
The Turkish LSTs are armed with two OTO Melara 40 mm Fast Forty single naval gun mounts, two Mk 15 Phalanx close-in weapon systems (CIWS), and two machine guns on remotely controlled stabilised mounts. The amphibious ships feature a Smart Mk2 3D air/surface search radar, AselFLIR 300D EO director, torpedo countermeasures systems and a laser warning receiver. The sensors and weapons aboard the vessel will be controlled by Genesis CMS.

=== Propulsion of Turkish LSTs ===
The vessels are powered by four 2,880 kW (3,860 hp) main diesel engines, driving two controllable pitch propellers through twin shafts. The ships will also integrate a 500 kW (670 hp) bow thruster and four 785 kW (1,053 hp) diesel generators with a power management system (PMS). The propulsion system provides a maximum continuous speed of more than 18 knots (33 km/h; 21 mph) at full load displacement.

== Ships ==
Hull #	Ship	Builder	Commissioned	Status
L402	TCG Bayraktar	Anadolu Shipyard	14 April 2017	In active service (2018)
L403	TCG Sancaktar	Anadolu Shipyard	7 April 2018	In active service (2018)
L404	Unknown LST-HD Class		Proposed (2026)	
L405	Unknown LST-HD Class		Proposed (2026)	

== See also ==
Equivalent landing ships of the same era

- Ivan Gren class
- Cheon Wang Bong class
- Shardul class
- Type 072A (Batch 2)
