= TCG Ütğm Arif Ekmekçi =

Turkish Navy auxiliary ship

TCG Ütğm Arif Ekmekçi (A-575)
Class overview
- Name: Ütğm Arif Ekmekçi class
- Builders: Selah Shipyard, Ada Shipyard
- Operators: Turkish Navy
- Built: 2015–2024
- In commission: 2024–present
- Completed: 1
- Active: 1

History

Turkey
- Name: Ütğm Arif Ekmekçi
- Laid down: February 2015
- Launched: 7 July 2017
- Commissioned: 19 January 2024
- Identification: Hull number: A-575
- Status: In active service

General characteristics
- Type: Auxiliary ship
- Displacement: 8,477 long tons (8,613 t)
- Length: 106.51 m (349 ft 5 in)
- Beam: 16.80 m (55 ft 1 in)
- Range: 9,500 nmi (17,600 km; 10,900 mi) at 12 kn (22 km/h; 14 mph)
- Capacity: 4,036 long tons (4,101 t) F-76 diesel fuel, 336 long tons (341 t) JP-5 helicopter fuel, 631 long tons (641 t) drinking water, 8 standard containers
- Complement: 82
- Armament: 12.7 mm Aselsan STAMP
- Aircraft carried: 1 × Helicopter
- Aviation facilities: Helipad (15 t load capacity)

TCG Ütğm Arif Ekmekçi (A-575), also known as TCG Üsteğmen Arif Ekmekçi (A-575), is a Turkish auxiliary ship for fleet support of the Turkish Naval Forces, commissioned in January 2024. She was named after a naval special operations officer, who died during a military exercise at sea.

== History ==
On 17 July 2012, the Defence Industry Agency (SSB) of the Ministry of National Defense launched a project for the building of two auxiliary ships for fleet support to meet the needs of the Turkish Naval Forces.

=== Selah Shipyard ===
A contract was signed between the SSB and Selah Shipyard in Tuzla, Istanbul on 24 November 2014. After project begin in February 2015, it was planned that the first ship in 16 months, and the second ship in 26 months would be completed. The second ship, TCG Ütğm Arif Ekmekçi (A-575), was launched on 7 July 2017, and the outfitting activities began. In 2018, Selah Shipyard started to experience financial difficulties, and many workers were laid off without compensation. In September 2019, the shipbuilding company declared bankruptcy application to the court due to inability to make payments. The ships remained in the shipyard with their equipment, and sea trial activities were unfinished.

=== Ada Shipyard ===
On 9 February 2021, a contract was signed between the SSB and the defence engineering company STM to outfit the unfinished ships, and deliver them to the Turkish Navy as soon as possible. On 24 March 2021, works started at Ada Shipyard in Tuzla, Istanbul. Sea trials began on 7 July 2023. The ship entered service in the Turkish Navy with a ceremony on 19 January 2024. She was named TCG Ütğm Arif Ekmeçi after the naval special operations officer, who died during a naval exercise, and with the hull number A-575.

== Characteristics ==
The ship is 106.51 metres (349 ft 5 in) long, and has a beam of 16.80 m (55 ft 1 in). Her displacement tonnage is 8,477 long tons (8,613 t). She has a range of 9,500 nautical miles (17,600 km; 10,900 mi) at 12 knots (22 km/h; 14 mph). The ship is capable of carrying 4,036 long tons (4,101 t) of F-76 diesel fuel, 336 long tons (341 t) of JP-5 helicopter fuel, 631 long tons (641 t) of drinking water and 8 standard containers. The vessel features 108 m^{3} (3,800 cu ft) of storage space, an electro-hydraulic crane with 18 long tons (18 t) lifting capacity and a helipad of 15 long tons (15 t) load capacity. She is armed with two 12.7 mm Aselsan STAMP stabilized machine guns. The number of ship's crew is 82.

== Namesake ==
Arif Ekmekçi was born to Yılmaz and Kadun Ekmekçi in Tirebolu, Giresun Province, northern Turkey on 14 February 1964. He entered Naval High School at Heybeliada in Istanbul. After finishing his secondary education in 1982, he continued his military education in the Naval Academy at Tuzla, Istanbul, and graduated in 1986. He then took training at the Underwater Attack Commando (Turkish: SAT Komando) course, and became an underwater operation specialist officer in 1991. The next year, he married.

On 15 April 1993, Arif Ekmekçi, in the rank of a Lieutenant (junior grade), (Turkish: Üsteğmen), was tasked to simulate an escape from a submarine underwater together with a teammate during the naval exercise "Deniz Kurdu-93" ("Sea Wolf-93") off the coast of Amasra in the Black Sea. He and his teammate simultaneously exited the submarine, however, Ekmekçi could not get to the surface. Search and rescue efforts remained unsuccessful, only his diving fins were found.

In December 2007, diving suits containing human bone fragments were caught in the nets of fishermen fishing off the coast of Amasra. In case the body belonged to Arif Ekmekçi, a blood sample was taken from the mother, and a bone sample was taken from the body in the father's grave. After a ten-month DNA test process, it became clear that the body belonged to Arif Ekmekçi. In August 2008, his remains were buried in Edirnekapı Martyr's Cemetery in Istanbul.

== Sister ship ==
- TCG Yzb Güngör Durmuş (A-574)
