= Yavuz-class frigate =

Class of Turkish warships

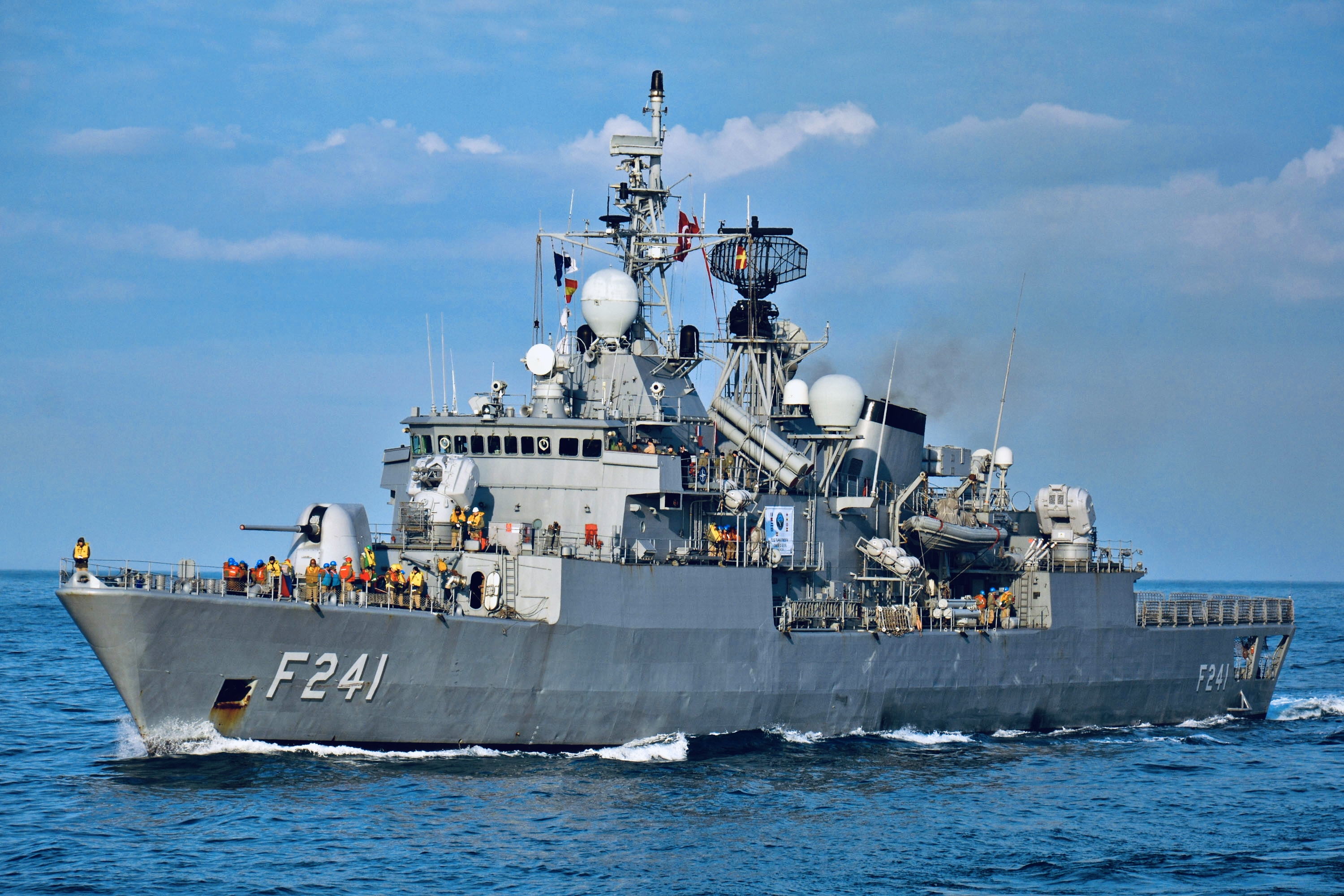
- TCG Turgutreis during NATO joint exercise in Adriatic Sea, 2015

Class overview
- Name: Yavuz class (MEKO 200 TN)
- Builders: Blohm + Voss, Howaldtswerke-Deutsche Werft, Gölcük Naval Shipyard
- Operators: Turkish Navy
- Preceded by: G class
- Succeeded by: Barbaros class
- In commission: 1987–present
- Completed: 4
- Active: 3
- Preserved: 1

General characteristics
- Type: Frigate
- Displacement: 3,030 tons full load
- Length: 110.50 m (362 ft 6 in)
- Beam: 13.25 m (43 ft 6 in)
- Draught: 3.94 m (12 ft 11 in)
- Installed power: 4 MTU 20V 1163 diesel-engines, 30,000 hp (22,000 kW) CODAD
- Propulsion: 2 shaft, controllable pitch propellers
- Speed: 27 knots (50 km/h; 31 mph)
- Range: 4,000 nautical miles (7,000 km) at 20 knots (37 km/h; 23 mph)
- Complement: 180 (29 officers, 151 enlisted)
- Sensors & processing systems: Radar; TM 1126; AWS-6; HSA D08; HSA STIR 124; Sonar; SQS-56,
- Electronic warfare & decoys: ARES-2NC ESM, Mk 36 decoy
- Armament: 2 Mk 141 quad-pack Launcher for 8 × RGM-84 Harpoon; 1 MK 21 Guided Missile Launching System for 16 × RIM-7 Sea Sparrow; 1 × 5 inch /54 gun; 3 × Oerlikon Contraves Sea Zenith 25 mm CIWS gun systems; 2 × 3 12.75 in Mk.32 torpedo tubes in triple mountings
- Aircraft carried: 1 × AB 212 ASW helicopter
- Aviation facilities: Hangar and helipad

The Yavuz class is a group of four frigates that were built for the Turkish Navy. They were designed in Germany and are part of the MEKO family of modular warships, in this case, the MEKO 200 design. An order for ships was signed by the Turkish government in April 1983 for four MEKO frigates. Two ships were built in Germany and two in Turkey with German assistance. They are similar in design to the larger Barbaros-class frigates of the Turkish Navy, which are improved versions of the Yavuz-class frigates.

The Turkish Navy has an ongoing limited-modernization project for an electronic warfare suite. The intent is to upgrade the ships with locally produced ECM, ECCM systems, active decoys, LWRs, IRST, and the necessary user-interface systems.

== Ships ==
Ship	Namesake	Builder	Launched	Commissioned	Status
Yavuz (F 240)	Sultan Selim I Yavuz	Blohm + Voss, Hamburg	30 May 1985	11 October 1987	Preserved as a museum ship in Istanbul.
Turgutreis (F 241)	Turgut Reis	Howaldtswerke-Deutsche Werft, Kiel	17 July 1987	4 February 1988	In service
Fatih (F 242)	Sultan Mehmed II Fatih	Gölcük Naval Shipyard, Kocaeli	24 April 1987	12 October 1988	In service
Yıldırım (F 243)	Sultan Bayezid I Yıldırım	Gölcük Naval Shipyard, Kocaeli	22 July 1988	17 November 1989	In service

== See also ==
- List of Turkish current frigates
- List of Turkish Navy ships
