= TCG Osmangazi =

Amphibious warship of the Turkish Navy

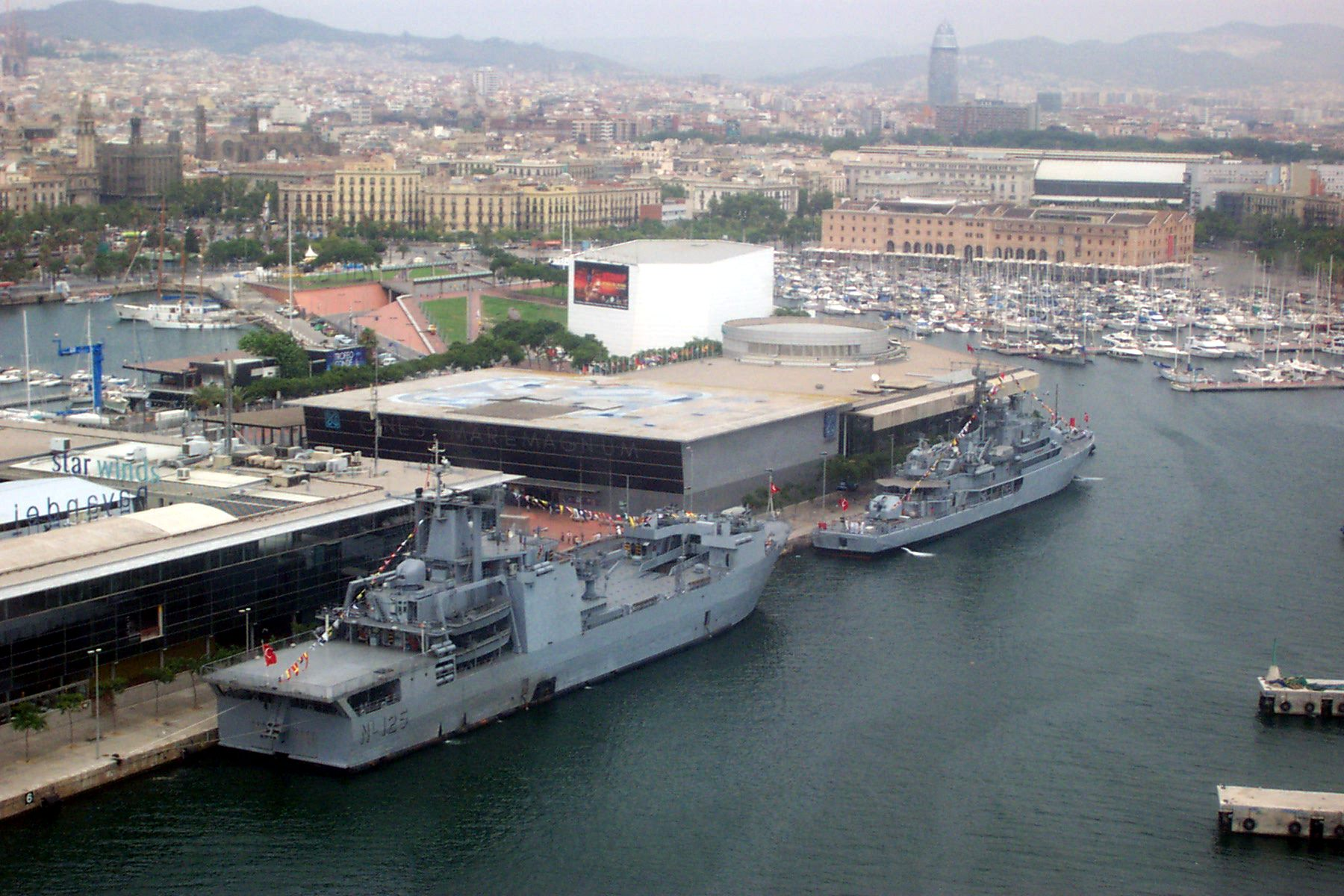
- TCG Osmangazi (NL-125) and TCG Sokullu Mehmet Paşa (A-577) at the Port of Barcelona on 3 August 2003

History
- Namesake: Osman I (r. c. 1280 – c. 1299)
- Builder: Taşkızak Naval Shipyard, Istanbul, Turkey
- Laid down: 24 July 1990
- Commissioned: 27 July 1994

General characteristics
- Type: Amphibious
- Displacement: 3,773 tons
- Length: 344 ft 5 in (104.98 m)
- Draft: 15 ft 7 in (4.75 m)
- Installed power: 8,800 hp (6,600 kW)
- Speed: 17 kn (31 km/h; 20 mph)
- Range: 4,000 nmi (7,400 km; 4,600 mi) at 15 kn (28 km/h; 17 mph)
- Complement: 9 officers and 100 men
- Armament: 2x Bofors 40 mm/70 twin autocannon, 1x Phalanx CIWS, 2x Oerlikon 20 mm autocannon

TCG Osmangazi (NL-125) is an amphibious warfare ship of type landing craft tank that was built for the Turkish Navy in the early 1990s. The ship remains in service.

== History ==
The landing ship was laid down at the Taşkızak Naval Shipyard in Istanbul, Turkey on 24 July 1990. After completion, she was handed over to the Turkish Navy, and commissioned on 27 July 1994 . She was named Osmangazi after Osman I (r. c. 1280 – c. 1299), the founder of the Ottoman Empire, and the full transliteration of Osman Gazi is Osman, the Veteran.

== Characteristics ==
Osmangazi is propelled by two MTU Diesel engines producing a total power of 8,800 hp (6,600 kW). The 105 m (344 ft)-long landing ship can carry up to 3,773 tons, which includes 900 armed troops as well as 15 main battle tanks and also four LCVPs. It has a crew of 109, including nine officers. The ship is armed with one Bofors 40 mm/70 twin autocannon, one Oerlikon 35 mm/90 twin anti-aircraft gun and two Oerlikon 20 mm autocannon. This ship also has a large space for a 10-ton class helicopter to land. The vessel is capable of deploying naval mines.

== Modernization ==
The vessel underwent extensive modernization works at the Alaybey Naval Shipyard of the Turkish Navy in İzmir in 2011. Within this project, the two Bofors 40 mm/70 twin autocannons in the ship's bow, which can be handloaded only, were replaced by two Oerlikon 35 mm/90 twin anti-aircraft guns. The Oerlikon 35 mm gun at the ship's stem was removed, and a Mk-15 Phalanx CIWS was integrated. A SLQ-32 electronic warfare suite was installed on the shipboard of Osmangazi, as being the first Turkish landing vessel having an electronic warfare system.

== Earthquake relief operation ==
The vessel transported heavy construction equipment from Port of İzmir to be used in the disaster region of the 2023 earthquake in southern Turkey.
