= Sürmene Naval Base =

Sürmene Naval Base Sürmene Deniz Üssü
- Çamlimanı, Sürmene, Trabzon, Turkey

Site information
- Type: Military base
- Controlled by: Turkish Navy

Location
- Location of Sürmene Naval Base
- Coordinates: 40°54′51″N 40°06′45″E

Sürmene Naval Base (Turkish: Sürmene Deniz Üssü) is a projected base of the Turkish Navy on the south-east coast of the Black Sea in Sürmene, Trabzon in northeastern Turkey.

The naval base will be built in Çamlimanı in Sürmene district of Trabzon Province on land covering 6 ha (15 acres). It will serve logistic support for the fleets of frigates, submarines and fast attack crafts patrolling at eastern Black Sea. It is planned that about 400 navy personnel will be stationed, and around 200 civil personnel will be employed at the base.
