= Taşkızak Naval Shipyard =

Shipyard of Turkish Navy in Istanbul

Coordinates: 41.03388°N 28.96092°E

Taşkızak Naval Shipyard (Turkish: Askeri Taşkızak Tersanesi) was a shipyard of the Turkish Navy located at the Golden Horn in Istanbul, Turkey. Established in 1455, a big part of the shipyard was relocated to the Istanbul Naval Shipyard in Tuzla, Istanbul in 2000.

== History ==
The establishment of Taşkızak Naval Shipyard started on 15 December 1455 on the order of Ottoman Sultan Mehmed II (r. 1444–1446, 1451–1481). It was called Ottoman Turkish: Tersâne-i Âmire) for "Imperial Shipyard", where "tersane" was derived from Italian: darsena for English: "dock". Shipbuilding activities were carried out in the Golden Horn hundreds of years before the Conquest of Constantinople in 1453. All ships of the Byzantine Empire were built in the Golden Horn. During the Ottoman era, large shipyards were established on the northern coastline of the Golden Horn, merging the smaller Byzantine ones.

In the beginning, small wooden boats were built. Later on, larger ships started to be built with the advancement of shipbuilding technique. During the Bayezid II (r. 1481–1512) period, the shipyards underwent rehabilitation. During the reign of Sultan Selim I (r. 1512–1520), the shipyard took its fundamental form. In the 16th century, Ottoman governor Güzelce Kasım Pasha was tasked with the bringing of craftsmen and journeymen from the Gallipoli Shipyard to reinforce the Tersane-i Amire. During the service time of Ottoman admiral Hayreddin Barbarossa, many shipbuilding masters from Algeria and Tunisia were transferred to the shipyard. After that date, large galleons were built. In the 16th and 17th centuries, the shipyard was unique in the Mediterranean world, and comparable only to the shipyards in the Republic of Venice. The technological features of the ships built in the shipyard have changed over the centuries, which can be summarized mainly in three different periods. Building of rowing ships that continued until mid of the 17th century, sailing ships until mid of the 19th century, and steamships then after. The defeat of the Ottoman fleet at the naval Battle of Navarino (1827) marked almost the end of the sailing warship era. From 1830 on, American experts came to the fore in Ottoman shipbuilding technology.

The shipyard area expanded over time to the Kağıthane Creek in the northwest. After the proclamation of the Republic of Turkey in 1923, Tersane-i Amire was divided into two parts for the construction of military and civilian ships. The shipyard is spread over an area of 7,500 m^{2} (81,000 sq ft), and has a 457 m (1,499 ft)-long quay. There are three dry docks, and two construction slipways. In the 1570s, the number of shipyard personnel was about 2,650. Through changes in the administrative structure, this number decreased to around 800 in the late 17th century.

In parallel with the expansion of the Ottoman Empire, the shipyard in the Golden Horn attained a fundamental organization, and became so the central base of the Ottoman maritime activities, which were initially carried out at Gallipoli Shipyard.

Taşkızak means literally "Stone slipway".

== Relocation ==
The two road bridges, Atatürk Bridge and Galata Bridge, spanning the Golden Horn, made the works at the shipyard difficult, and for the ships to come in and go out. Therefore, it was planned to relocate the shipyard to the Istanbul Naval Shipyard in Tuzla far east of Istanbul Province on the northern Sea of Marmara, which took place by late March 2000.

The two bridges were closed to vehicle traffic, and opened from midnight to the morning hours to allow a bulk carrier under construction and the floating dry docks with lifting capacities of 2,500 and 3,500 tonnes to be transported to their new locations.

Today, on the northern shore of the Golden Horn, where the shipyard was located, there are Haliç Shipyard, Kasımpaşa Ferry Terminal, Northern Sea Area Command of the Turkish Navy, Military Sewing Factory, Camialtı Shipyard and Hasköy Shipyard.

== Notable ships built ==
- TCG Atılay (1939), atack submarine,
- TCG Sarucabey (NL-123), LCT,
- TCG Karamürselbey (NL-124), LCT,
- TCG Osmangazi (NL-125), LCT,
- TCG Taşkızak (A-570),

== See also ==
- Imperial Arsenal

== Bibliography ==
- Önce, Mes'ud. Taşkızak Tersanesi (PDF) (in Turkish). Istanbul.
