= İskenderun Naval Museum =

- İskenderun Deniz Müzesi
- İskenderun Naval Museum
- Established: 2009; 17 years ago
- Location: Atatürk Bulvarı . Sahil Mah. 512. Sok. No : 1, İskenderun, Turkey
- Coordinates: 36°35′39″N 36°09′49″E
- Type: Naval museum
- Owner: Turkish Naval Forces

İskenderun Naval Museum is a museum in İskenderun, Turkey.

The museum is situated on Atatürk Boulevard, İskenderun ilçe (district) of Hatay Province, at 36°35′39″N 36°09′49″E.

The building was purchased by the Turkish Naval Forces in 1942. Till 2008 it was used as an office. On 26 June 2009, it was opened as a naval museum.

There are six exhibition halls. The first hall is the memorial hall of Tayfur Sökmen (1892-1980), who was the president of the short-lived Hatay Republic, which was soon merged into Turkey in 1939. The second hall is the memorial hall of Şükrü Kanatlı (1893-1954) who was the first Turkish commander in Hatay. The third hall is named after Barbaros Hayrettin Paşa. Barbaros (1478-1546) was the famous Ottoman admiral of the 16th century. The fourth hall is Cezayirli Gazi Hasan Paşa Hall. Cezayirli Gazi Hasan Pasha (1713 (?)-1790) was an able admiral of the 18th century. The fifth hall is Savarona Hall. MV Savarona was formerly the Turkish presidential yacht in which Atatürk, the founder of Turkey spent his last days in 1938. The sixth hall is named after Rauf Orbay (1880-1964) who was the commander of the Ottoman cruiser Hamidiye and one of the last naval Ministers of the Ottoman Empire. He was also an active figure during the establishment of the Turkish Republic.
