= Aksaz Naval Base =

Naval base in Marmaris, Muğla Province, Turkey

Aksaz Naval Base Aksaz Deniz Üssü
- Marmaris, Muğla

Site information
- Type: Military base
- Controlled by: Turkish Navy

Location
- Location of Aksaz Naval Base
- Coordinates: 36°50′04″N 28°23′24″E

Site history
- In use: 1992 - present

Garrison information
- Current commander: Rear admiral Semih Ozangüç

Aksaz Naval Base (Turkish: Aksaz Deniz Üssü) is a base of the Turkish Navy on the south-east coast of the Aegean Sea in Marmaris, Muğla. In addition to the military buildings, the base houses apartment-like barracks and social facilities stretched over 8,000 acres (32 km^{2}) of land. Six helicopters are also stationed at Aksaz.

== History ==
To meet the requirements of the Turkish Navy's power presence in the Mediterranean and Aegean Sea, extensive planning was started in the late 1960s for the search of the location of a naval base. The selected area was Karaağaç Bay at Aksaz, 13 km (8.1 mi) east of Marmaris in Muğla Province. The place had been mentioned by Piri Reis in Ottoman historical documents as the most appropriate natural harbor capable of hosting a large naval fleet.

Construction of the naval base started in 1983. With the completion of the infrastructure in 1992, units and vessels of the navy started to move in. The base reached its final stage in 2000. Naval Base Aksaz is today a modern facility, preferred for logistic support also by foreign navies.

== Operations ==
At the Aksaz Naval Base, the Southern Sea Area Command of the Turkish Navy maintains special units as:

- Su Altı Savunma (SAS) (Underwater Defense)
- Su Altı Taaruz (SAT) (Underwater Attack)
