= Foça Naval Base =

Foça Naval Base Foça Deniz Üssü
- Foça, İzmir Province
- Location of Foça Naval Base

Site information
- Type: Military base
- Controlled by: Turkish Navy

Location
- Coordinates: 38.63390°N 26.76677°E

Foça Naval Base (Turkish: Foça Deniz Üssü) is a base of the Turkish Navy on the eastern coast of Aegean Sea, 4.2 km (2.6 mi) south by south-east of Foça in İzmir Province. The base is home to the Marines (Naval Infantry) for amphibious operations.

At the Foça Naval Base, the Southern Sea Area Command of the Turkish Navy maintains several Marines and Special Operations units.

- Amphibious Marines Brigade (Turkish: Amfibi Deniz Piyade Tugayı) consisting of 4,500 men, three amphibious battalions, a main battle tank battalion, an artillery battalion, a support battalion and other company-sized units,
- Underwater Attack Commando Detachment (Turkish: Su Altı Taarruz} - SAT). The missions of the SAT include the acquisition of military intelligence, amphibious assault, counter-terrorism and VIP protection.
- Underwater Defense Commando Detachment (Turkish: Su Altı Savunma - SAS)

Homeported vessels are various landing ships and crafts of LST, LCT and LCM.
