= Bartın Naval Base =

Bartın Naval Base Bartın Deniz Üssü
- Bartın
- Location of Bartın Naval Base

Site information
- Type: Military base
- Controlled by: Turkish Navy

Location
- Coordinates: 41.68250°N 32.23822°E

Site history
- In use: 1965 - present

Bartın Naval Base (Turkish: Bartın Deniz Üssü) is a submarine base of the Turkish Navy on the southern coast of the Black Sea in Bartın Province north of Turkey. The base is assigned to the Turkish Northern Sea Area Command. It is located 9.8 km (6.1 mi) west by north-west of Bartın.

The submarine pen, adjacent to the Port of Bartın, was built between 1960 and 1965 by the Turkish construction company STFA to give underground shelter to the Black Sea submarine flotilla.
