= Military equipment of Turkey =

Overview of military equipments used by the Republic of Turkey

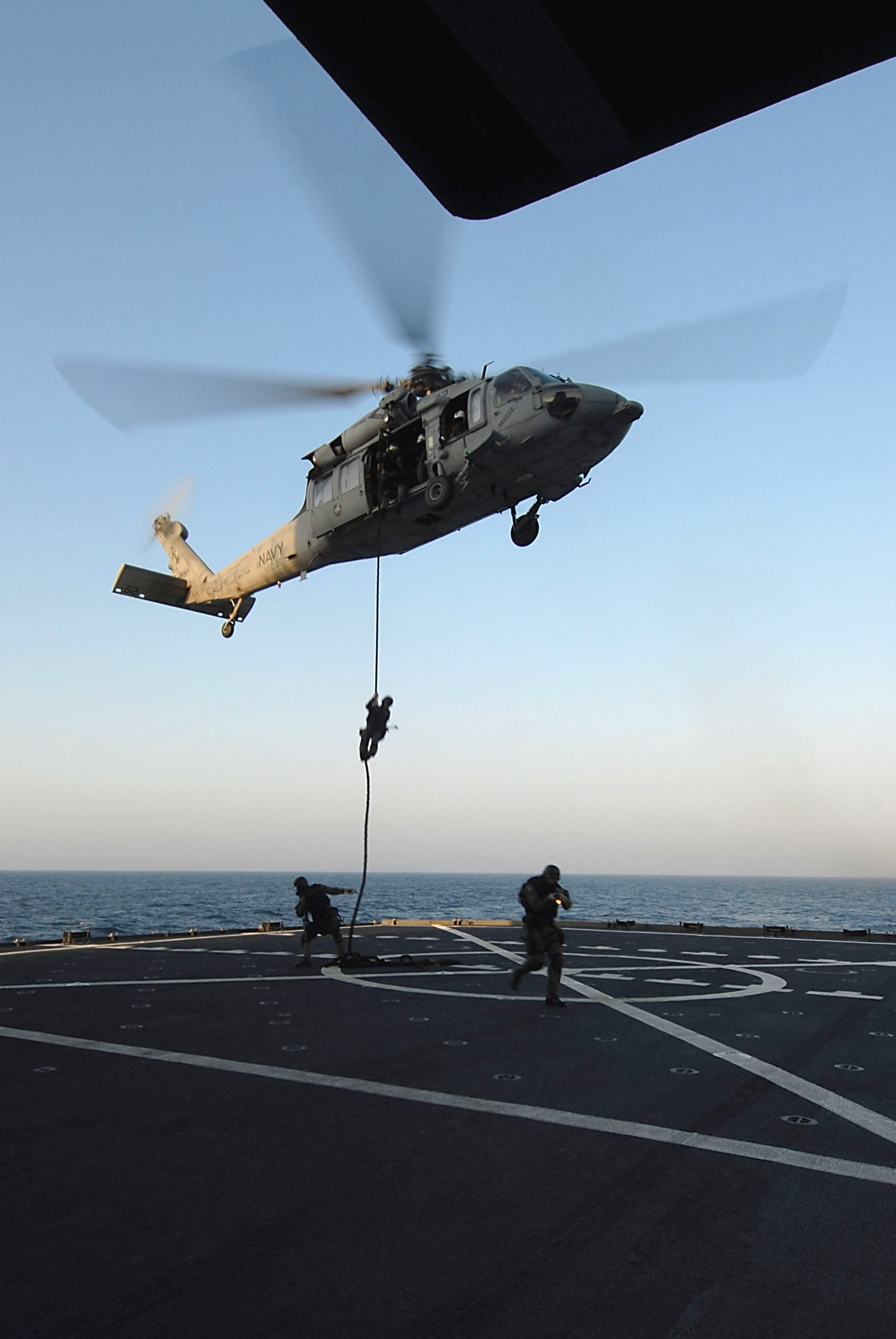

Military equipment of Turkey.
