= TCG Turgutreis (F 241) =

Barbaros-class frigate of the Turkish Navy

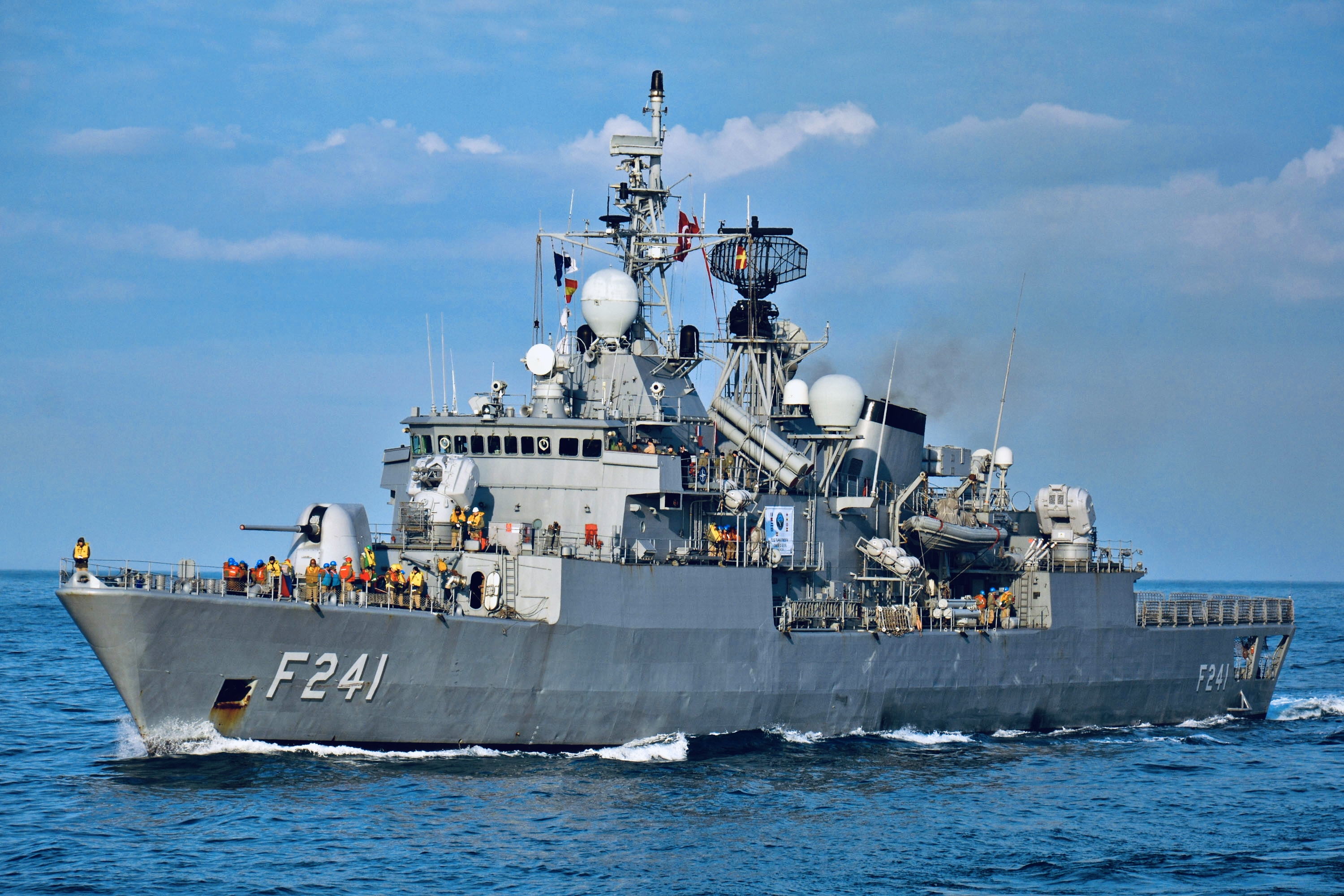
- TCG Turgutreis on 17 February 2015

History

Turkey
- Name: Turgutreis
- Namesake: Dragut
- Builder: Howaldtswerke-Deutsche Werft, Kiel, Germany
- Launched: 17 July 1987
- Commissioned: 4 February 1988
- Identification: Pennant number: F 241
- Status: Active

General characteristics
- Class & type: Yavuz-class frigate
- Displacement: 3,030 tons full load
- Length: 110.50 m (362.53 ft)
- Beam: 13.25 m (43.47 ft)
- Draught: 3.94 m (12.93 ft)
- Installed power: 4 MTU 20V 1163 diesel-engines, 30,000 hp (22,000 kW) CODAD
- Propulsion: 2 shaft, controllable pitch propellers
- Speed: 27 knots (50 km/h; 31 mph)
- Range: 4,000 nautical miles (7,000 km) at 20 knots (37 km/h)
- Complement: 180 (29 officers, 151 enlisted)
- Sensors & processing systems: Radar; TM 1126; AWS-6; HSA D08; HSA STIR 124; Sonar; SQS-56,
- Electronic warfare & decoys: ARES-2NC ESM, Mk 36 decoy
- Armament: 2 Mk 141 quad-pack Launcher for 8 × RGM-84 Harpoon; 1 MK 21 Guided Missile Launching System for 16 × RIM-7 Sea Sparrow; 1 × 5 inch /54 gun; 3 × Oerlikon Contraves Sea Zenith 25 mm CIWS gun systems; 2 × 3 12.75 in Mk.32 torpedo tubes in triple mountings
- Aviation facilities: Hangar and platform for; 1 × AB 212 ASW helicopter

TCG Turgutreis (F 241) is a Yavuz-class frigate of the Turkish Navy.

== Development and design ==
Yavuz-class frigates were designed in Germany and are part of the MEKO family of modular warships; in this case the MEKO 200 design. An order for ships was signed by the Turkish government in April 1983 for four MEKO frigates. Two ships were built in Germany and two in Turkey with German assistance. They are similar in design to the larger Barbaros-class frigates of the Turkish Navy, which are improved versions of the Yavuz-class frigate.

The Turkish Navy has an ongoing limited modernization project for an electronic warfare suite. The intent is to upgrade the ships with locally produced ECM, ECCM systems, active decoys, LWRs, IRST, and the necessary user interface systems.

== Construction and career ==
Turgutreis was launched on 17 July 1987 by Howaldtswerke-Deutsche Werft in Kiel and commissioned on 4 February 1988.

On 10 March 2021, TCG Turgutreis & TCG Oruçreis operated alongside USS Donald Cook & VP-46 in the Black Sea.
