= Erdek Naval Base =

Erdek Naval Base Erdek Deniz Üssü
- Erdek, Balıkesir
- Location of Erdek Naval Base

Site information
- Type: Military base
- Controlled by: Turkish Navy

Location
- Coordinates: 40.39088°N 27.80382°E

Erdek Naval Base (Turkish: Erdek Deniz Üssü) is a base of the Turkish Navy on the south coast of the Sea of Marmara 1.2 km (0.75 mi) south-east of Erdek in Balıkesir Province. It is the principal base for mine warfare vessels.

== Operations ==
- 1st Minehunter and Minesweeper Flotilla Commodore (1. Arama Tarama Filotillası Komodorluğu)
- 2nd Minehunter and Minesweeper Flotilla Commodore (2. Arama Tarama Filotillası Komodorluğu)
- Mine Warfare Support Center Command (Mayın Harbi Destek Merkezi Komutanlığı)

== Homeported vessels ==
=== 1st Minehunter and Minesweeper Flotilla ===
- A or Aydın class minehunters
  - TCG Alanya (M 265)
  - TCG Amasra (M 266)
  - TCG Ayvalık (M 267)
  - TCG Akçakoca (M 268)
- S class minesweepers
  - TCG Silifke (M 514)
  - TCG Saros (M 515)
  - TCG Sığacık (M 516)
  - TCG Sapanca (M 517)
  - TCG Sarıyer (M 518)

=== 2nd Minehunter and Minesweeper Flotilla ===
- E or Engin class minehunters
  - TCG Edincik (M 260), ex HMS Grecian (J352)
  - TCG Edremit (M 261), ex HMS Chance (J340)
  - TCG Enez (M 262)
  - TCG Erdek (M 263)
  - TCG Erdemli (M 264), ex HMS Catherine (J12)
- F class minesweepers
  - TCG Foça (M 500)
  - TCG Fethiye (M 501)
  - TCG Fatsa (M 502), ex HMS Fairy (J403)
  - TCG Finike (M 503), ex HMS Gazelle (J342)
