= Gölcük Naval Base =

Main base of the Turkish Navy

Gölcük Naval Base Gölcük Deniz Ana Üssü
- Gölcük, Kocaeli
- Location of Gölcük Naval Base

Site information
- Type: Military base
- Controlled by: Turkish Navy

Location
- Coordinates: 40.723°N 29.803°E

Site history
- In use: 1933 – present

Gölcük Naval Base (Turkish: Gölcük Deniz Ana Üssü) is the main base of the Turkish Navy on the east coast of the Sea of Marmara in Gölcük, Kocaeli. It is the principal base for logistic support with various facilities stretched over 1,800 acres (7.3 km^{2}) of land.

In addition to the workplaces, the base houses apartment-like barracks, social facilities, a military hospital, a military museum and an archive for naval history.

The shipyard at the base is capable of constructing frigates, submarines, fast attack boats and auxiliary vessels with high technology in recognized standards.

== History ==
In the late 1920s, the area in Gölcük was chosen to build a floating drydock large enough to hold the Turkish battlecruiser TCG Yavuz for repair work of her war damage. Later, along with the German shipbuilding company Flender Werke that constructed the floating drydock, various repair shops, plants for the production of naval mine, torpedo and battery and housing barracks were built in Gölcük.

These facilities were extended with various other buildings stretching over a big swampland, a small lake and hazelnut orchard fields in Gölcük. The Convention on the Turkish straits, part of the Treaty of Lausanne signed in 1923, banned military facilities in the Turkish Straits. So, Turkish Navy's infrastructure, like shipyards and naval facilities, at the Golden Horn and İstinye in Istanbul were systematically relocated to Gölcük. Main warships of the Turkish Navy, like battlecruisers, destroyers and torpedo boats, were then stationed in Gölcük.

Finally, in 1933 the parliament enacted Gölcük as the main naval base of the Turkish Navy.

=== 1999 Gölcük earthquake ===
The headquarters of the Battle Fleet Command in Gölcük, established in 1964, and many other buildings were destroyed by the İzmit earthquake on August 17, 1999. The Command was temporarily housed in the Preveze War Games Center at the same base until July 2000, when the new headquarters building was completed.

The earthquake cost the lives of 441 base personnel in total including 28 navy officers of various ranks, 136 warrant officers, one naval cadet, 39 civil officials, 9 corporals, 82 seamen and 126 workers. Rear admiral Orhan Aydın, commander of the Turkish Naval Academy in Tuzla, Istanbul, was among the victims of the earthquake.

=== 2016 Turkish coup d'etat attempt ===
On 16 July 2016, a Turkish anti-government group seized a frigate, later identified as the TCG Yavuz (F-240), from the Gölcük Naval Base. Fleet Commander, Admiral Veysel Kösele, and Commodore Levent Karim were taken hostage by the group. This event is in conjunction with the Turkish coup d'état attempt on 15 July 2016. Previously, the head of the Turkish Armed Forces, Chief of General Staff Hulusi Akar, was taken hostage by coup perpetrators on 15 July 2016 and rescued by pro-government troops the following morning.

Turkish Minister of Justice, Bekir Bozdağ, reported that Admiral Veysel Kösele was safe, and that the seized frigate was returned by the anti-government group later that day.

== Operations ==
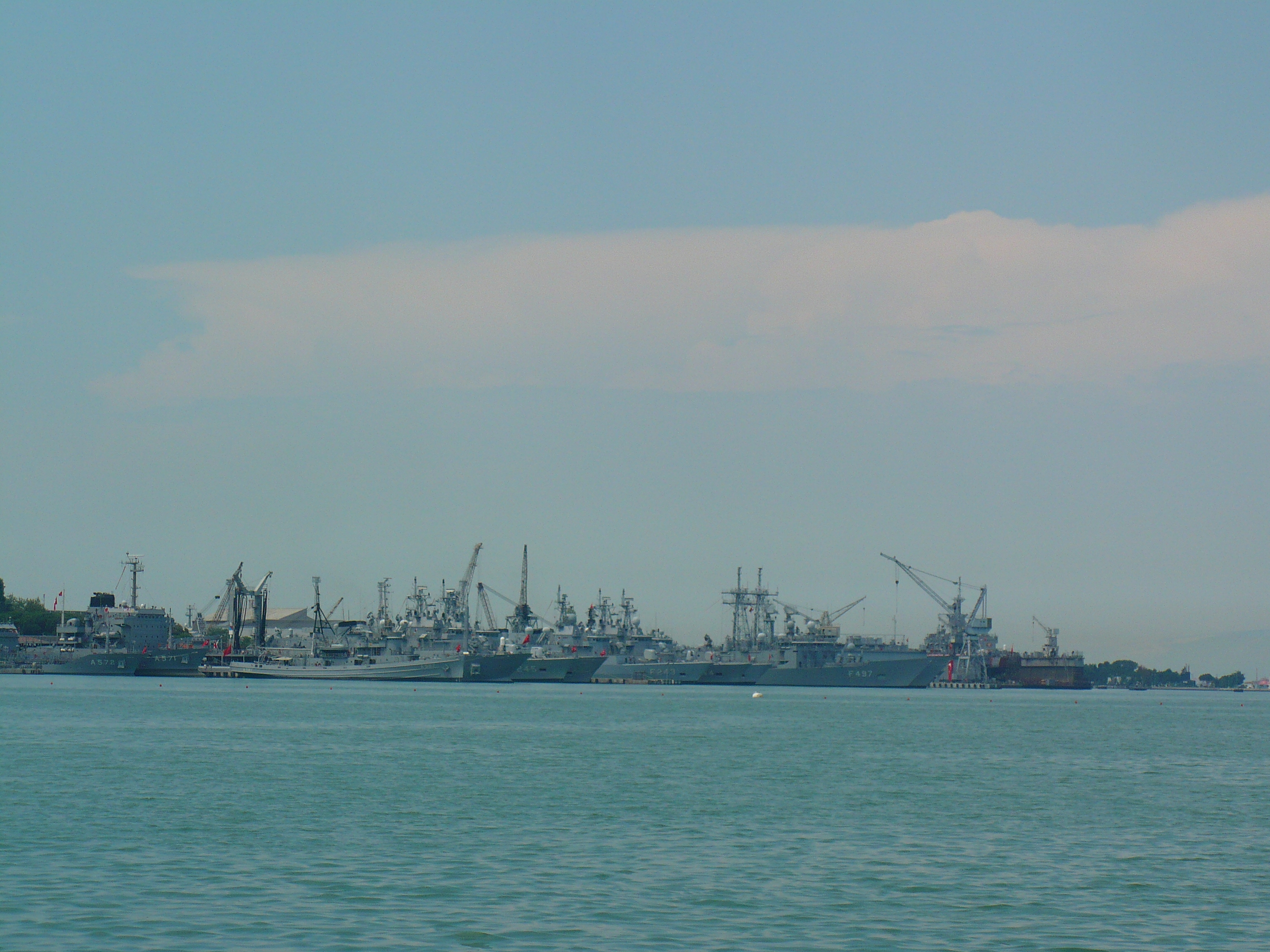
Gölcük Naval Base

- Battle Fleet Command (Harp Filosu Komutanlığı)
- Attack Boat Fleet Command (Hücumbot Filosu Komutanlığı)
- Submarine Fleet Command (Denizaltı Filosu Komutanlığı)
- Gölcük Shipyard Command (Gölcük Tersanesi Komutanlığı)
- Naval Supply Center Command (Deniz İkmal Merkezi Komutanlığı)
- Tactics Development, Doctrine and Analysis Center Command (Taktik Geliştirme Doktrin ve Analiz Merkezi Komutanlığı)
- Invertory Control Center Command (Envanter Kontrol Merkezi Komutanlığı)
- Logistic Support Vessels Commodore (Lojistik Destek Gemileri Komodorluğu)
