= Turkish Naval Forces =

Naval warfare service branch of the Turkish Armed Forces

- Türk Deniz Kuvvetleri
- Seal of the Turkish Naval Forces
- Founded: 1081 (official claim: the first Turkish fleet in the Aegean Sea); 10 July 1920 (as the Directorate of Naval Affairs); 1 July 1949 (as the Turkish Naval Forces Command)
- Country: Turkey
- Type: Navy
- Role: Naval warfare
- Size: 45,000 active personnel 55,000 reserve personnel
- Part of: TAF
- Headquarters: Ankara
- Mottos: "Effective, Deterrent, and Respected." (Turkish: "Etkin, Caydırıcı, Saygın."
- Colors: Blue; Gold; White
- March: Turkish Navy March
- Anniversaries: 27 September
- Equipment: List of equipment of the Turkish Naval Forces; List of active ships of the Turkish Naval Forces
- Website: www.dzkk.tsk.tr/en-US

Commanders
- Commander-in-Chief: President Recep Tayyip Erdoğan
- Minister of National Defence: Yaşar Güler
- Chief of the General Staff: General Metin Gürak
- Commander: Admiral Ercüment Tatlıoğlu
- Chief of Staff of Turkish Naval Forces: Vice Admiral İbrahim Özdem Koçer

Insignia
- Identification symbol

- Naval Aviation Roundel

- Masthead Pennant

The Turkish Naval Forces (Turkish: Türk Deniz Kuvvetleri), or Turkish Navy (Turkish: Türk Donanması), is the naval warfare service branch of the Turkish Armed Forces.

The modern naval traditions and customs of the Turkish Navy can be traced back to 10 July 1920, when it was established as the Directorate of Naval Affairs during the Turkish War of Independence led by Mustafa Kemal Atatürk. Since July 1949, the service has been officially known as the Turkish Naval Forces.

In 2008, the Turkish Navy had a reported active personnel strength of 48,600; this figure included an Amphibious Marines Brigade as well as several Special Forces and Commando detachments. As of early 2021, the navy operates a wide variety of ships and 60 maritime aircraft.

== History ==
=== Ottoman fleet after Mudros ===
Following the demise of the Ottoman Empire in the aftermath of World War I, on 3 November 1918, the fleet commander of the Ottoman Navy, rear admiral Arif Pasha, ordered all flags to be struck on all warships lying in the Golden Horn, and the Ottoman Navy ceased to exist. The major surface combatants of the former Ottoman fleet (totalling 62,000 tons) were rendered inactive by the Allies and in accordance with the terms of the Armistice of Mudros, the warships were disarmed during the last week of 1918. The battleship Turgut Reis and the cruisers Hamidiye and Mecidiye were substantially limited and kept inactive inside the Golden Horn by the occupying forces. Due to its larger size, the battlecruiser Yavuz Sultan Selim was transferred to the Gulf of İzmit on the grounds that she could adversely affect the sea traffic inside the Golden Horn; while her ammunition and guns were removed. During this period, only a small number of Ottoman Navy vessels were allowed by the Allies to remain on active coast guard duties and were released from internment on 26 February 1919; such as the torpedo boats Akhisar and Dıraç which patrolled the Sea of Marmara, the gunboat Hızır Reis which patrolled the Gulf of İzmir, and the minelayers Nusret and Tir-i Müjgan which conducted mine cleaning operations in the Gulf of Saros.

Before the Turkish War of Independence began, the Ministry of the Navy (Bahriye Nazırlığı) sent the gunboat Preveze to Sinop and the gunboat Aydın Reis to Trabzon in February 1919 for surveillance, reconnaissance and patrol duties. However, a lack of coal to fuel their propulsion systems caused the Preveze and Aydın Reis to remain in harbour until the end of 1919. During the early stages of the Turkish War of Independence, these two gunboats did not return to Istanbul, despite heavy pressure from the Ottoman government and the Allies. Instead, they were placed under the command of the Turkish liberation forces led by Mustafa Kemal Atatürk and headquartered in Ankara.

=== Turkish War of Independence ===
==== Directorate of Naval Affairs ====
A large number of the naval officers and students of the Naval Academy went to Anatolia for participating in the Turkish War of Independence. On 10 July 1920, the Directorate of Naval Affairs (Umur-u Bahriye Müdürlüğü) was founded in Ankara under the Ministry of National Defense and was given the duty of organizing and maintaining strategic logistical shipping through the Black Sea in order to provide the Turkish liberation forces in Anatolia with weapons and other supplies. All existing naval institutions in the parts of Anatolia that were administered by the Ankara government were assigned to this Directorate. The Directorate of Naval Affairs was extremely successful in organizing local surface units and volunteers and in forming an intelligence network to discover the movements of the enemy ships. As a result, logistic transportation was carried out effectively. The Turkish Grand National Assembly in Ankara made an agreement with the Soviet Union to procure supplies for the Turkish liberation forces. Aydın Reis left from Samsun (on 16 September 1920) and Preveze left from Trabzon (on 30 September 1920) for Novorossiysk in order to transport weapons, other supplies and financial aid to the Turkish liberation forces. The Trabzon Shipping Detachment, which was founded on 21 September 1920, was renamed as the Trabzon Naval Shipping Command with the directive issued by the Ministry of National Defense on 26 October 1920. On 1 January 1921, the Samsun Naval Command was formed. In the subsequent stages of the Turkish War of Independence, due to the growing need for maritime shipping and the increase in the quantity and quality of the units and small ships, the organizational structure of the Directorate of Naval Affairs was gradually extended.

In the same period, a number of Turkish civilian seamen formed a group under the name of the Naval Aid Organization (Muavenet-i Bahriye). This group secretly obtained cannons, light weapons, ammunition, landmines and ordnance from the former Ottoman military warehouses in Istanbul that were under the control of the occupying Allies and sent them to the Turkish liberation forces in Anatolia with civil water transportation crafts.

==== Presidency of the Naval Department ====
On 1 March 1921, the Directorate of Naval Affairs was transformed into the Presidency of the Naval Department (Bahriye Dairesi Reisliği) and had control over the Naval Commands in Samsun, Amasra and İzmit (formed on 28 June 1921); the Naval Transport Detachment in Trabzon; the Naval Transport Command in Ereğli; the Naval Detachment in Lake Eğirdir; and the Naval Liaison Group in Fethiye (formed on 16 March 1921.) During the War of Independence, Turkish naval forces transported 220,000 tons of weapons, ammunition and equipment to the land forces in Anatolia.

=== Ministry of the Navy ===
Following the Armistice of Mudanya on 11 October 1922, the former Ottoman Ministry of the Navy (Bahriye Nazırlığı) building in the Kasımpaşa quarter of Istanbul, on the Golden Horn, became the headquarters of the Istanbul Naval Command on 14 November 1922. The establishment of the Ministry of the Navy (Bahriye Vekâleti) of the Republic of Turkey, headquartered in Ankara, was decided by the Grand National Assembly on 29 December 1924, and Topçu İhsan Bey (İhsan Eryavuz) was appointed the first (and only) Naval Minister of Turkey. When the Republic of Turkey was established on 29 October 1923, the former Ottoman vessels that remained under Turkish control were as follows:

In active service: 2 cruisers (Hamidiye, Peyk-i Şevket), 2 yachts (Ertuğrul, Söğütlü), 1 destroyer (Taşoz), 4 gunboats (Burak Reis, Hızır Reis, Kemal Reis, İsa Reis), 1 minelayer (Nusret), 1 aviso (Galata), 4 tugs and 7 motorboats. Out of service (needing repair): 2 battleships (Yavuz Sultan Selim, Turgut Reis), 2 cruisers (Berk-i Satvet, Mecidiye), 4 destroyers (Muâvenet-i Millîye, Nümune-i Hamiyet, Basra, Samsun), 6 torpedo boats (Sultanhisar, Yunus, Akhisar, Dıraç, Musul, Berk Efşan), 1 gunboat (Sakız).

Preparations were made to carry out the maintenance and overhaul of small-tonnage warships (the three Taşoz-class destroyers and the gunboats Burak Reis, Sakız, İsa Reis and Kemal Reis) and to make them combat-ready. Thus, the cruiser Hamidiye, which was planned to be employed as a Cadet Training Ship, was overhauled.

During the 1920s, a commitment to refurbish the battlecruiser TCG Yavuz (which remained in active service until 1950) as the centerpiece of the republic's fleet was the only constant element of the various naval policies that were put forward. The battlecruiser remained in İzmit until 1926, in a neglected state: only two of her boilers worked, she could not steer or steam, and she still had two unrepaired scars from the mine damage in 1918. Enough money was raised to allow the purchase of a new 26,000-metric-ton (26,000-long-ton) floating dock from the German company Flender, as Yavuz could not be towed anywhere without the risk of her sinking in rough seas. The French company Atelier et Chantiers de St. Nazaire-Penhöet was contracted in December 1926 to oversee the subsequent refit, which was carried out by the Gölcük Naval Shipyard. Since the Treaty of Lausanne in 1923 required the disarmament of the Turkish Straits, the infrastructures belonging to the Turkish Naval Forces on the Bosphorus (in İstinye) and on the Golden Horn were transferred to Gölcük, located on the southern shore of the Gulf of İzmit, in the easternmost part of the Sea of Marmara. In this period, Gölcük was designated as the main Turkish naval base. Turkey regained full military control over the Turkish Straits and the right to fortify the shoreline with the Montreux Convention in 1936.

The overhaul works of TCG Yavuz proceeded over three years (1927–1930); they were delayed when several compartments of the dock collapsed while being pumped out. Yavuz was slightly damaged before she could be refloated and the dock had to be repaired before the overhaul works could be resumed. The Minister of the Navy, İhsan Eryavuz, was convicted of embezzlement in the resulting investigation which became known as the Yavuz-Havuz case (havuz meaning "dock" in Turkish naval engineering terminology.) The investigation revealed that İhsan Eryavuz had reduced the insurance obligation of the French company (Atelier et Chantiers de St. Nazaire-Penhöet) from 5 million to 1.5 million Turkish liras, and was convicted guilty of fraud, which resulted in the abolition of the Ministry of the Navy on 27 December 1927.

=== Undersecretariat of the Sea ===
Following the dissolution of the Ministry of the Navy, the naval forces were reorganized under the Ministry of National Defense and on 16 January 1928 the Undersecretariat of the Sea (Deniz Müsteşarlığı) was established in order to undertake the duties of the former Ministry of the Navy. With this new reorganization, the Turkish Fleet Command was put under the command of the Turkish General Staff in terms of administration and logistics. On 2 November 1930, the Naval War College (Deniz Harp Akademisi) commenced training and education of Staff Officers at its facilities in the Yıldız Palace. During World War II, the naval schools were temporarily relocated from Istanbul to Mersin for security reasons and conducted education and training activities in this city.

In 1933, with the approval of the Turkish Grand National Assembly, Gölcük was designated as the main base of the Turkish Navy. In the same year, the first new ship built at the Gölcük Naval Shipyard, the tanker TCG Gölcük, was laid down; and launched the following year. With the signing of the Montreux Convention in 1936, Turkey's sovereignty over the Turkish Straits was internationally recognized, and Fortified Area Commands were founded on the Bosphorus and Dardanelles straits, with Naval Detachments assigned to these Commands.

=== Naval Forces Command ===
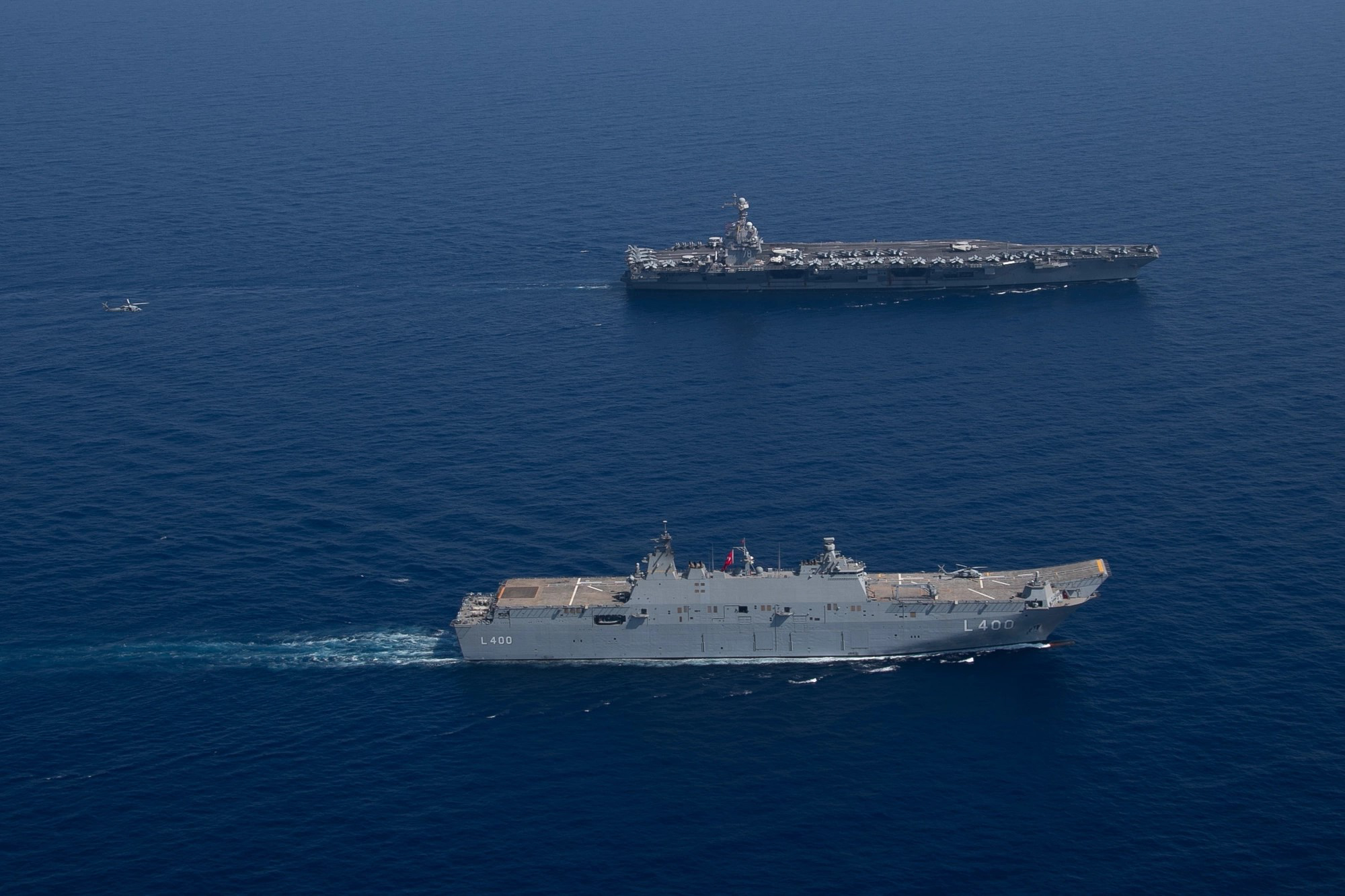
TCG Anadolu and USS Gerald R. Ford during a Turkish-American naval exercise in the eastern Mediterranean Sea on August 21, 2023.

The Turkish Naval Forces were represented under the title of the Naval Undersecreteriat (Deniz Müsteşarlığı) at the Turkish General Staff Headquarters in Ankara from 1928 to 1949.

The historic decree of the Higher Military Council on 15 August 1949 led to the foundation of the Turkish Naval Forces Command (Deniz Kuvvetleri Komutanlığı).

After Turkey joined NATO on 18 February 1952, the Turkish Naval Forces were integrated into the organizational branches of the alliance.

== Structure ==
In 1961, the Turkish Naval Forces Command was organized into four main subordinate commands: The Turkish Fleet Command, the Turkish Northern Sea Area Command, the Turkish Southern Sea Area Command and the Turkish Naval Training Command.

In 1995, the Turkish Naval Training Command was renamed as the Turkish Naval Training and Education Command.

=== Current Structure ===
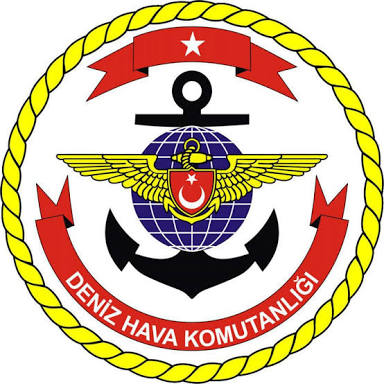
Naval Aviation Group Command

- Turkish Naval Forces
  - Fleet Command, Gölcük Naval Base, Kocaeli
    - Surface Action Group Command, Gölcük Naval Base, Kocaeli
      - Northern Task Group Command, Gölcük Naval Base, Kocaeli
      - Western Task Group Command, Foça, İzmir
      - Southern Task Group Command, Aksaz, Muğla
    - Submarine Group Command, Gölcük Naval Base, Kocaeli
    - Fast Patrol Boat Group Command, İstanbul
    - Mine Warfare Group Command, Erdek Naval Base, Balıkesir
    - Logistic Support Group Command, Gölcük Naval Base, Kocaeli
    - Naval Aviation Group Command, Cengiz Topel Naval Air Station, Kocaeli
    - Gölcük Naval Base Command, Kocaeli
    - Gölcük Naval Shipyard Command, Kocaeli
    - Inventory Control Center Command, Kocaeli
    - Marine Supply Center Command, Kocaeli
    - Yıldızlar Surface Training Center, Gölcük, Kocaeli
  - Northern Sea Area Command, İstanbul
    - Istanbul Strait Command, Anadolukavağı, İstanbul
    - Çanakkale Strait Command, Nara, Çanakkale
    - Black Sea Area Command, Karadeniz Ereğli, Zonguldak
    - Underwater Search and Rescue Group Command, Beykoz, İstanbul
      - Rescue Group Command
      - Underwater Defence Group Command
    - Naval Hydrography and Oceanography Division Command, Çubuklu, İstanbul
    - Bartın Naval Base Command, Bartın
    - Naval Museum Command, Beşiktaş, İstanbul
    - Istanbul Naval Shipyard Command, Pendik
  - Southern Sea Area Command, İzmir
    - Amphibious Task Group Command, Foça, İzmir
      - Amphibious Marine Brigade Command, Foça, İzmir
      - Amphibious Ships Command, Foça, İzmir
    - Aksaz Naval Base Command, Aksaz Naval Base, Marmaris
    - Mediterranean Area Command, Mersin
    - İskenderun Naval Base Command, İskenderun, Hatay
    - Aegean Sea Area Command, İzmir
    - Foça Naval Base Command, Foça, İzmir
    - Maintenance, Repair and Engineering Command, İzmir
  - Naval Training and Education Command, İstanbul
    - Training Flotilla Commodore, Tuzla, İstanbul
    - Karamürselbey Training Center Command, Karamürsel, Kocaeli
    - Derince Training Center Command, Derince, Kocaeli

=== Marines and Special Forces ===
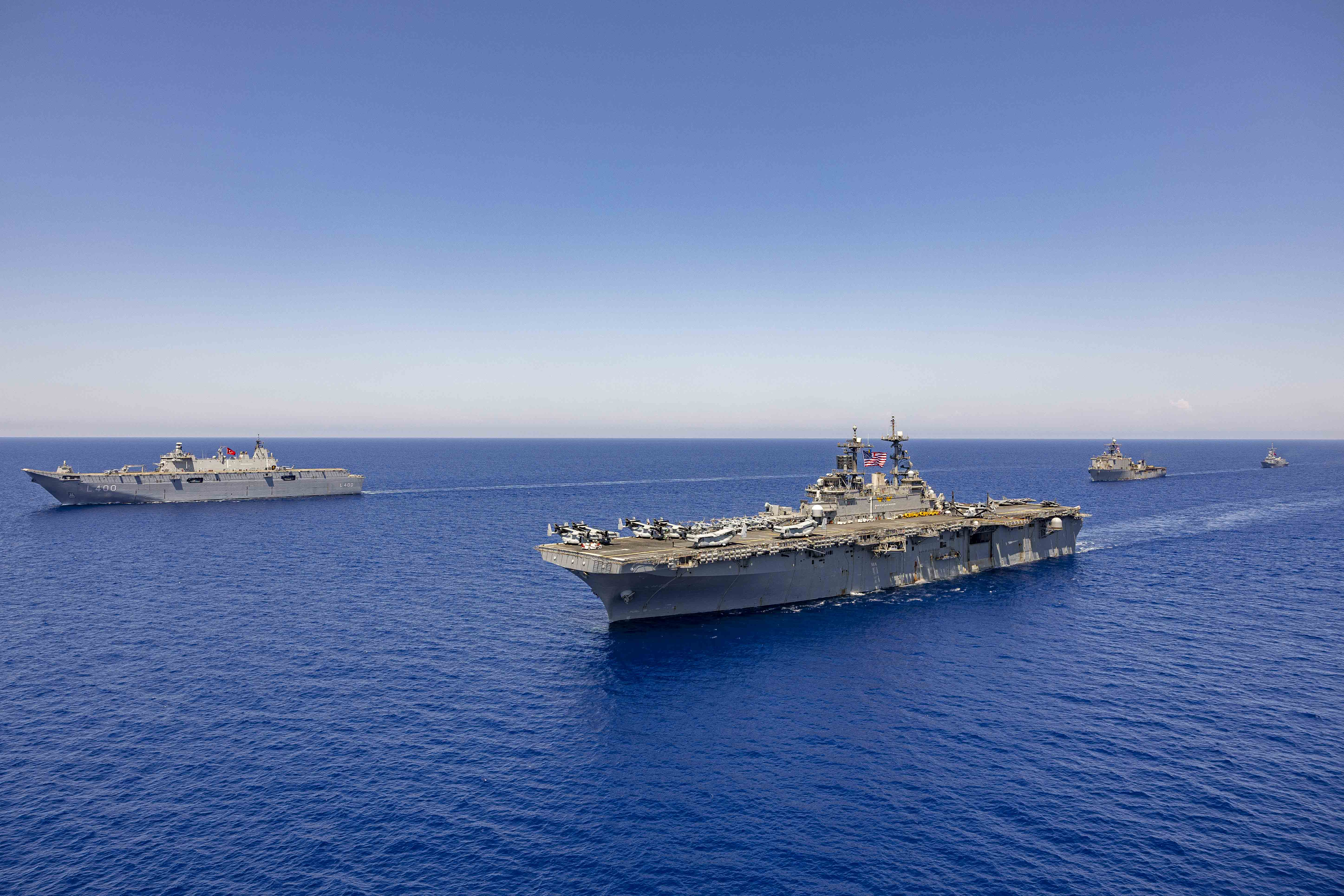
TCG Anadolu and USS Wasp during a Turkish-American naval exercise in the Mediterranean Sea which included the Marines and amphibious forces of the two NATO allies, on August 14, 2024.

The Turkish Navy maintains marine, explosive ordnance disposal and special operations units such as:

- Amphibious Marine Brigade Command (Turkish: Amfibi Deniz Piyade Tugayı Komutanlığı, AMFİBİ) – subordinate to the Amphibious Task Group Command
- Underwater Defence Group Command (Turkish: Sualtı Savunma Grup Komutanlığı, SAS) – subordinate to the Rescue and Underwater Command
- Underwater Offence Group Command (Turkish: Sualtı Taarruz Grup Komutanlığı, SAT) – directly subordinate to the Naval Forces Operations Department

== Modernisation programmes ==
The Turkish Navy is currently undergoing several modernisation programmes to replace its ageing equipment. As of 2023, the major modernisation projects are as follows:

=== Ships & Submarines ===
==== MUGEM-class aircraft carrier ====
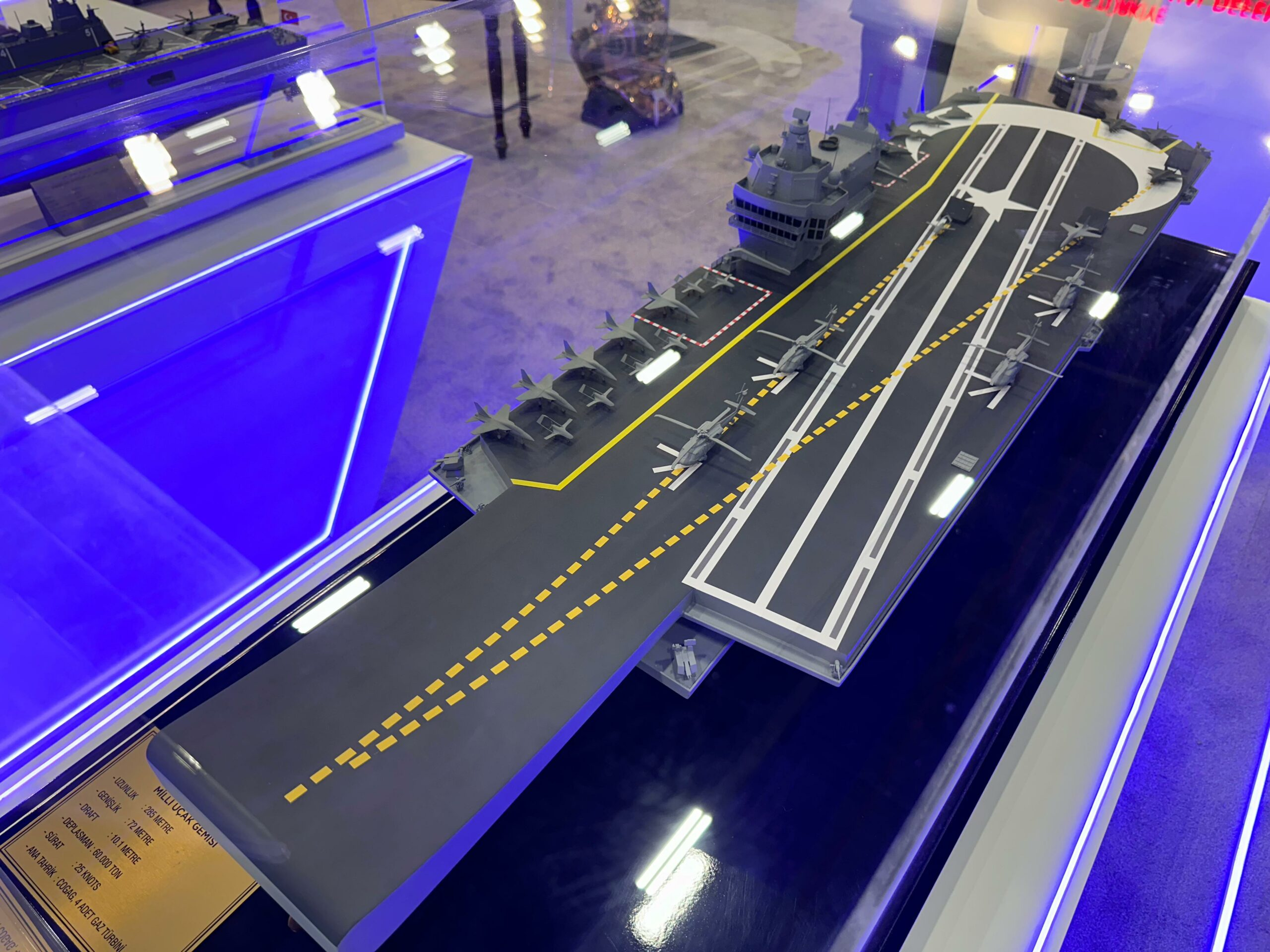
The construction of the first MUGEM-class aircraft carrier began on January 2, 2025.

On 3 January 2024, the Turkish government approved the plan for the design and construction of a large aircraft carrier, named the MUGEM-class aircraft carrier.

On 15 February 2024, the Design and Projects Office of the Turkish Navy announced that it will be a STOBAR aircraft carrier with an overall length of 285 metres (935 ft), beam of 72 metres (236 ft), draught of 10.1 metres (33 ft), and displacement of 60,000 tons. It is to have a CODLAG propulsion system and a maximum speed of more than 25 knots (29 mph; 46 km/h).

The construction of the first MUGEM-class aircraft carrier began at the Istanbul Naval Shipyard on 2 January 2025.

==== Anadolu-class amphibious assault ship / drone carrier / V/STOL aircraft carrier ====
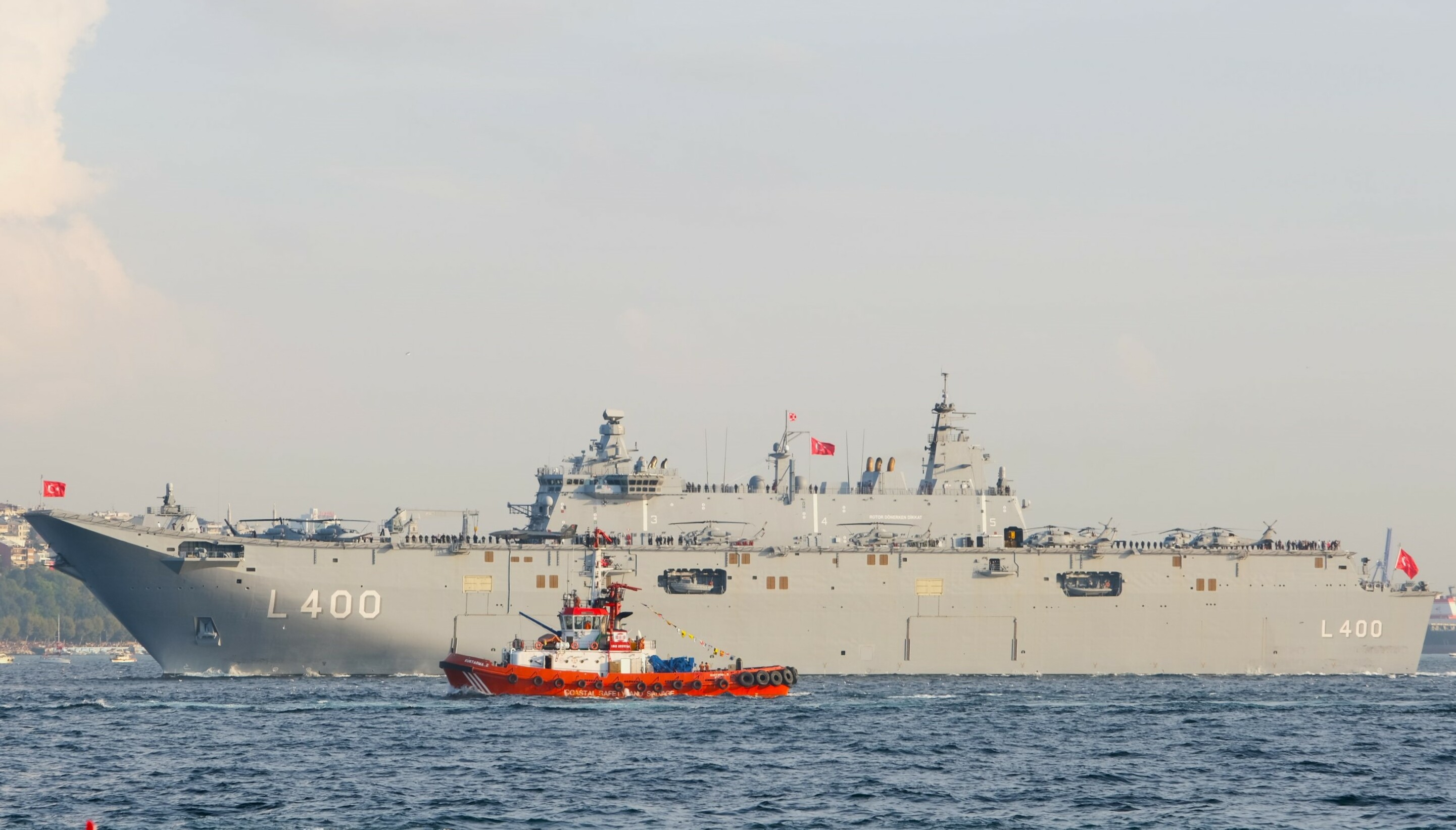
TCG Anadolu (L-400) at the Bosporus strait in Istanbul during the naval parade for celebrating the centenary of the Turkish Republic on October 29, 2023. TCG Anadolu was commissioned on April 10, 2023. Bayraktar TB3 and the jet-powered, low-observable Bayraktar Kızılelma are two UCAVs specifically designed to operate on TCG Anadolu. When configured as a V/STOL aircraft carrier, the ship's design allows it to internally carry up to 10 F-35B STOVL fighter jets and 12 medium-sized helicopters, and to host 6 more helicopters on its flight deck.

TCG Anadolu is a 27,079-tonne amphibious assault ship (LHD) and drone carrier of the Turkish Naval Forces that can also be configured as a 24,660-tonne V/STOL aircraft carrier. Construction began on 30 April 2016 by Sedef Shipbuilding Inc. at their Istanbul shipyard. TCG Anadolu was commissioned with a ceremony on 10 April 2023. The construction of a sister ship, to be named TCG Trakya, is currently being planned by the Turkish Navy.

The S-70B-28 Seahawk and the Bell AH-1W SuperCobra are the two main types of helicopters used on TCG Anadolu, with the occasional use of CH-47F Chinook helicopters of the Turkish Army during military exercises and operations. The AH-1W Super Cobras will eventually be complemented and replaced by the TAI T929 ATAK 2.

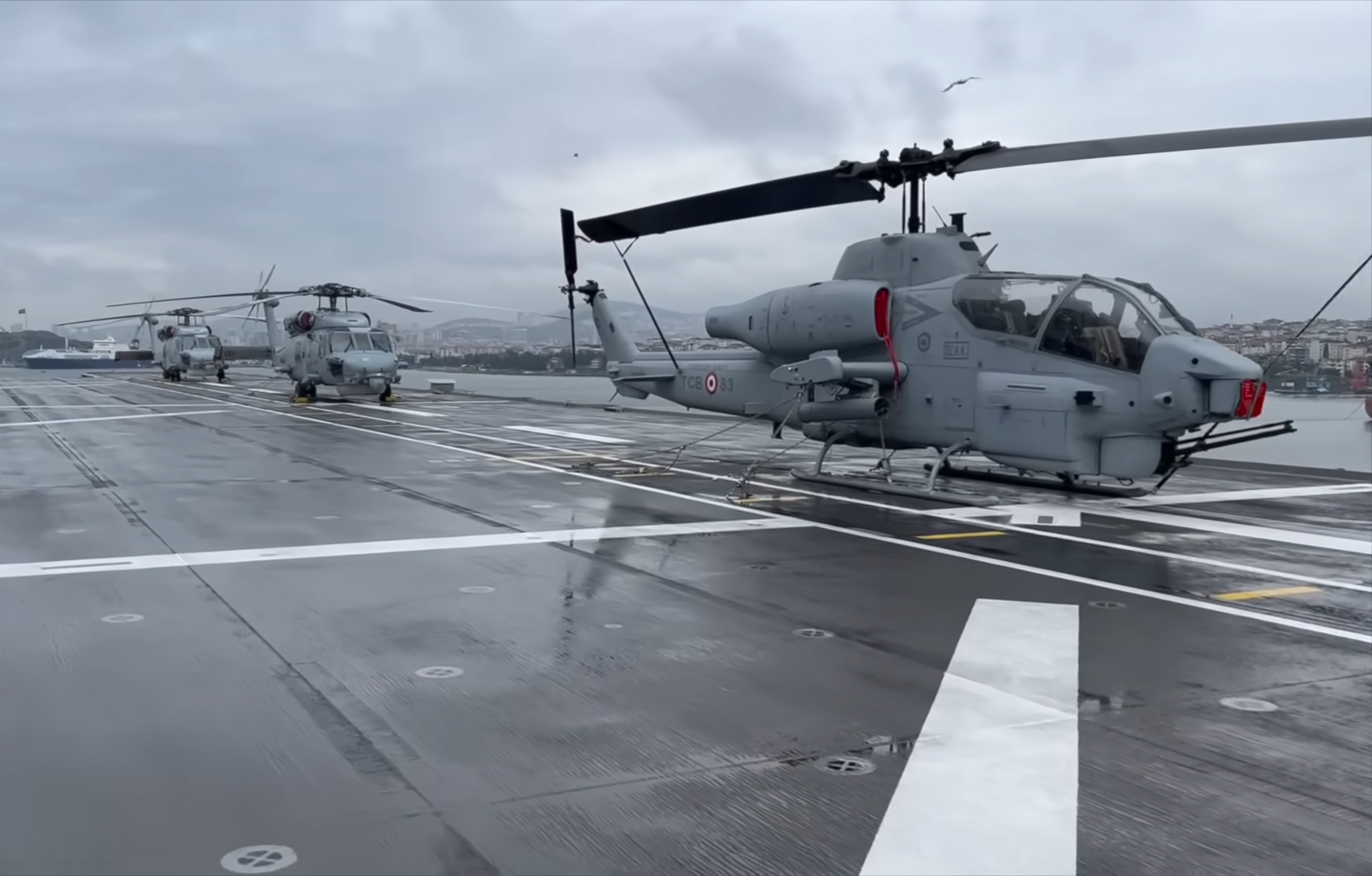
AH-1W Super Cobra and S-70B-28 Seahawk helicopters on the flight deck of TCG Anadolu.

The jet-powered, low-observable drone Bayraktar MIUS Kızılelma and the MALE UAV Bayraktar TB3 are two UCAVs that are specifically designed and manufactured by Baykar Technologies to be used on TCG Anadolu. The maiden flight of TAI Anka-3 (also part of Project MIUS), a jet-powered, flying wing type UCAV with stealth technology, was successfully completed on 28 December 2023.

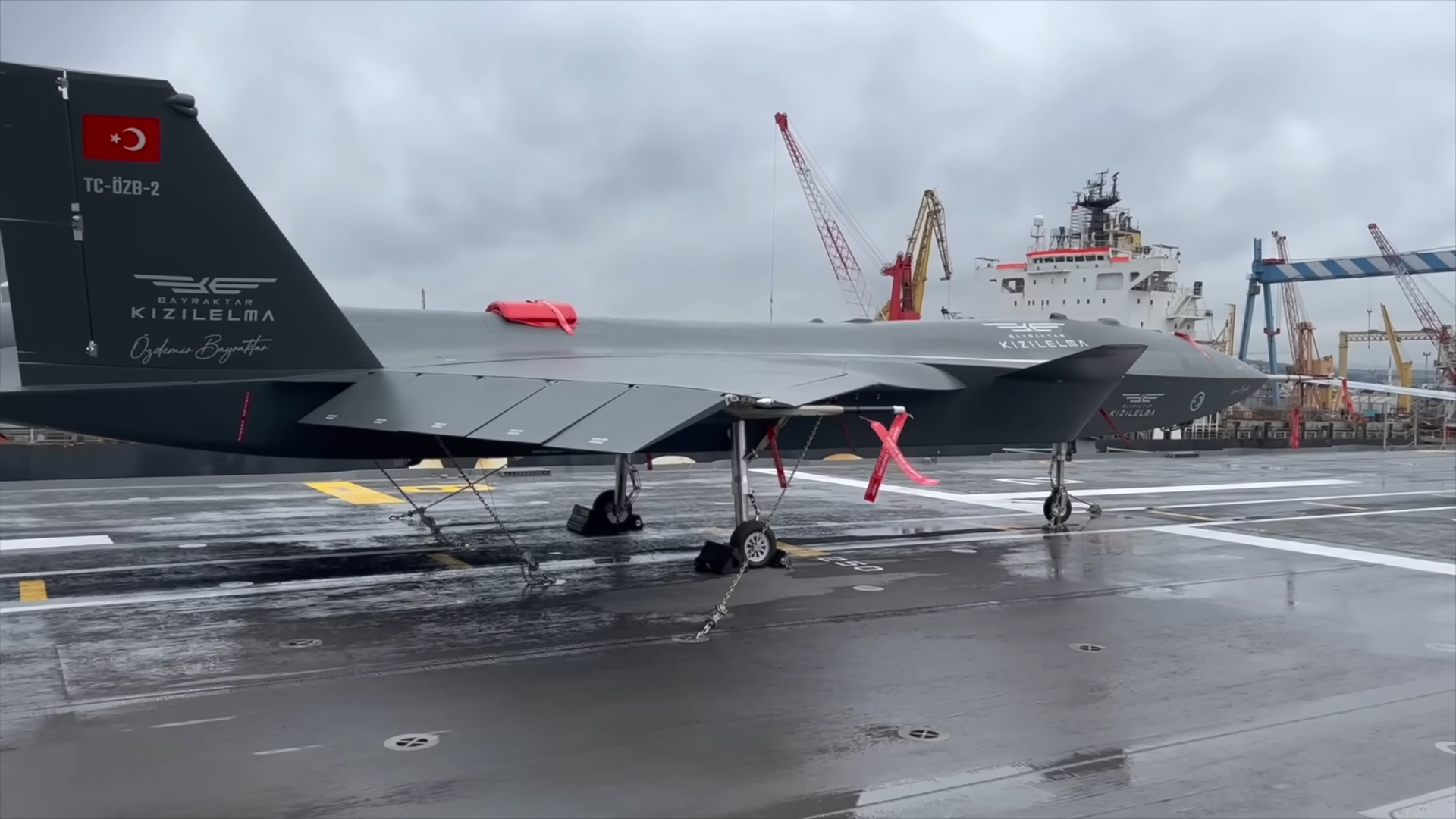
A Bayraktar Kızılelma UCAV on the flight deck of TCG Anadolu. The Kızılelma is a jet-powered, low-observable, supersonic, carrier-capable UCAV that was specifically designed to operate on TCG Anadolu.

On 19 November 2024, a Baykar Bayraktar TB3 UCAV successfully took-off from the flight deck of TCG Anadolu and landed on the ship. It was the first time a fixed-wing unmanned aircraft of this size and class had successfully landed on a short-runway landing helicopter dock, without the use of an arresting gear.

TCG Anadolu has a 1,880 m^{2} (20,200 sq ft) light cargo garage for TEU containers and 27 Amphibious Assault Vehicles (AAV); a 1,165 m^{2} (12,540 sq ft) dock which can host four Landing Craft Mechanized (LCM) or two Landing Craft Air Cushion (LCAC), or two Landing Craft Vehicle Personnel (LCVP); and a 1,410 m^{2} (15,200 sq ft) garage for heavy loads, which can host 29 main battle tanks (MBT), Amphibious Assault Vehicles, and TEU containers. The ship is protected by the ARAS-2023 diver detection sonar (DDS). She has a crew of 261 personnel: 30 officers, 49 NCOs, 59 leading seamen, and 123 ratings.

The ship has a 5,440 m^{2} (58,600 sq ft) flight deck and a 990 m^{2} (10,700 sq ft) aviation hangar which can accommodate either 12 medium-sized helicopters or 8 Boeing CH-47F Chinook heavy-lift helicopters. When the aviation hangar and the light cargo garage are unified, the ship can carry up to 25 medium-sized helicopters. Alternatively, the ship can internally carry up to 10 F-35B STOVL fighter jets and 12 medium-sized helicopters, with the possibility of hosting 6 more helicopters on the flight deck of the ship.

==== Tepe-class air defense destroyer ====
The Tepe-class destroyer is a projected anti-air warfare guided-missile destroyer currently undergoing development by the Turkish Naval Institute. The class will provide survivability in the presence of aerial threat and also support mission functions such as command, control, and communications, reconnaissance, early warning, surface warfare, anti-submarine warfare and electronic warfare. Moreover, once in service, the Tepe-class destroyers are slated to be an integral part of Turkey's expeditionary strike groups centered around the TCG Anadolu LHD and the country's future MUGEM-class aircraft carriers and TCG Trakya.

The construction of the first Tepe-class destroyer, the first MUGEM-class aircraft carrier, and the first MILDEN-class submarine began in the same day, on 2 January 2025. The first TF-2000-class destroyer and the first MUGEM-class aircraft carrier are being built at the Istanbul Naval Shipyard, while the first MILDEN-class submarine is being built at the Gölcük Naval Shipyard. Large capital vessels like the TCG Anadolu and the MUGEM-class aircraft carriers require destroyer escorts to defend them against enemy aircraft, ships and submarines, a duty that will be undertaken by the Tepe-class destroyers.

On 5 December 2007, the Defence Industry Executive Committee approved plans to build six ships of this class (4 fixed, 2 optional). In January 2013, it was announced that Turkey was planning to acquire a total of 8 Tepe-class destroyers, which was confirmed at the International Defence Industry Fair (IDEF) 2021. With the realization of the project, it is intended to improve the anti-air warfare (AAW) capabilities of the Turkish Navy.

==== Istanbul-class frigate ====
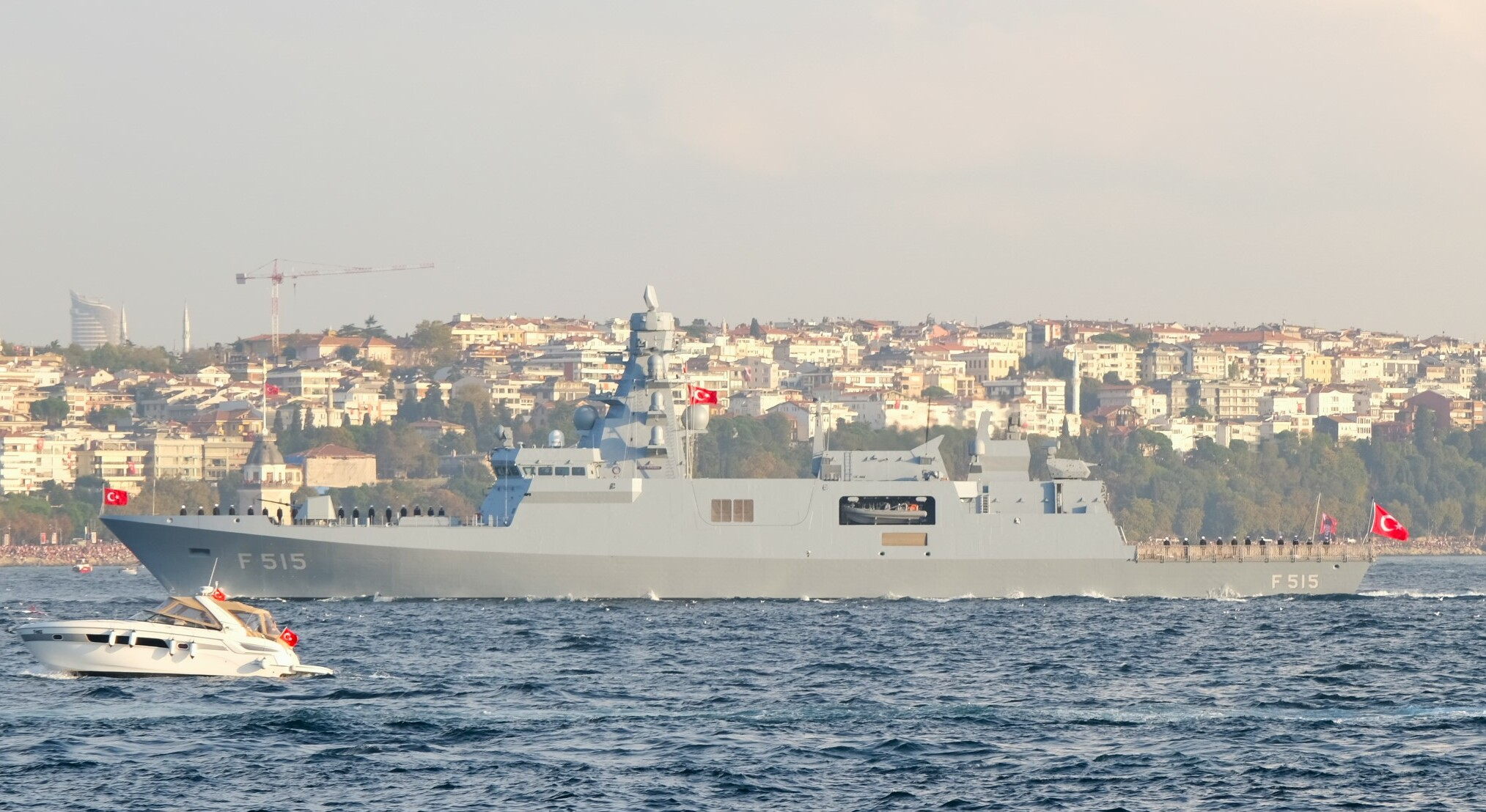
TCG Istanbul (F-515), the lead ship of the Istanbul-class frigates, at the Bosporus strait during the naval parade for celebrating the centenary of the Turkish Republic in 2023. Built as part of the MILGEM project, the Istanbul-class frigates use Turkish systems such as the Aselsan CENK 3D multi-beam AESA radar, Roketsan MiDLAS vertical launching system (VLS), Sapan SAM, SİPER SAM, and Atmaca SSM.

The Istanbul-class frigate programme was launched to construct four frigates to replace the aging Yavuz-class frigates in the mid-2020s. Developed under the MILGEM indigenous warship program, the Istanbul-class is an enlarged variant of the Ada-class anti-submarine warfare corvette. The Istanbul-class frigates will have around 50% increased fuel capacity and operational range capability compared to the Ada-class corvettes.

The first Istanbul-class frigate, TCG Istanbul (F-515) was launched on 23 January 2021. TCG Istanbul (F-515) was commissioned on 19 January 2024.

The Istanbul-class frigates use Turkish systems such as the Aselsan CENK 3D multi-beam AESA radar, Roketsan MİDLAS VLS, Sapan SAM, SİPER SAM, and Atmaca SSM.

==== Barbaros-class frigate modernisation ====
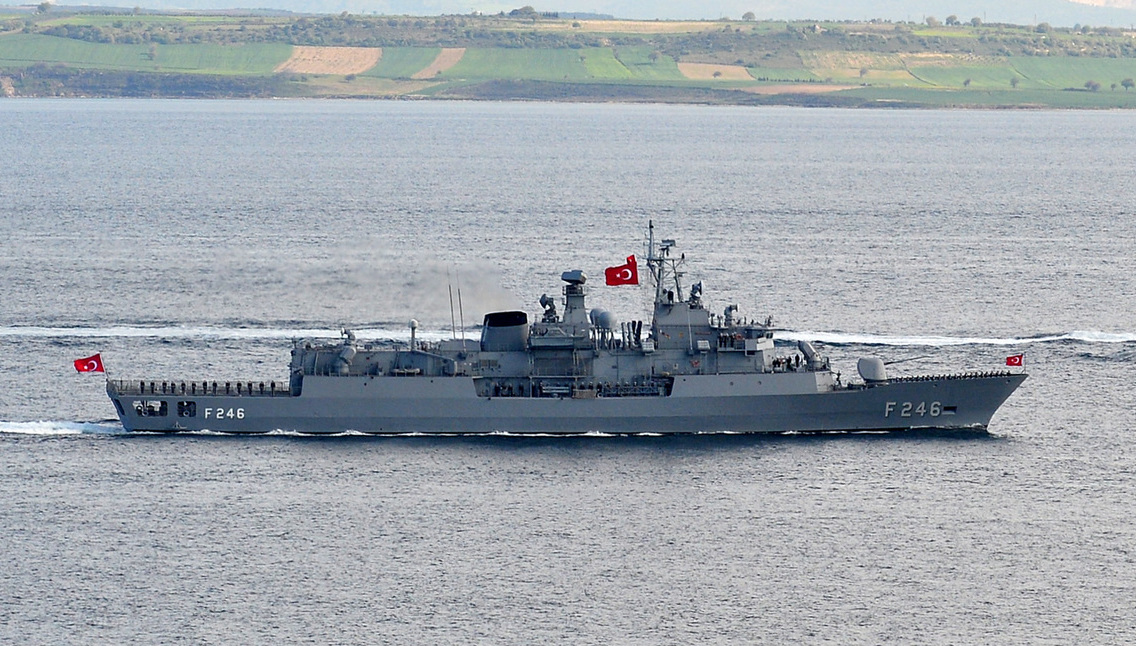
TCG Salihreis (F-246) at the Dardanelles strait during the centenary of the Gallipoli campaign in 2015. The upgraded Barbaros-class frigates are equipped with the SMART-S Mk2 3D radar and have two Mk. 41 Mod 8 VLS for 64 × RIM-162 ESSM and two Mk-141 launchers for 8 × RGM-84 Harpoon.

On 3 April 2018, a contract was signed between the Aselsan–HAVELSAN joint venture and the Undersecretariat for Defense Industries (SSM) regarding the mid-life upgrade project of the Barbaros-class frigates. The project includes the integration of new weapons systems, a new combat management system, and new radars and sensors; together with the replacement of the original mast with an integrated mast and various upgrades. All four ships in the class are included in this project. The project is scheduled to be completed by 2025.

The first two Barbaros-class vessels (F-244, F-245) have received an 8-cell Mk41 vertical launcher system (VLS) module, which replaced the obsolete Mk.29 Sea Sparrow launcher, while the slightly longer Salihreis-subclass vessels (F-246, F-247) have received a second 8-cell Mk 41 VLS module which brought the total number of cells to 16 (they can store a total of 64 RIM-162 ESSM missiles). Additionally, the old AWS-9 3D air search radars in all four vessels have been replaced by the SMART-S Mk2 3D radars.

The mid-life modernisation program also projects to enhance EW capabilities, double the number of anti-ship missiles that the vessels are equipped with, while also replacing the Harpoon missiles by the locally designed and produced Atmaca anti-ship missiles. The project also includes the substitution of the Oerlikon Sea Zenith CIWS systems with one Phalanx CIWS and one Aselsan Gökdeniz CIWS; the replacement of the existing TACTICOS combat management system with the Havelsan "B-SYS Combat Management System", and the installation of a 127mm main gun to the frigates. Finally, against asymmetric threats that the vessels may face, 2x2 L/UMTAS launchers will be integrated to the frigates.

==== G-class frigate modernisation ====
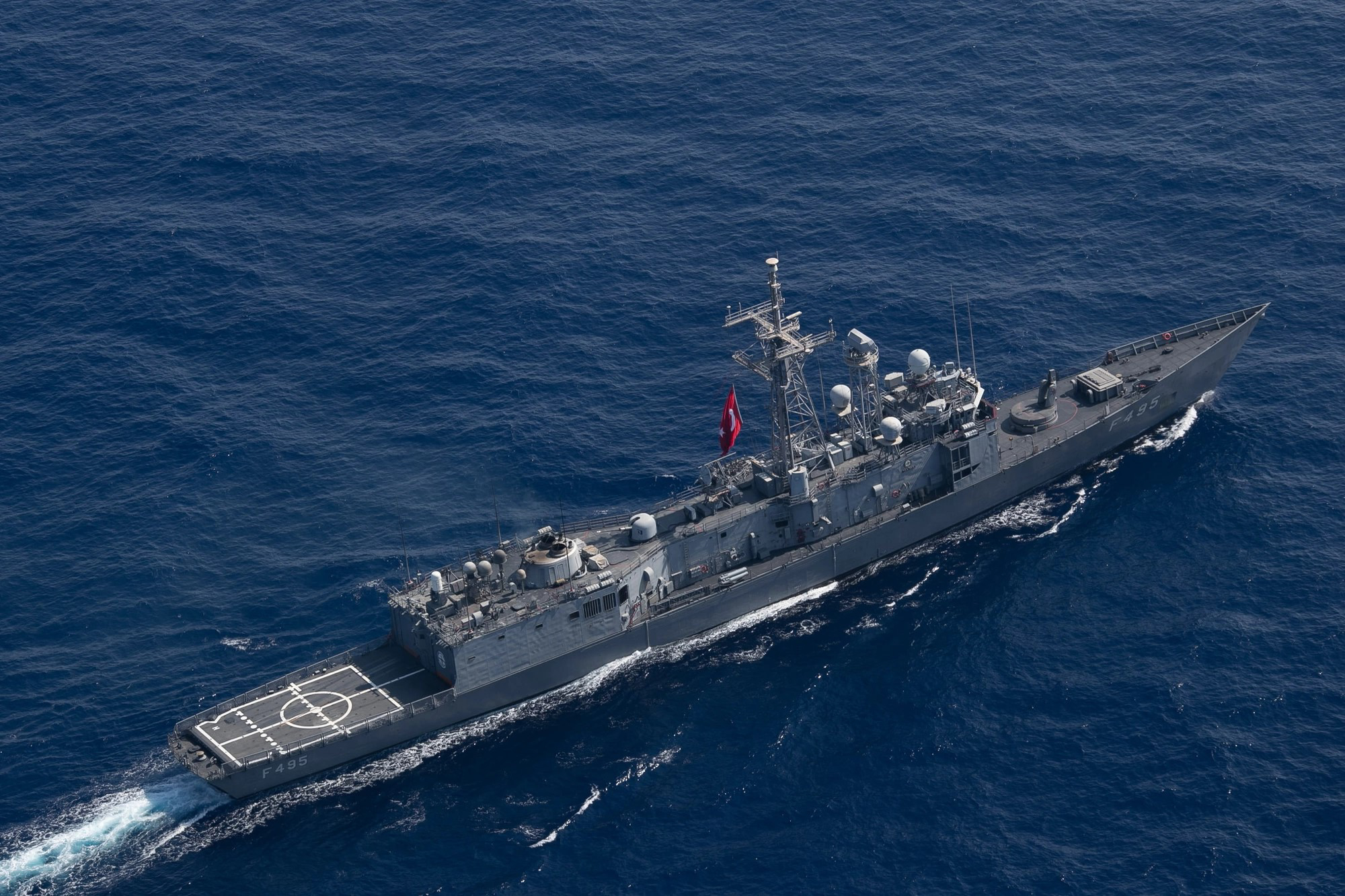
TCG Göksu (F-497) in the Mediterranean Sea on August 21, 2023. The G-class frigates are equipped with the GENESIS combat management system, SMART-S Mk2 3D radar and Mk. 41 VLS, which has been installed in front of the Mk. 13 GMLS.

The G-class frigates of the Turkish Navy have undergone a major modernisation program which included the retrofitting of a Turkish digital combat management system named GENESIS (Gemi Entegre Savaş İdare Sistemi). The system was designed and implemented jointly by the Turkish Navy and HAVELSAN, a Turkish electronic hardware systems and software company. The GENESIS upgraded ships were delivered between 2007 and 2011.

The GENESIS advanced combat management system has the capacity of tracking more than 1,000 tactical targets, thanks to its digital sensor data fusion, automatic threat evaluation, weapon engagement opportunities and Link-16/22 system integration.

The modernisation program also includes the addition of an 8-cell Mk.41 VLS for RIM-162 ESSM, together with the upgrade of the Mk-92 fire control system by Lockheed Martin; the retrofitting of the SMART-S Mk2 3D air search radar which replaced the AN/SPS-49; and the addition of a new long range sonar.

The Mk.41 vertical launching system (VLS) has been fitted in front of the Mk.13 launcher. TCG Gediz was the first ship in the class to receive the Mk.41 VLS installation.

The G-class frigates of the Turkish Navy were also modified with the ASIST landing platform system at the Istanbul Naval Shipyard, so that they can accommodate the S-70B-28 Seahawk helicopter in all types of weather conditions.

==== Ada-class corvette ====
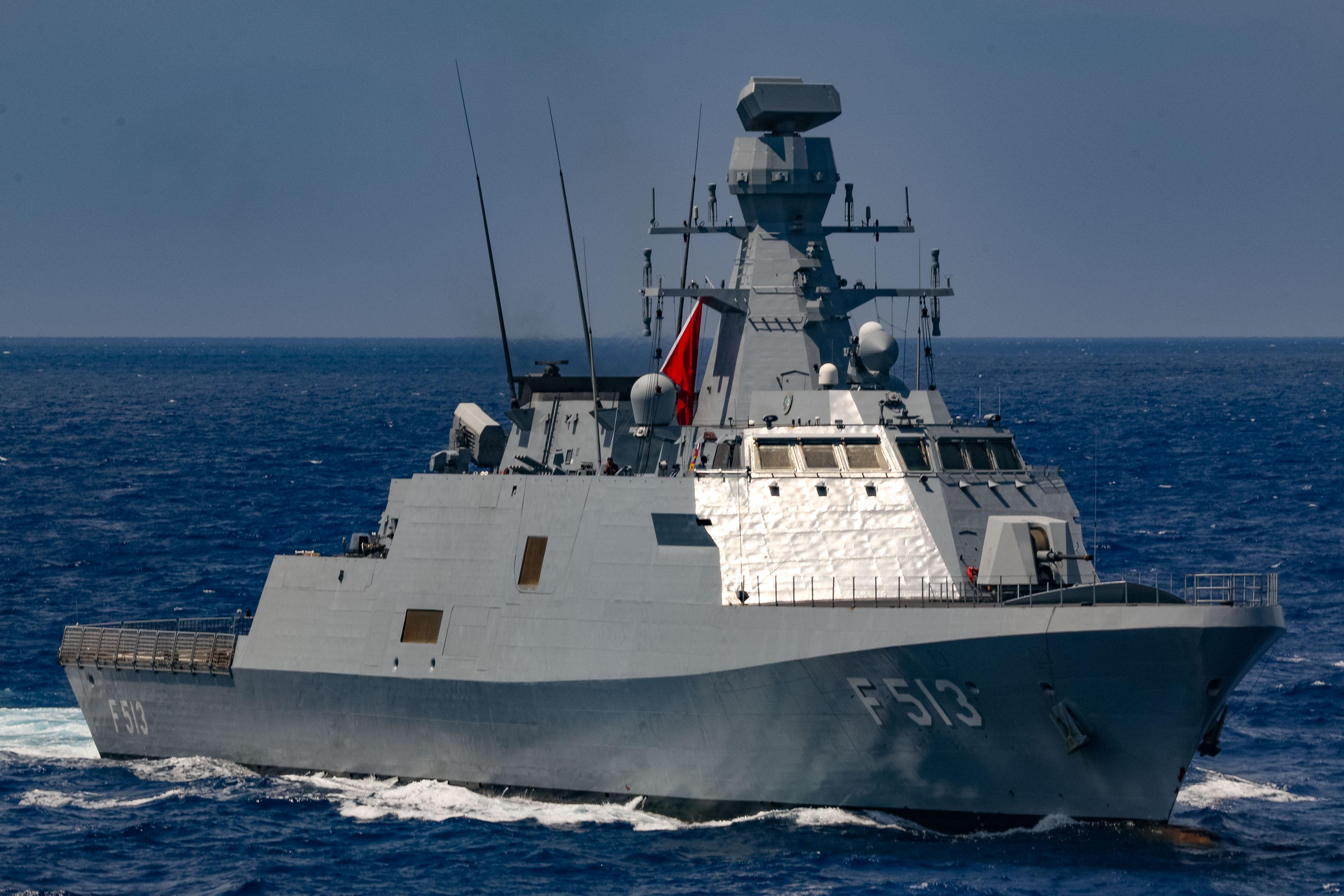
TCG Burgazada during a Turkish-American naval exercise in the Mediterranean Sea, August 26, 2020

The Ada-class corvettes of the Turkish Navy were developed during the first stage of the MILGEM project for the purpose of building a national corvette with anti-submarine warfare and high-seas patrol capabilities, while using the principles of low observability in its materials and design. The design concept and mission profile of the Ada-class corvette bears similarities to the Freedom-class littoral combat ship of the U.S. Navy. The Ada-class corvettes are more heavily armed and are equipped with more capable radar and sonar systems, while the Freedom-class has a higher speed and variable mission modules.

All four ships of the series, TCG Heybeliada, TCG Büyükada, TCG Burgazada and TCG Kınalıada were built by the Istanbul Naval Shipyard. The construction works of the lead ship, TCG Heybeliada, commenced on 26 July 2005. TCG Heybeliada was launched on 27 September 2008. On 2 November 2010, Heybeliada initiated sea acceptance trials in the Sea of Marmara. Heybeliada entered service on 27 September 2011. The cost of constructing TCG Heybeliada was reportedly around US$260 million. The production of the second ship of the class, TCG Büyükada, commenced on 27 September 2008. Büyükada was expected to incorporate weapon systems with notable performance, such as the ASELSAN air-search radar. Büyükada was launched on 27 September 2011 and underwent sea acceptance trials before it was officially commissioned on 27 September 2013. The construction of TCG Burgazada commenced on 17 December 2014. The ship was launched in June 2016 and commissioned on 4 November 2018. Turkish Naval Forces Command (TNFC) received its fourth and last Ada-class corvette, TCG Kınalıada (F-514) on 29 September 2019, in the commissioning ceremony held at the Istanbul Naval Shipyard. On 4 November 2019, the Defense Industries Administration (SSB) of Turkey announced that TCG Kınalıada successfully test-fired the Atmaca anti-ship cruise missile.

GENESIS (Gemi Entegre Savaş İdare Sistemi, i.e., Ship Integrated Combat Management System), a network-centric warfare management system developed by HAVELSAN and initially used in the upgraded G-class frigates of the Turkish Navy, was contracted for the first two corvettes on 23 May 2007. In the last Ada-class corvette, TCG Kınalıada, the ADVENT combat management system (an upgraded version of GENESIS) was installed. TCG Burgazada will also be retrofitted with the ADVENT combat management system. Ada-class corvettes have a national hull-mounted sonar developed by the Scientific and Technological Research Council of Turkey. The sonar dome has been developed by STM's subcontractor ONUK-BG Defence Systems, extensively employing nano-enhanced fibre-reinforced polymer. The Ada-class also features the Electronic Chart Precise Integrated Navigation System (ECPINS), supplied by OSI Geospatial. The Integrated Platform Management System (IPMS) for controlling machinery, auxiliary systems, power generation and distribution was delivered by STM's subcontractor Yaltes JV. The main systems integrated to IPMS are the power management system, fire detection system, fire fighting system, damage control system, CCTV system and stability control system.

TCG Ufuk (A-591) SIGINT ship and Hisar-class OPVs are variants of the Ada-class corvette that use the same hull and superstructure design but feature different types of systems, armament and equipment.

==== Atılay-class submarine ====
The Atılay-class (MILDEN) submarine (Turkish: Milli Denizaltı Projesi; English: "National Submarine Project") is a multi-year military design and procurement project to develop indigenous air-independent power attack submarines, intended to be commissioned into the Turkish Naval Forces in the 2030s. The first MILDEN class submarine is being designed and built at the Gölcük Naval Shipyard, where the concept design was completed in 2022, and the preliminary design phase, in which the main and auxiliary systems will be elaborated in detail, began in September 2022.

Atılay-class submarine is a diesel-electric submarine of approximately 2,700 tonnes displacement, and over 80 metres (260 ft) in length.

The construction of the first Atılay-class submarine started on 2 January 2025.

==== Reis-class submarine ====
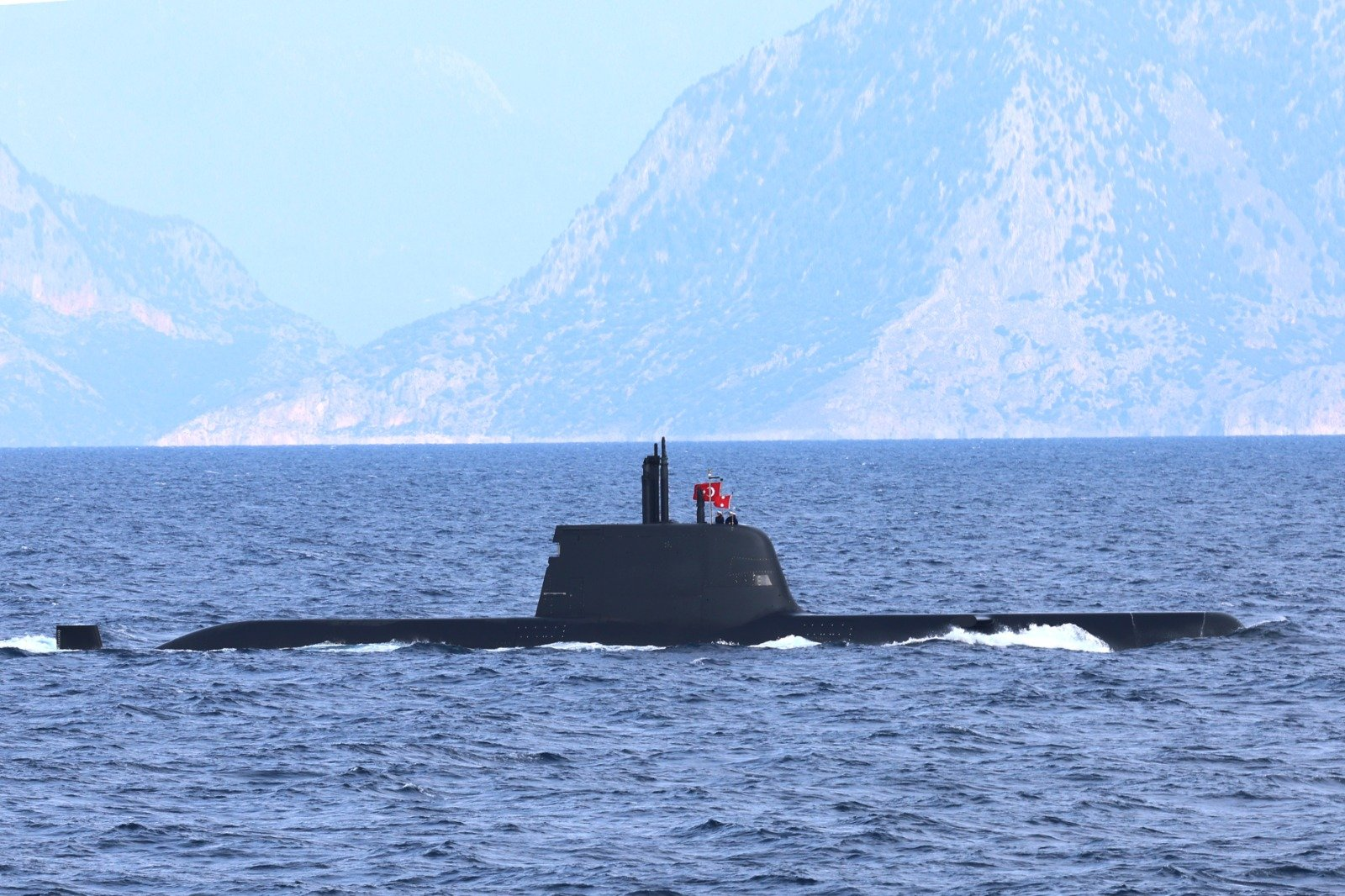
TCG Piri Reis (S-330) during the Mavi Vatan 2025 exercise of the Turkish Naval Forces, January 8, 2025

The Reis-class submarines are the first submarines in the Turkish Naval Forces with air-independent propulsion (AIP), which is made possible by fuel cell technology. The submarines can also deploy heavyweight torpedoes and anti-ship missiles, and lay mines against targets, both at sea and on land.

Apart from Piri Reis, five more submarines of the project are expected to be commissioned by 2027. The sea trials of the first submarine of the class, Piri Reis, began on 6 December 2022. TCG Piri Reis (S-330) was commissioned on 24 August 2024. The outfitting of the project's second submarine Hızır Reis and the hull production phases of two other vessels are ongoing.

In 2015, Gölcük Naval Shipyard commenced a 10-year programme to build six Type 214 submarines, locally known as the Reis-class submarines, with technology from Thyssen-Krupp Marine Systems of Germany.

==== Preveze-class submarine modernisation ====
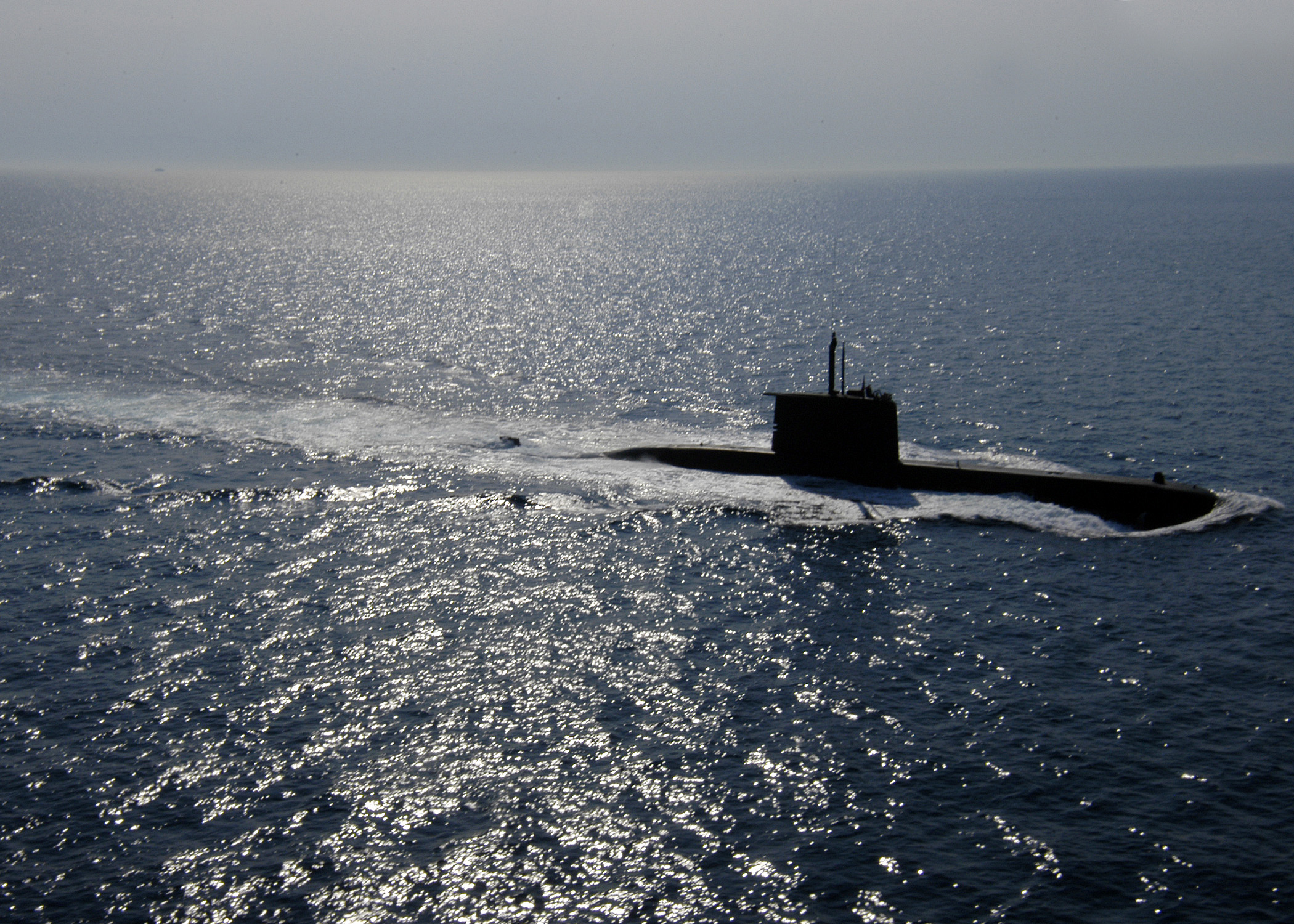
TCG Preveze (S-353) surfaces at the Gulf of Taranto during the NATO exercise Sorbet Royal 2005

The Half-life Modernisation Project of the Preveze-class submarines covered the modernisation of TCG Preveze (S-353), TCG Sakarya (S-354), TCG 18 Mart (S-355) and TCG Anafartalar (S-356) in the inventory of the Turkish Naval Forces Command. The modernisation activities were carried out by the STM-ASELSAN-HAVELSAN-ASFAT partnership.

The Inertial Navigation System, Salinity-Depth-Density Measurement System, Floating Antenna, Satellite Communication Mast, Assault and Navigation Periscope System, Emergency Underwater Communication System, Cooled Water System, Static Converter and Air Freshening System of the Preveze-class submarines were modernised by STM.

=== Aircraft, UAVs & UCAVs ===
==== ATR 72-500 ASW / ATR 72-600 TMUA / ATR 72-600 TMPA ====
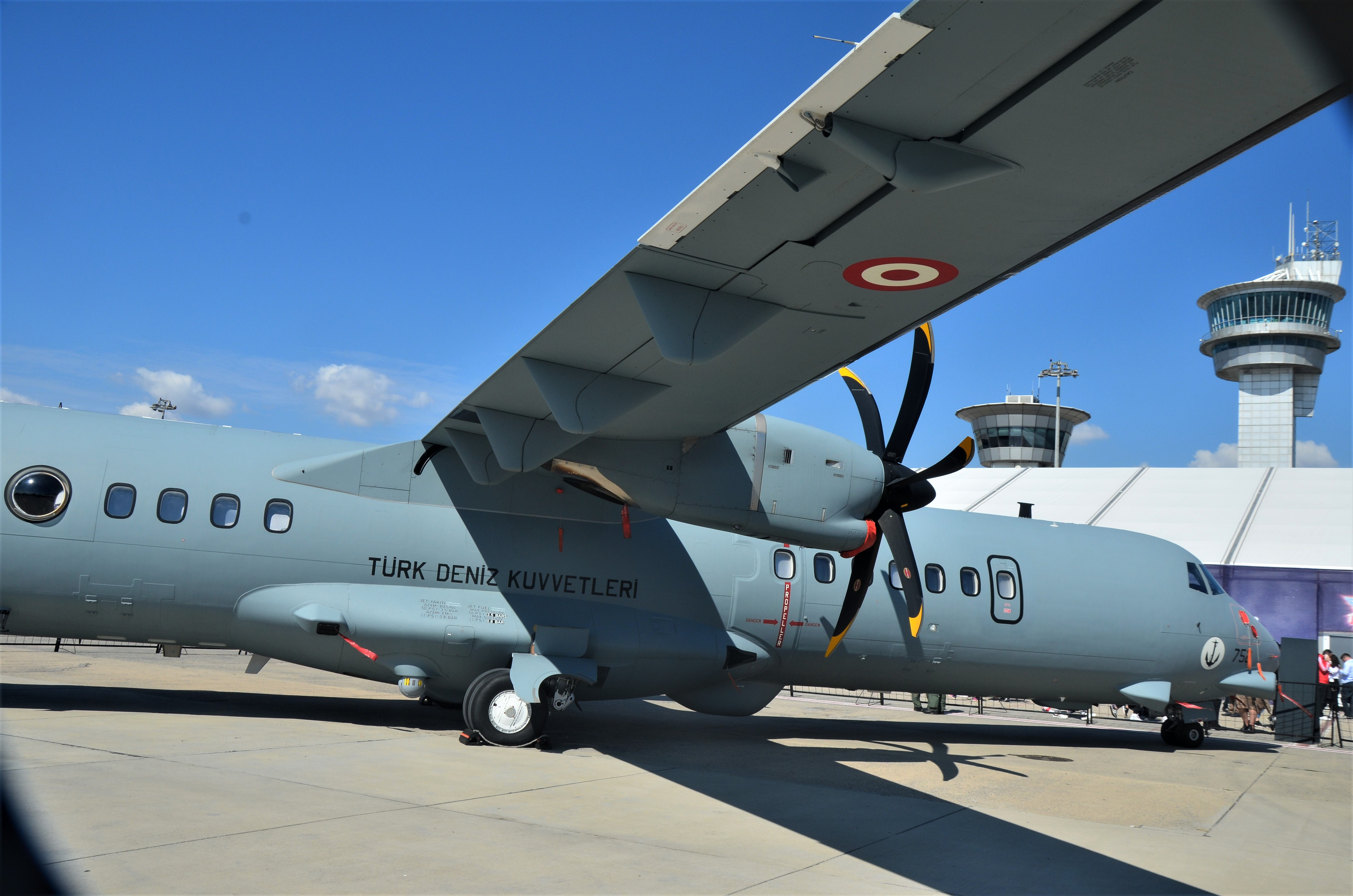
An ATR 72-600 TMPA of the Turkish Navy

The Turkish Navy has purchased ten ATR 72-500 ASW (Anti-Submarine Warfare), two ATR 72-600 TMUA (Turkish Maritime Utility Aircraft), and six ATR 72-600 TMPA (Turkish Maritime Patrol Aircraft) variants of the ATR 72 aircraft produced by EADS and Alenia Aermacchi of the Leonardo group of companies, with systems integration by Thales and Turkish Aerospace Industries.

==== Bayraktar TB2 UCAV ====
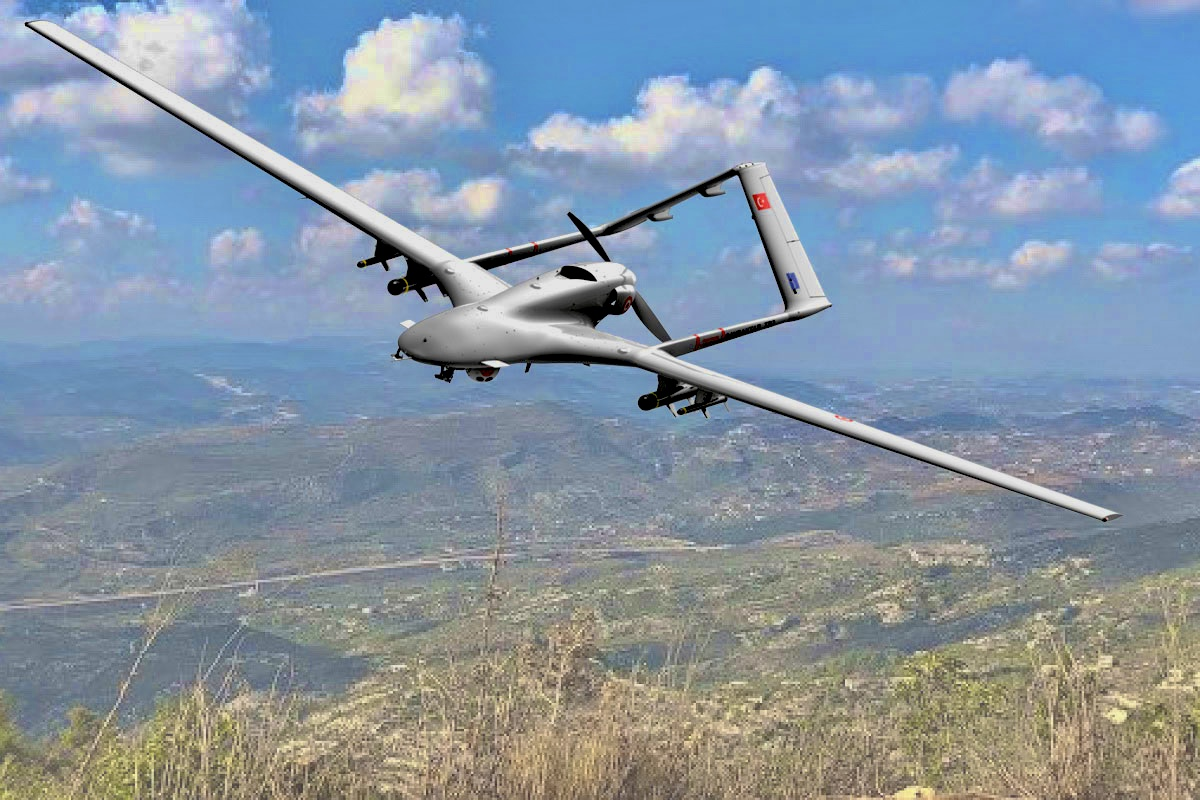
Bayraktar TB2 UCAV

The Bayraktar TB2 is one of the primary unmanned combat aerial vehicles (UCAVs) operated by the Turkish Naval Forces for intelligence, surveillance, reconnaissance (ISR), maritime patrol and precision strike missions. Naval TB2 operations are integrated into Turkey's broader unmanned naval aviation doctrine alongside the TCG Anadolu (L-400) amphibious assault ship and other indigenous UAV systems.

The platform has been used in maritime reconnaissance, target acquisition and naval exercise scenarios in the Aegean Sea, Eastern Mediterranean and Black Sea regions.

==== Bayraktar TB3 UCAV ====
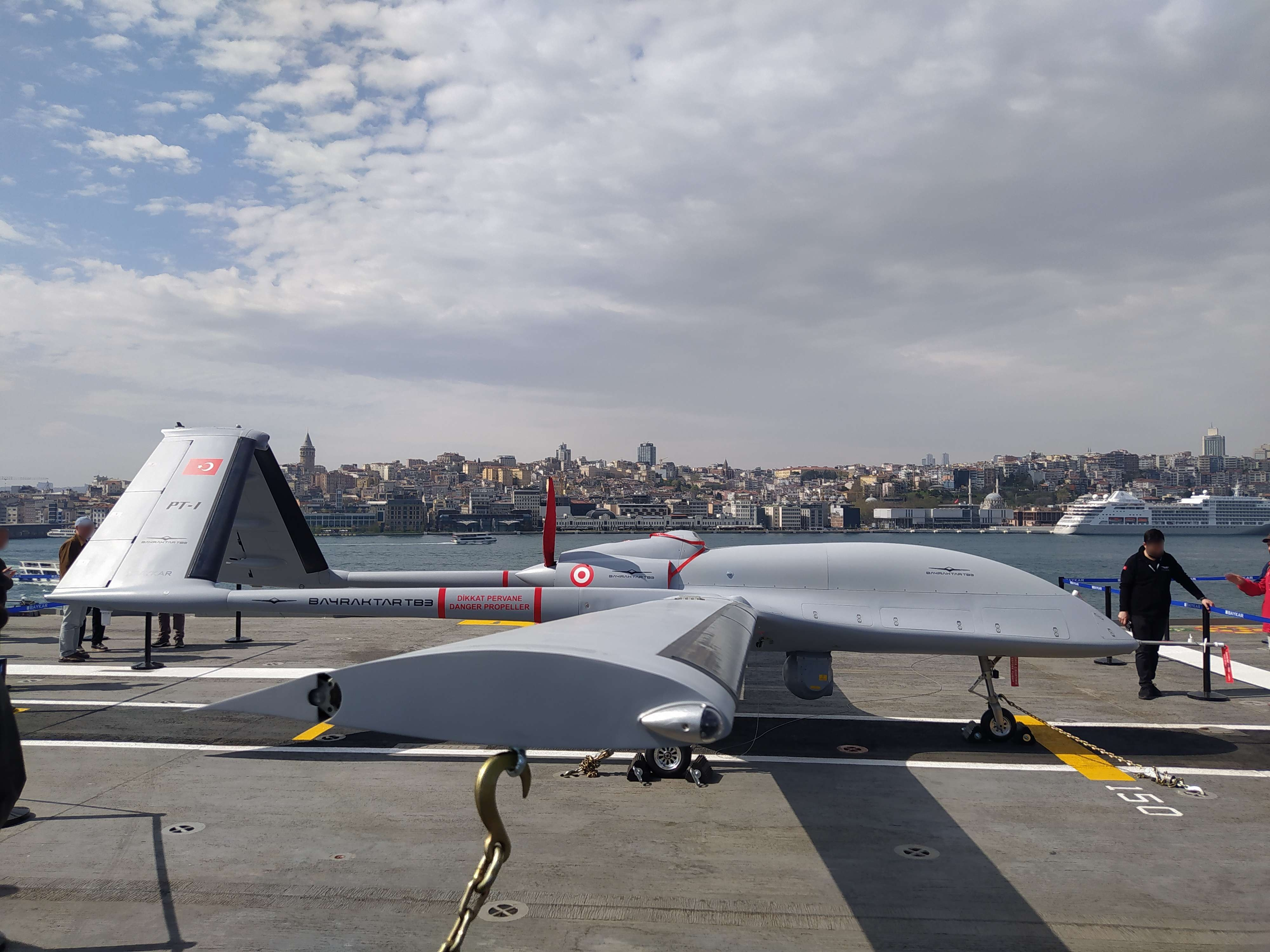
A Baykar Bayraktar TB3 UCAV on the flight deck of TCG Anadolu (L-400) in Istanbul, April 17, 2023.

In February 2021, chairman of the Presidency of Defense Industries (SSB) Ismail Demir made public a new type of UAV being developed by Baykar that is planned to be stationed to Turkey's first drone-carrying amphibious assault ship, TCG Anadolu. The new aircraft being developed is a naval version of the Bayraktar TB2 equipped with a local engine developed by TEI. According to the initial plans the ship was expected to be equipped with F-35B fighter jets but following the removal of Turkey from the procurement program, the vessel got into a modification process to be able to accommodate UAVs. Mr. Demir stated that between 30 and 50 folding-winged Bayraktar TB3 UAVs will be able to land and take off using the deck of Anadolu.

On 19 November 2024, a Baykar Bayraktar TB3 UCAV successfully took-off from the flight deck of TCG Anadolu and landed on the ship. It was the first time a fixed-wing unmanned aircraft of this size and class had successfully landed on a short-runway landing helicopter dock, without the use of an arresting gear.

==== Project MIUS: Bayraktar Kızılelma UCAV and TAI Anka-3 UCAV ====
Bayraktar Kızılelma fighter drone and the flying wing type TAI Anka-3 strike drone are the two jet-powered, low-observable UCAVs developed as part of Project MIUS for the Turkish Navy and the Turkish Air Force.

The jet-powered, low-observable Bayraktar Kızılelma UCAV is specifically designed to operate on TCG Anadolu. Its first flight was completed on 14 December 2022.

TAI Anka-3's first flight took place on 28 December 2023. On 30 October 2024, a TAI Anka-3 UCAV armed with a cruise missile became the first drone in history to be controlled by another aircraft in the loyal wingman role, representing an advancement in remote control capabilities for military aviation. On 13 January 2025, a TAI Anka-3 successfully completed a strike mission test with internal munitions such as the Tolun bomb.

==== TAI Anka UCAV ====
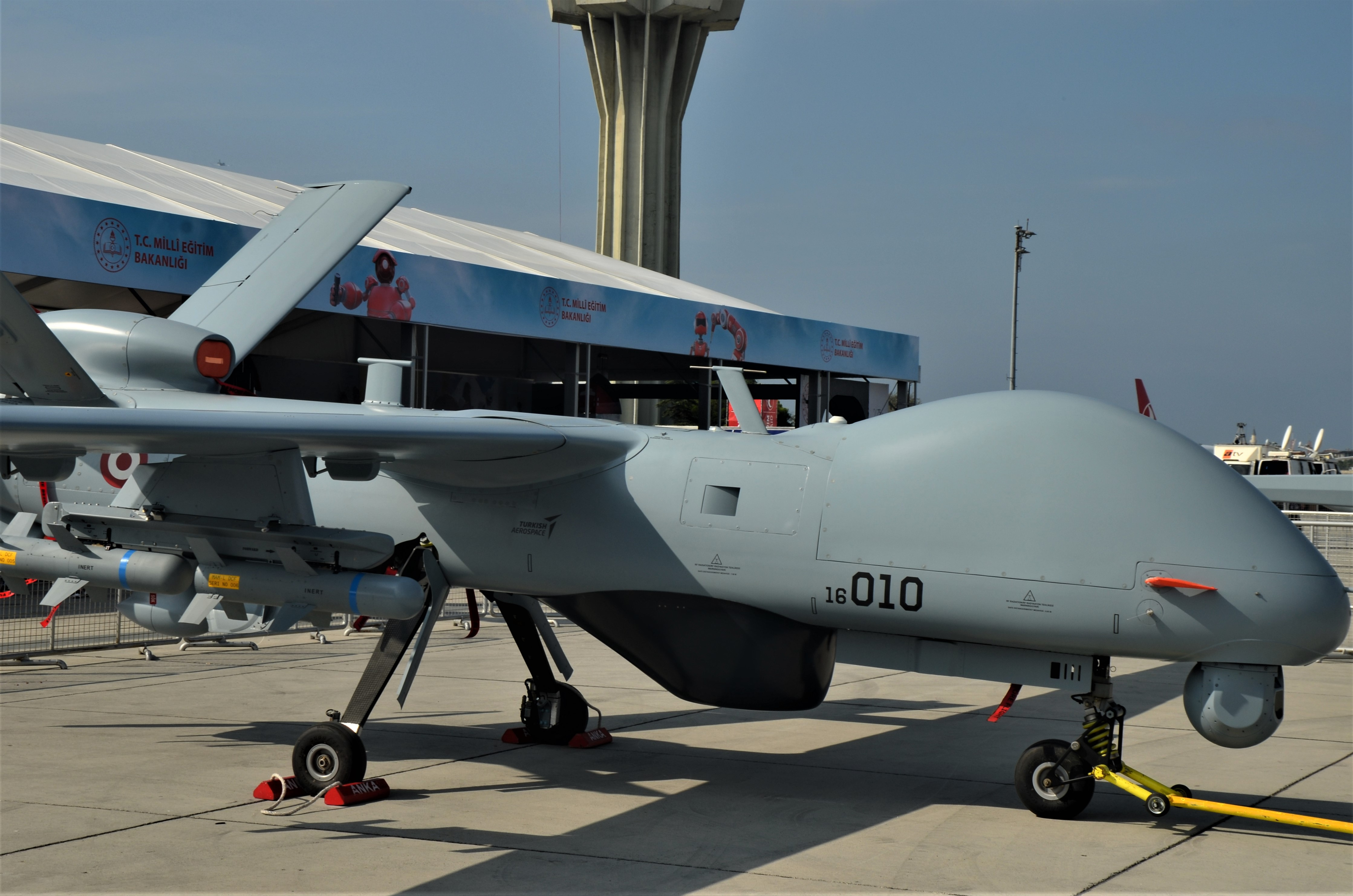
TAI Anka UCAV

The TAI Anka unmanned aerial vehicle family is operated by the Turkish Naval Forces in intelligence, surveillance, reconnaissance and maritime patrol roles. Naval aviation units operate both the Anka-B and satellite-controlled Anka-S variants for long-endurance ISR missions and operational support.

The Anka fleet is used for maritime domain awareness, coastal surveillance and support of naval task groups during exercises and operational deployments.

==== TAI Aksungur UCAV ====
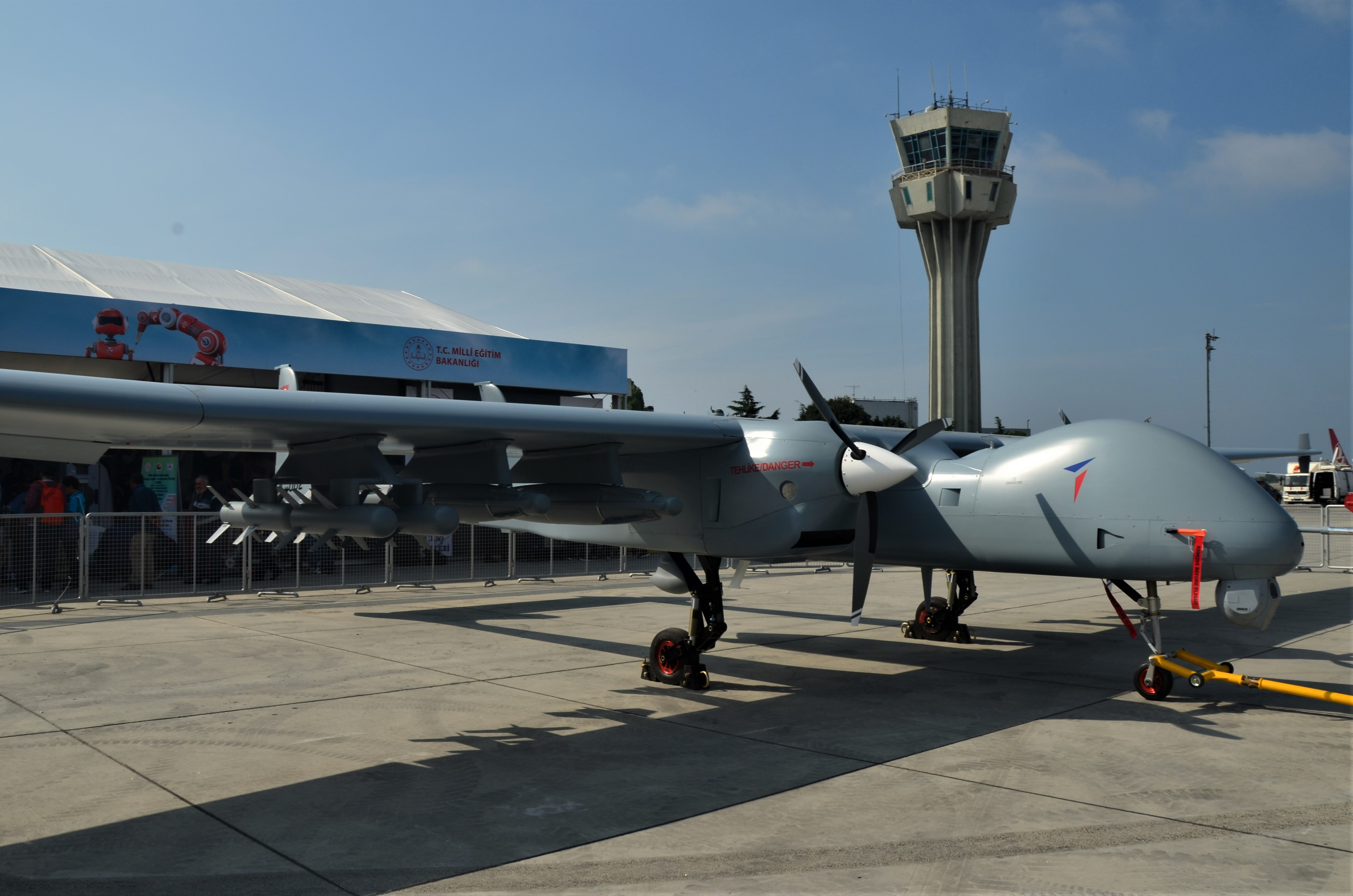
TAI Aksungur UCAV

The TAI Aksungur is a twin-engine long-endurance UCAV developed by Turkish Aerospace Industries for intelligence, surveillance, reconnaissance and maritime strike missions.

The Turkish Naval Forces inducted the Aksungur into service during the early 2020s for maritime patrol and anti-surface warfare support missions. Aircraft with the tail numbers TCB-881, TCB-882 and TCB-884 were delivered to naval aviation units between 2021 and 2023.

The aircraft is capable of carrying electro-optical systems, maritime surveillance radars, sonobuoys and precision-guided munitions for extended over-water operations.

==== STM TOGAN ====
The STM TOGAN is a rotary-wing tactical mini UAV developed by STM for autonomous reconnaissance and surveillance missions. The system has been evaluated and used by various branches of the Turkish Armed Forces, including naval and amphibious units, during tactical reconnaissance exercises and field operations.

==== HAVELSAN BAHA ====
The HAVELSAN BAHA is a sub-cloud autonomous vertical take-off and landing (VTOL) UAV designed by HAVELSAN for tactical reconnaissance, surveillance and intelligence missions.

Although primarily associated with Turkish Land Forces units, the BAHA system is part of the broader Turkish Armed Forces unmanned systems ecosystem and has been demonstrated for joint and amphibious operational support roles.

=== USVs ===
==== ULAQ ====
ULAQ is the first indigenous and locally developed Armed Unmanned Surface Vehicle (AUSV). The vehicle is being developed by a joint venture between Ares Shipyard and METEKSAN. The vessel is planned to be equipped with four Cirit and two L-UMTAS anti-tank missile systems provided by Roketsan. Moreover, ULAQ is projected to have a 400-kilometer-long cruising range with 65 km per hour maximum speed. The vessel is planned to be operated in missions such as reconnaissance, surveillance and intelligence, surface warfare, asymmetric warfare, armed escort and force protection, and strategic facility security. Currently, the project is undergoing sea trials and will start to fire tests through the third quarter of 2021. The first firing test of the vessel was completed on 26 May 2021 by destroying a designated target with the Roketsan Cirit missile.

==== TCB Marlin ====
With a ceremony held on 9 January 2024, she entered service in the Turkish Naval Forces as the first UCSV (unmanned combat surface vessel) with the hull number TCB-1101 and name Marlin SİDA.

==== SANCAR ====
The SANCAR is an armed unmanned surface vehicle (AUSV) developed by HAVELSAN and Yonca-Onuk Shipyard. It entered service with the Turkish Naval Forces in February 2026.

The vessel is integrated with the ADVENT combat management system architecture and is designed for intelligence, surveillance and reconnaissance (ISR), anti-surface warfare (ASuW), force protection and mine countermeasure support missions.

==== SALVO ====
The SALVO is a tactical unmanned surface vehicle developed by UNIROBOTICS and SYS Grup for reconnaissance, surveillance and armed patrol missions. The platform has been presented in armed configurations equipped with remotely controlled weapon stations, including variants armed with the M2 Browning heavy machine gun.

==== ALBATROS-S ====
The ALBATROS-S is a swarm-capable unmanned surface vehicle developed by ASELSAN for asymmetric naval warfare and coordinated autonomous attack missions.

The system has been tested in coordinated swarm exercises involving multiple USVs and Baykar Bayraktar TB3 UCAVs operating from TCG Anadolu (L-400).

==== MİR ====
MİR is an experimental unmanned surface vehicle associated with Turkish swarm USV development efforts. The platform was publicly observed during ASELSAN-led swarm USV demonstrations alongside the ALBATROS-S system.

=== UUVs ===
==== STM NETA ====
The STM NETA family is a series of autonomous unmanned underwater vehicles (UUVs) developed by STM for mine countermeasure (MCM), reconnaissance and underwater surveillance missions.

The NETA 300 variant is designed for operations at depths of up to 300 metres and endurance missions of up to 24 hours. STM announced that the system was developed primarily for mine detection and underwater reconnaissance missions for the Turkish Naval Forces.

==== TENGIZ ====
The TENGIZ is an extra-large unmanned underwater vehicle (XLUUV) concept developed by STM for long-endurance deep-water missions. The platform was publicly presented during SAHA Expo 2026 as part of Turkey's expanding autonomous underwater warfare ecosystem.

==== KILIÇ Series ====
The Kiliç UUV series consists of autonomous unmanned underwater attack vehicles developed by ASELSAN.

The family includes the portable Aselsan Kılıç 10 and the longer-range Aselsan Kılıç 200 variants for asymmetric underwater warfare missions against surface and underwater targets.

==== Deringöz ====
The Deringöz family consists of autonomous underwater vehicles developed by ASELSAN for underwater reconnaissance, inspection and surveillance missions.

Variants including Deringöz 300 and Deringöz 600 are designed for deep-water operations with modular sensor payloads and underwater imaging systems.

== Istanbul Naval Museum ==
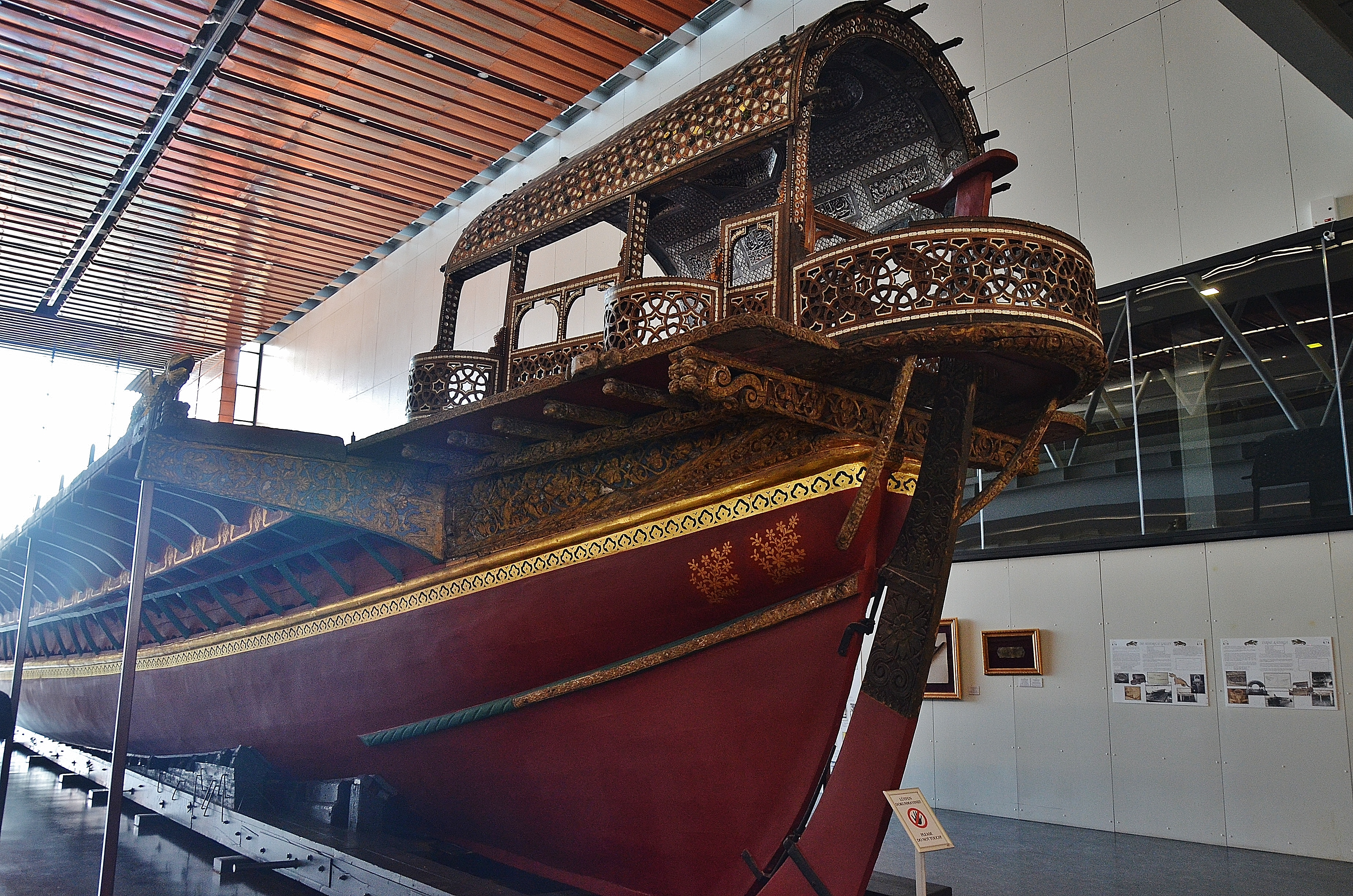
Late 16th or early 17th century Ottoman galley known as Tarihi Kadırga at the Istanbul Naval Museum, built in the period between the reigns of Sultan Murad III (1574–1595) and Sultan Mehmed IV (1648–1687), as evidenced by AMS radiocarbon dating and dendrochronological research. She is the only surviving original galley in the world, with the oldest continuously maintained wooden hull.

The Istanbul Naval Museum is located in the Beşiktaş district of Istanbul, Turkey. It was established in 1897 by the Ottoman Minister of the Navy (Bahriye Nazırı) Bozcaadalı Hasan Hüsnü Pasha.

The museum contains an important collection of military artifacts pertaining to the Ottoman Navy. In the maritime field, it is Turkey's largest museum, with a great variety of collections. Around 20,000 pieces are present in its collection, including the late 16th or early 17th century Ottoman Navy galley known as Tarihi Kadırga, built in the period between the reigns of Sultan Murad III (1574–1595) and Sultan Mehmed IV (1648–1687), as evidenced by AMS radiocarbon dating and dendrochronological research. She is the only surviving original galley in the world, and has the world's oldest continuously maintained wooden hull.

Being connected to the Turkish Naval Forces Command, it is also the country's first military museum.

In the early 21st century a new exhibition building was constructed. The construction began in 2008, and the building was reopened on 4 October 2013. It has two floors above ground level and one basement floor, all covering 20,000 m^{2} (220,000 sq ft).

The basement consists of diverse items like figureheads, ornaments of naval ships, ship models, and pieces of the Byzantine chain that was used for blocking the entrance of the Golden Horn during the Ottoman conquest of Constantinople (Istanbul) in 1453. In the first and second floors, a large number of imperial and other caïques are exhibited.

Many exhibition items underwent special restoration and conservation works due to deformation of the raw materials caused by heat, light, humidity, atmospheric conditions, vandalism and other factors.

== Insignia ==
NATO code	OF-10	OF-9	OF-8	OF-7	OF-6	OF-5	OF-4	OF-3	OF-2	OF-1
Turkish Naval Forces
Turkish Naval Forces	Büyük amiral	Oramiral	Koramiral	Tümamiral	Tuğamiral	Albay	Yarbay	Binbaşı	Yüzbaşı	Üsteğmen	Teğmen	Asteğmen

NATO code	OR-9	OR-8	OR-7	OR-6	OR-5			OR-4		OR-3		OR-2	OR-1
Turkish Naval Forces													No insignia
Turkish Naval Forces	Astsubay kıdemli başçavuş	Astsubay başçavuş	Astsubay kıdemli üstçavuş	Astsubay üstçavuş	Astsubay kıdemli çavuş	Astsubay çavuş	Astsubay astçavuş	Uzman çavuş	Çavuş	Uzman onbaşı	Onbaşı		Er

- Non-Turkish speakers might like to know that OF3, OF2, and OR2 literally translates as "Head of 1000", "Head of 100", and "Head of 10", respectively.

== Gallery ==
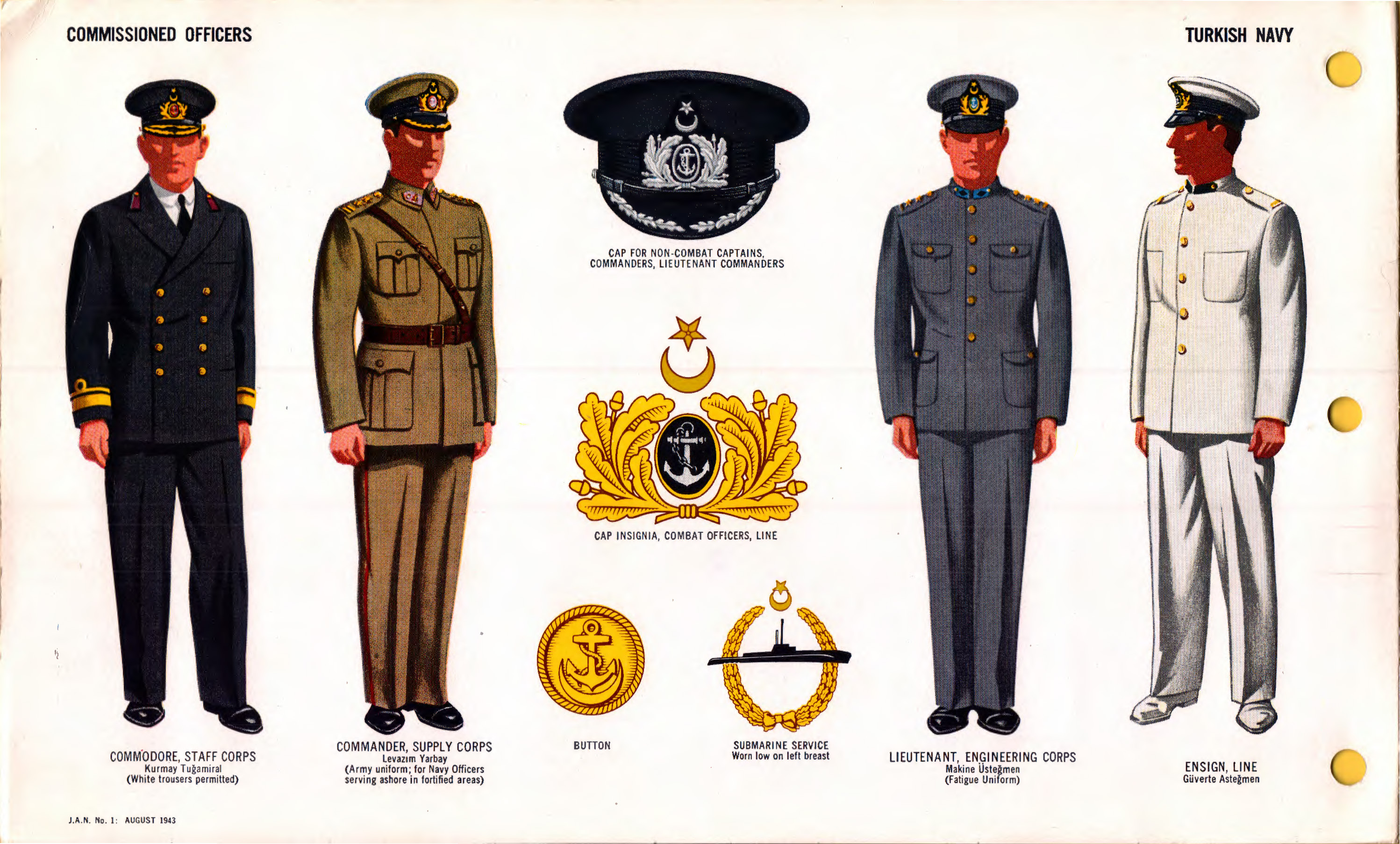
Uniforms and Insignia of the Turkish Navy during World War II - CO.

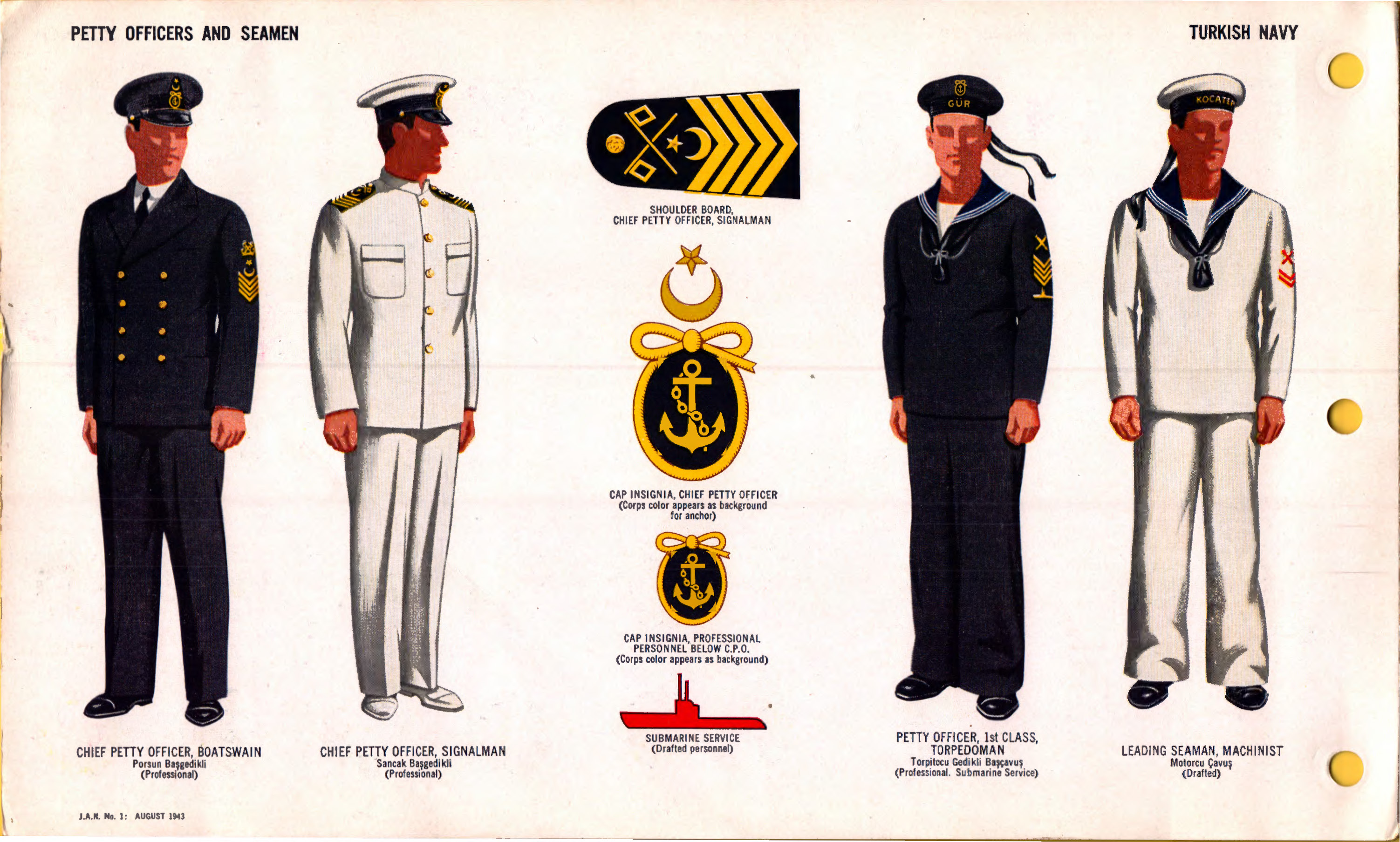
Uniforms and Insignia of the Turkish Navy during World War II - NCO.

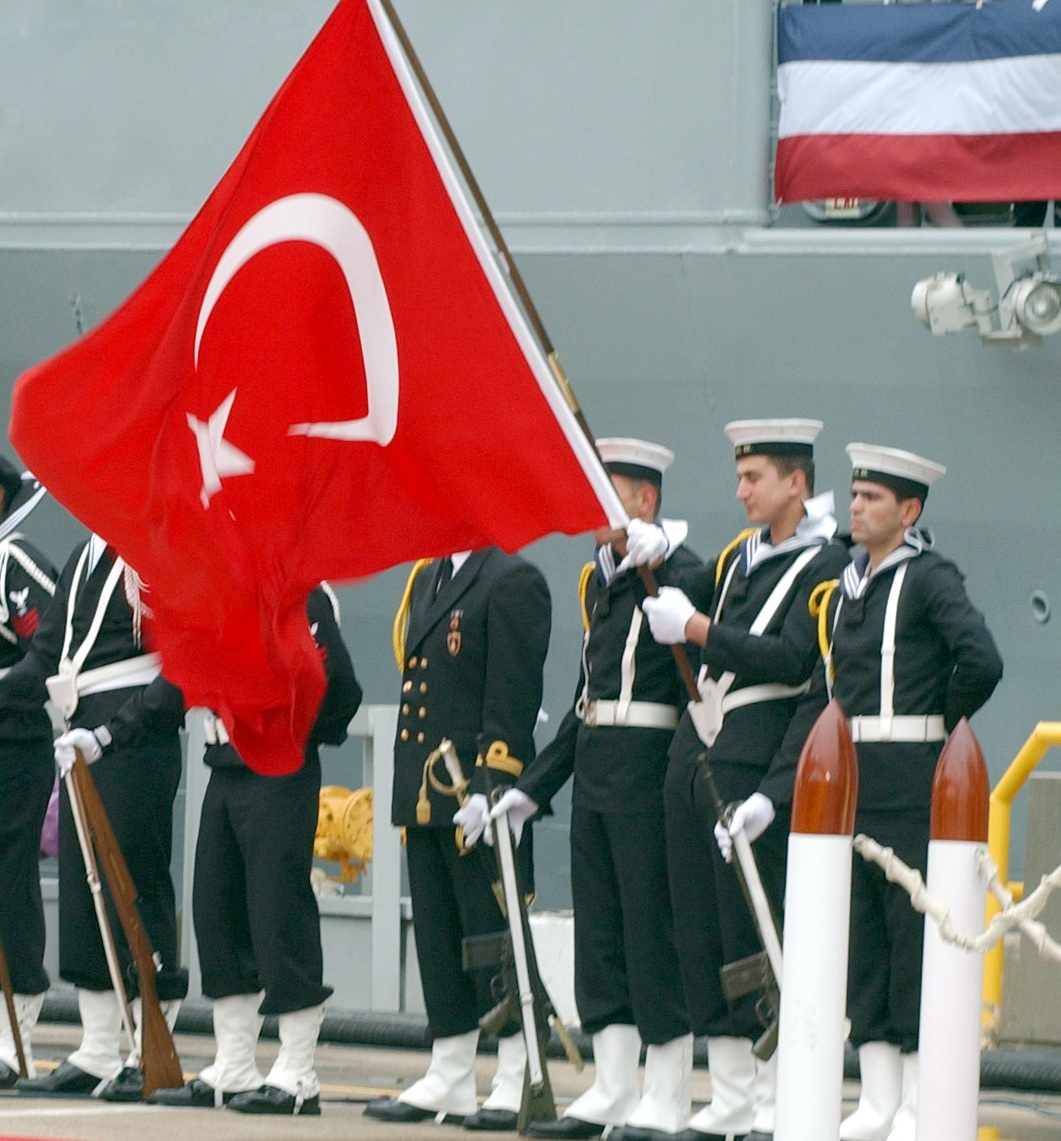
Officers and seamen of the Turkish Navy on April 10, 2002.

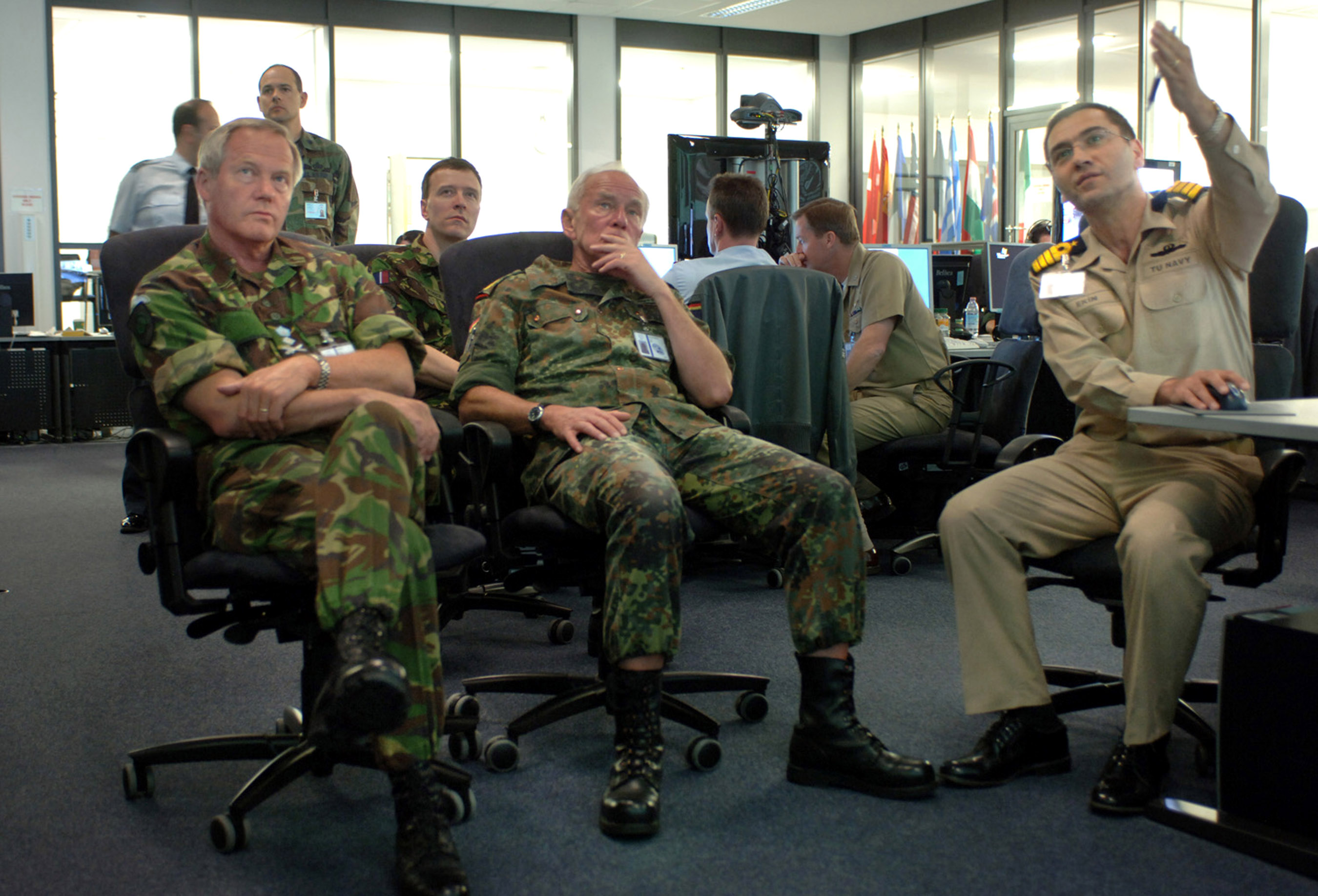
Gen. Sir John Reith (U.K.) and Gen. Ranier Shuwirth (Germany) receiving an operations brief by Turkish Naval Capt. Cengiz Ekin on May 3, 2007.

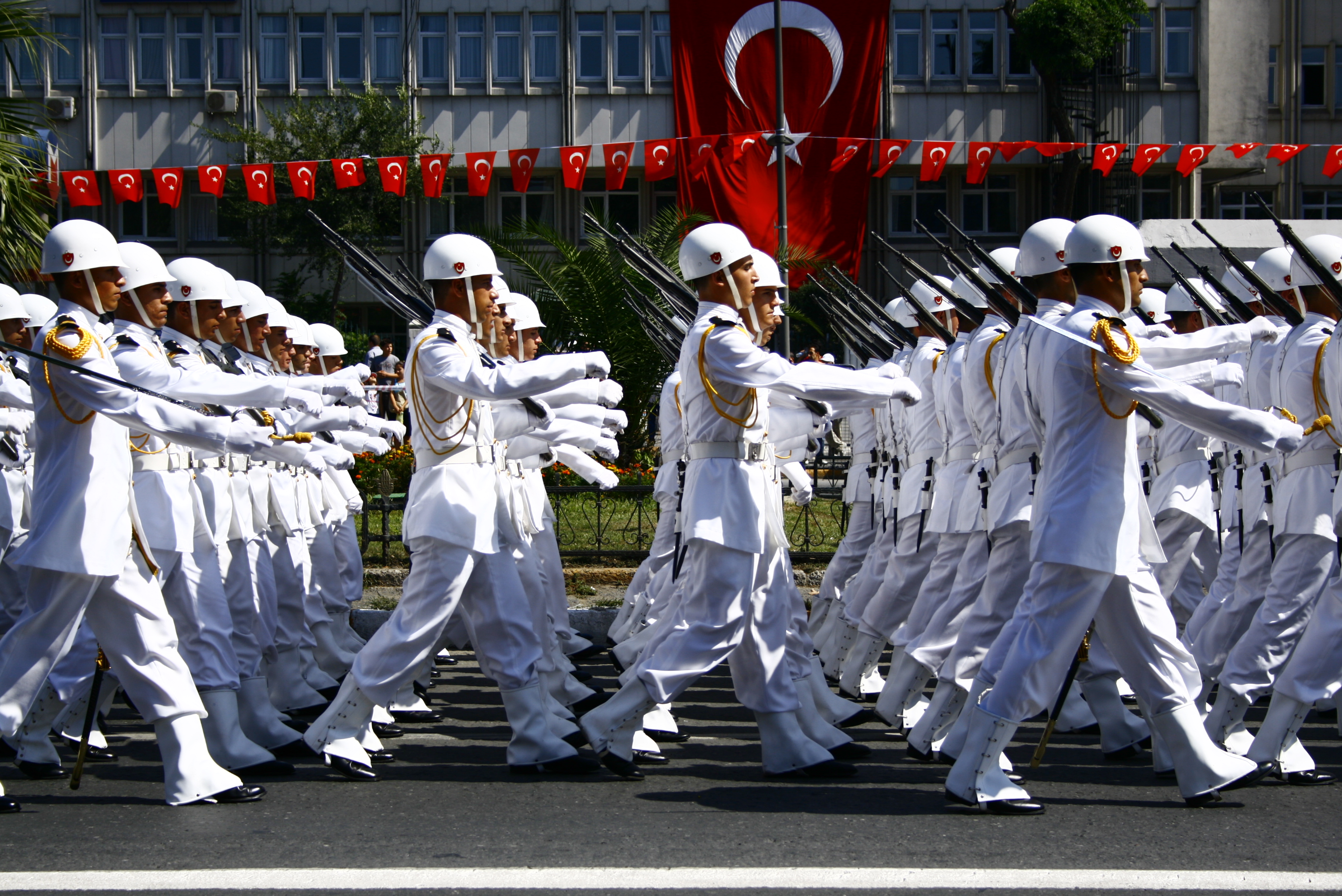
Navy Ceremonial Guard during the Victory Day celebrations on August 30, 2007.

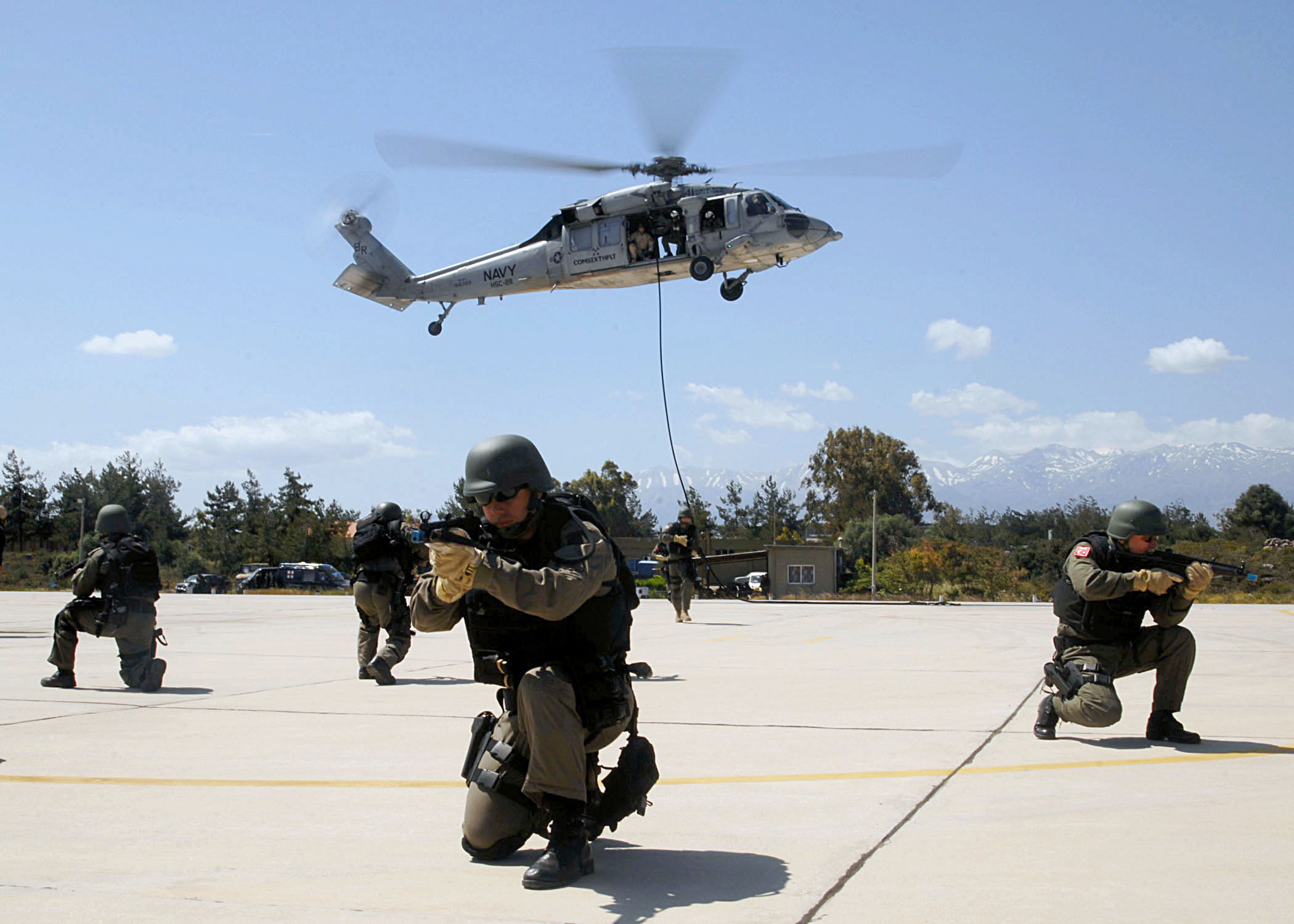
Turkish SAT commandos perform fast-rope exercises from a U.S. Navy MH-60S Sea Hawk helicopter during exercise Phoenix Express 2009.

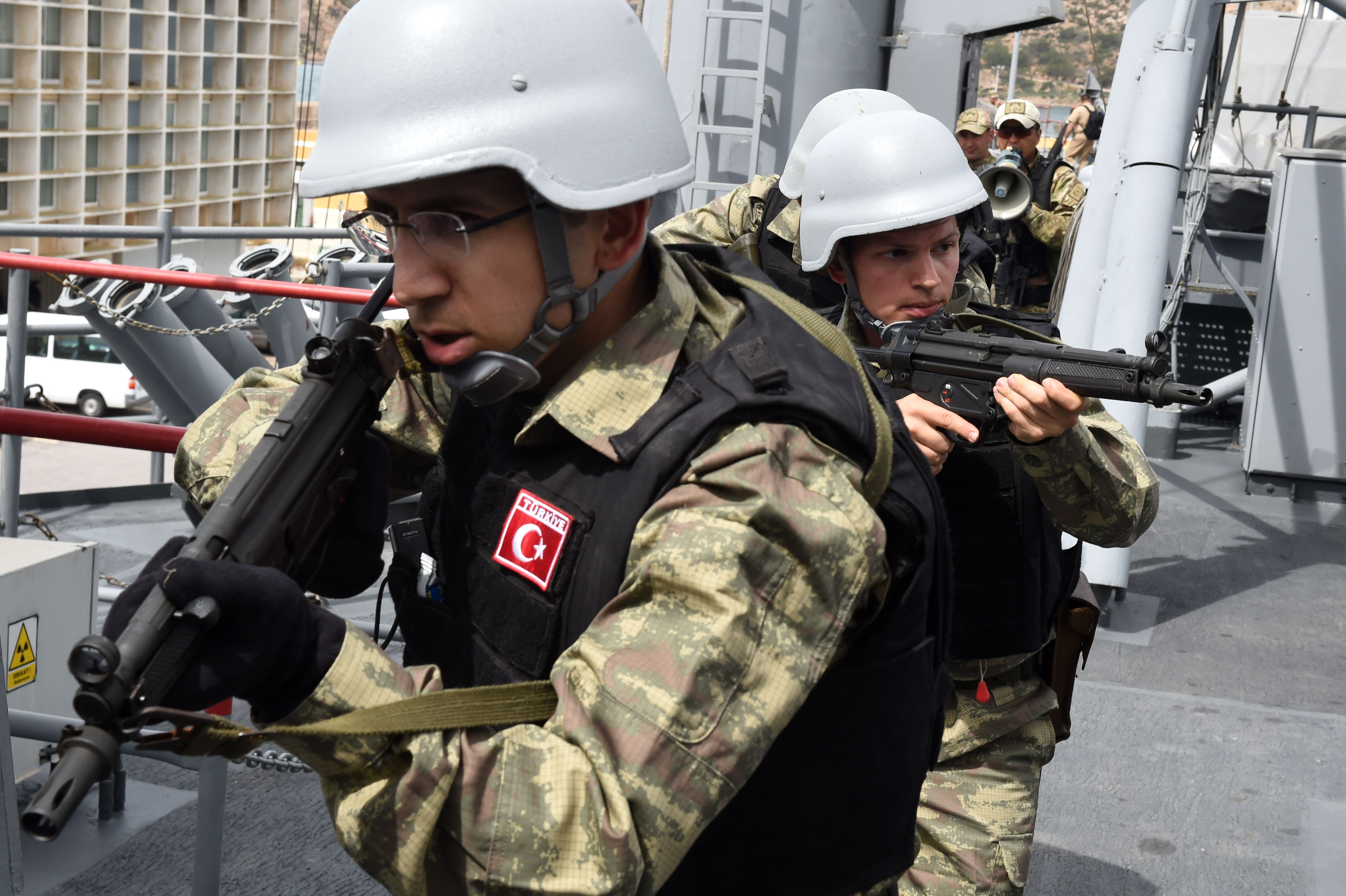
Turkish boarding teams practice tactical movements aboard TCG Gökçeada (F-494) during exercise Phoenix Express 2017.

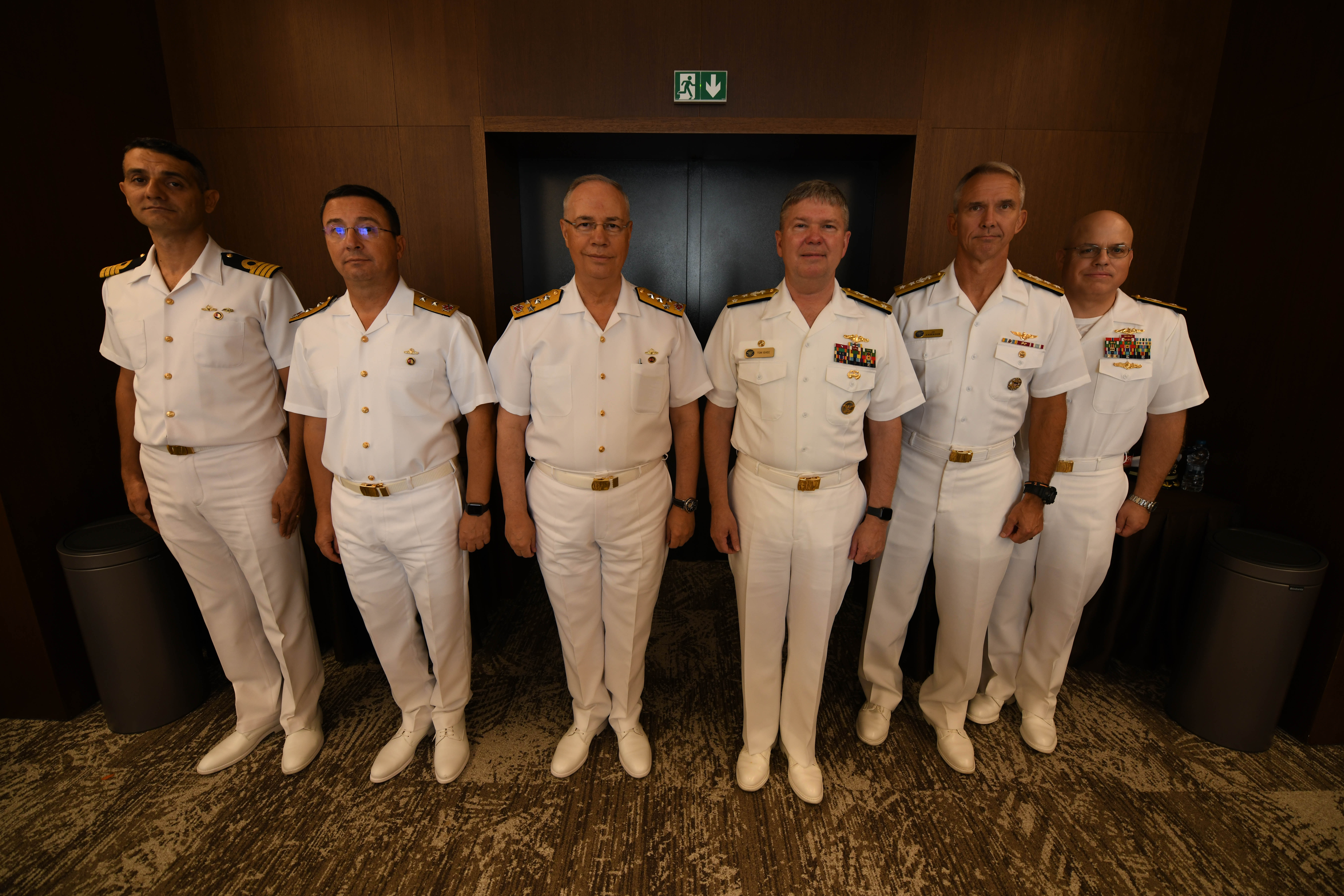
Turkish and U.S. naval officers during Exercise Sea Breeze 2024.

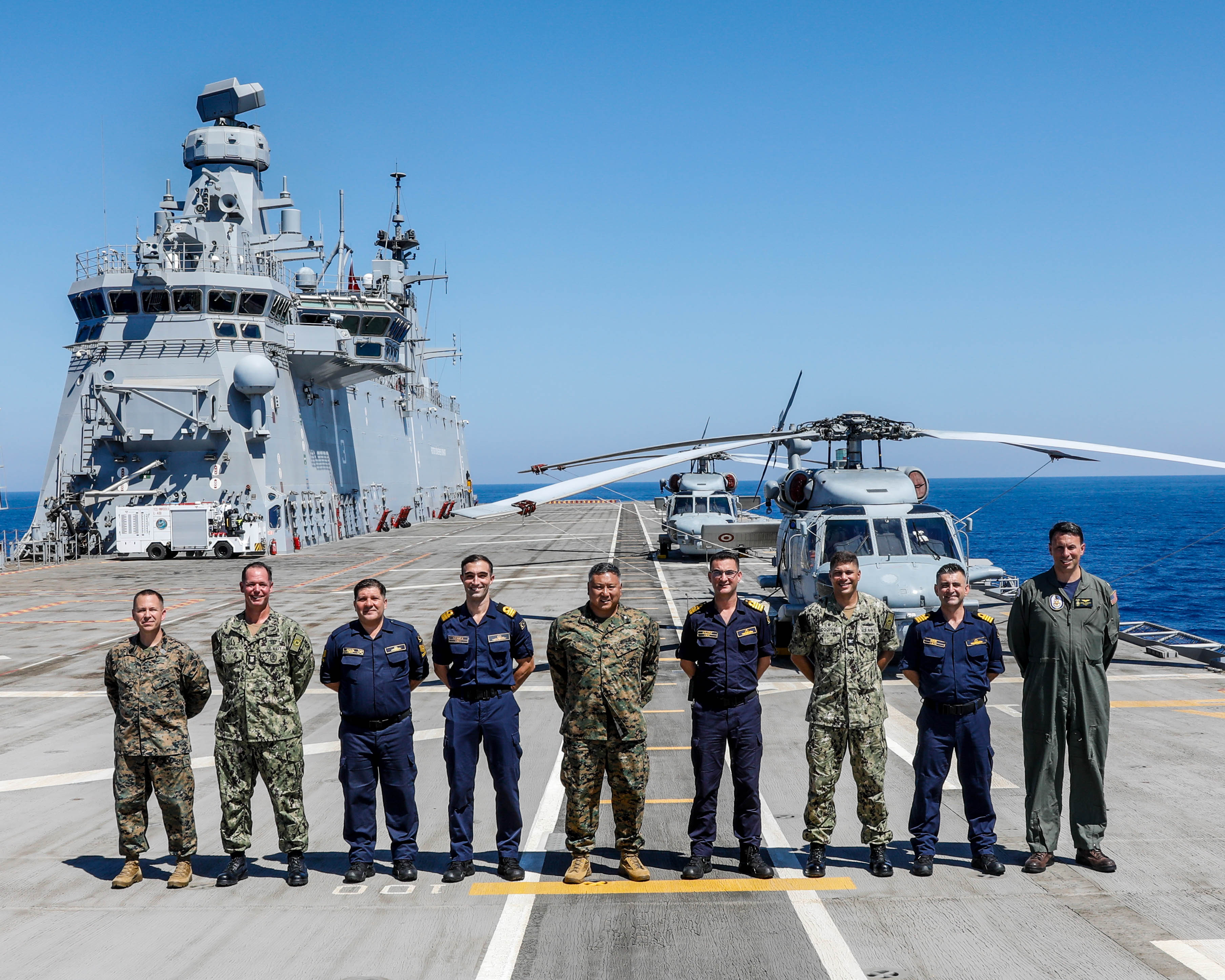
Officers of the USS Wasp (LHD-1) Amphibious Ready Group are being welcomed by the officers of TCG Anadolu (L-400), August 15, 2024.

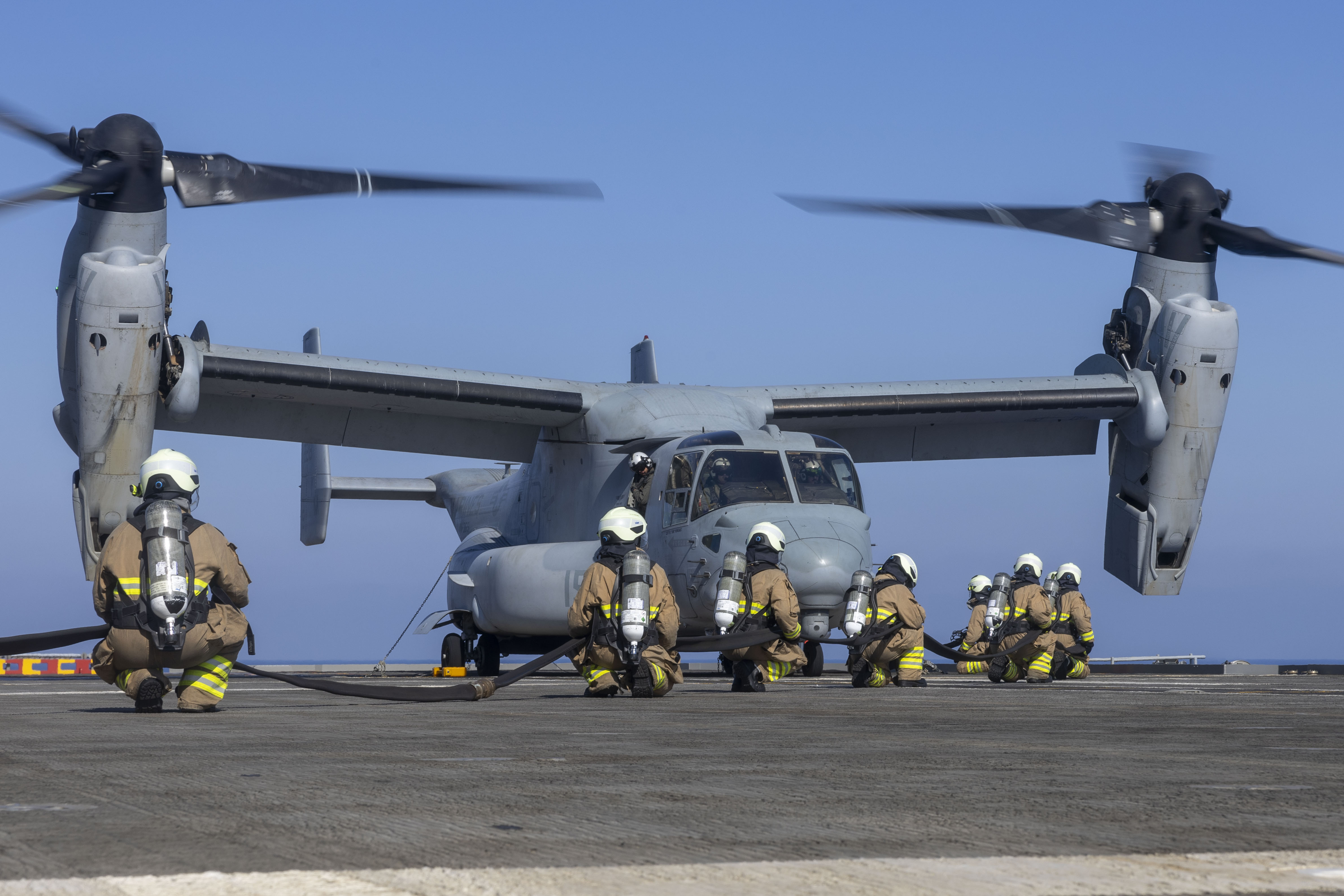
Turkish sailors assigned to TCG Anadolu (L-400) simulate refueling an MV-22B Osprey of the U.S. Marine Corps on Anadolu’s flight deck, August 15, 2024.

== See also ==
- Turkish Armed Forces
- Turkish Land Forces
- Turkish Air Force
- Lists of ships of the Turkish Navy
- Ottoman Navy
- List of commanders of the Turkish Naval Forces
