= Retinar PTR =

Turkish Ground Radar

- Country of origin: Turkey
- Designer: Meteksan Savunma
- Introduced: 2018
- Type: Transportable intrapulse modulated array
- Frequency: K_{a} band
- Beamwidth: 2°
- Range: 12 km (7.5 mi)
- Azimuth: 360º
- Precision: 0.2º
- Power: 1.5 W

The Retinar PTR is an intrapulse modulated Doppler radar operating in the K_{a} band developed by Turkish electronics company Meteksan Savunma. It was introduced in 2018 and is currently in service with the Turkish Armed Forces, the Turkish Gendarme, and Turkish allies. Its main purpose is to serve as a mobile ground surveillance and security radar, and it can be operated by a crew of two remotely up to 1 km away.
