= Meteksan Savunma =

Turkish Defense Technology Company

Meteksan Savunma Sanayii A.Ş.
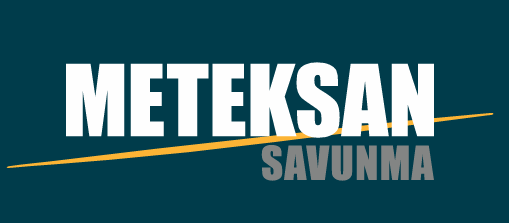
- Industry: Defence; Software; Electronics
- Founded: 2006
- Headquarters: Ankara, Turkey
- Key people: Aziz Tunç Batum (CEO) Selçuk Kerem Alparslan (President)
- Products: Radar Systems, Perimeter Surveillance Systems, Electro-Optic Systems, Underwater Acoustic Systems, Communication Systems, Platform Simulators
- Number of employees: 450
- Website: meteksan.com

Meteksan Savunma is a Turkish defense technology company based in Ankara, specializing in radar systems, perimeter surveillance systems, laser and electro-optic systems, communication systems, underwater acoustic systems and simulators. It is part of Bilkent Holding, a large conglomerate funded by Bilkent University, which is Turkey's 15th largest industrial group, and privately held.

Meteksan is one of the suppliers of the Turkish Armed Forces, and has been involved in projects such as missile defense systems, attack helicopters, UAVs, corvettes and underwater weapons systems.

== History ==
Meteksan Defence is established in 2006 as a subsidiary of Bilkent Holding and Bilkent University. The company's first contract was Army Operational Training Center Project. Then "Millimeter Wave Radar Techniques for Land Target Acquisition" and "Naval Warfare Simulation System" projects were awarded through TUBITAK funds.

In 2009, it was designated as a "Center of Excellence in Underwater Acoustics" by Turkey's Undersecretariat for Defense Industries, the first such center established as part of a Turkish government initiative to increase the output of its local defense industries. Since 2010 Meteksan launched a product oriented strategy within the defense electronics and has become one of the fastest growing private-sector companies of defense industry in Turkey.

Meteksan demonstrates a performance higher than international industry benchmark, and reveals more than 250,000 USD revenue per employee. The company operates a successful network of suppliers and SMEs; maximizes direct personnel efficiency ratio to its highest in Turkish defense industry, while minimizing overhead to total expense ratio.

== Products ==
- MILDAR Fire Control Radar
- MILSAR UAV SAR/GMTI Radar
- MILSAS synthetic aperture sonar system
- Retinar Perimeter Surveillance Radar Family
- KAPAN Anti-Drone System
- OKIS Automatic Take-off and Landing System
- Radar Altimeters
- Data Links for Missile Systems
- C-Band UAV Data Link System
- YAKAMOS 2020 Hull Mounted Sonar System
- Underwater Early Warning Sensor Networks
- Damage Control Simulator
- Fire Training Simulator
- Retinar FAR-AD Drone Detection Radar
- Helicopter Underwater Escape Training (HUET) Simulator
- ULAQ Armed Unmanned Surface Vehicle
