= TCG Koçhisar (P-1221) =

Patrol boat of the Turkish Naval Forces

History

Turkey
- Name: Koçhisar
- Namesake: Koçhisar
- Builder: ASFAT, Istanbul Naval Shipyard, Pendik, Istanbul
- Laid down: 10 December 2022
- Launched: 23 September 2023
- Commissioned: 20 June 2026; 3 months ago
- Identification: Callsign: Pennant number: P-1221

General characteristics
- Type: Offshore patrol vessel; Corvette (full armament configuration)
- Displacement: 2,300 tonnes
- Length: 99.56 m (326.6 ft)
- Beam: 14.42 m (47.3 ft)
- Draft: 3.77 m (12.4 ft)
- Propulsion: CODELOD: 4 x Diesel; 2 x Electric Motor; Generators: 4 x Diesel Generator
- Speed: Maximum: 24 kn (44 km/h; 28 mph); Cruise: 12 kn (22 km/h; 14 mph)
- Range: 4,500 nmi (8,300 km; 5,200 mi)
- Endurance: 21 days
- Boats & landing craft carried: 2 x RHIB
- Complement: 1 x Naval helicopter; 1 x UAV
- Crew: 104
- Sensors & processing systems: Sonar: METEKSAN YAKAMOS 2020 New Generation Mounted Sonar; Radars: ASELSAN MAR-D 3D Search Radar; ASELSAN 2 AKR-D Fire Control Radar; Navigation/LPI Radar; Systems: ASELSAN Piri – KATS (Infrared Search and Trace System); ASELSAN DENİZGÖZÜ OCTOPUS-S Electro-optical Search System; TÜBİTAK YELKOVAN Radar Electronic Support System; Combat Management System: HAVELSAN ADVENT SYS
- Armament: Full armament configuration: Guns: 1 x MKE 76 mm/62-caliber gun; 1 x Aselsan GOKDENIZ CIWS; 2 x UNIROBOTICS Targan 12.7 mm RCWS; Vertical launcher systems: 8 x MiDLAS Vertical Launching System (VLS) (optional); 8 x HISAR-D RF air defence missiles; Anti-ship missiles: 8 x Atmaca anti-ship missile; Anti-submarine warfare: Roketsan ASW rocket launcher system
- Aircraft carried: Hangar and platform for: S-70B Seahawk ASW helicopter; Unmanned aerial vehicles (UAV)

TCG Koçhisar (P-1221) is a Hisar-class offshore patrol vessel in the Turkish Naval Forces.

Laid down on 10 December 2022, as the second of the ten-planned ships of the Hisar-class offshore patrol vessel project, the Koçhisar was built by ASFAT at the Istanbul Naval Shipyard in Pendik, Istanbul, Turkey. She was launched along with TCG Akhisar (P-1220) on 23 September 2023. She was delivered to the Turkish Naval Forces as the first ship of her class to enter Turkish service on 20 June 2026. Her sister ship Akhisar was sold to the Romanian Naval Forces, and renamed Contraamiral Roman. Both ships were commissioned in service with their respective navies on the same day.

The missions of Koçhisar are such as military intelligence, reconnaissance, surveillance, special operations and asymmetric warfare at sea.
