= Anti-submarine weapon =

Weapon to be used in anti-submarine warfare

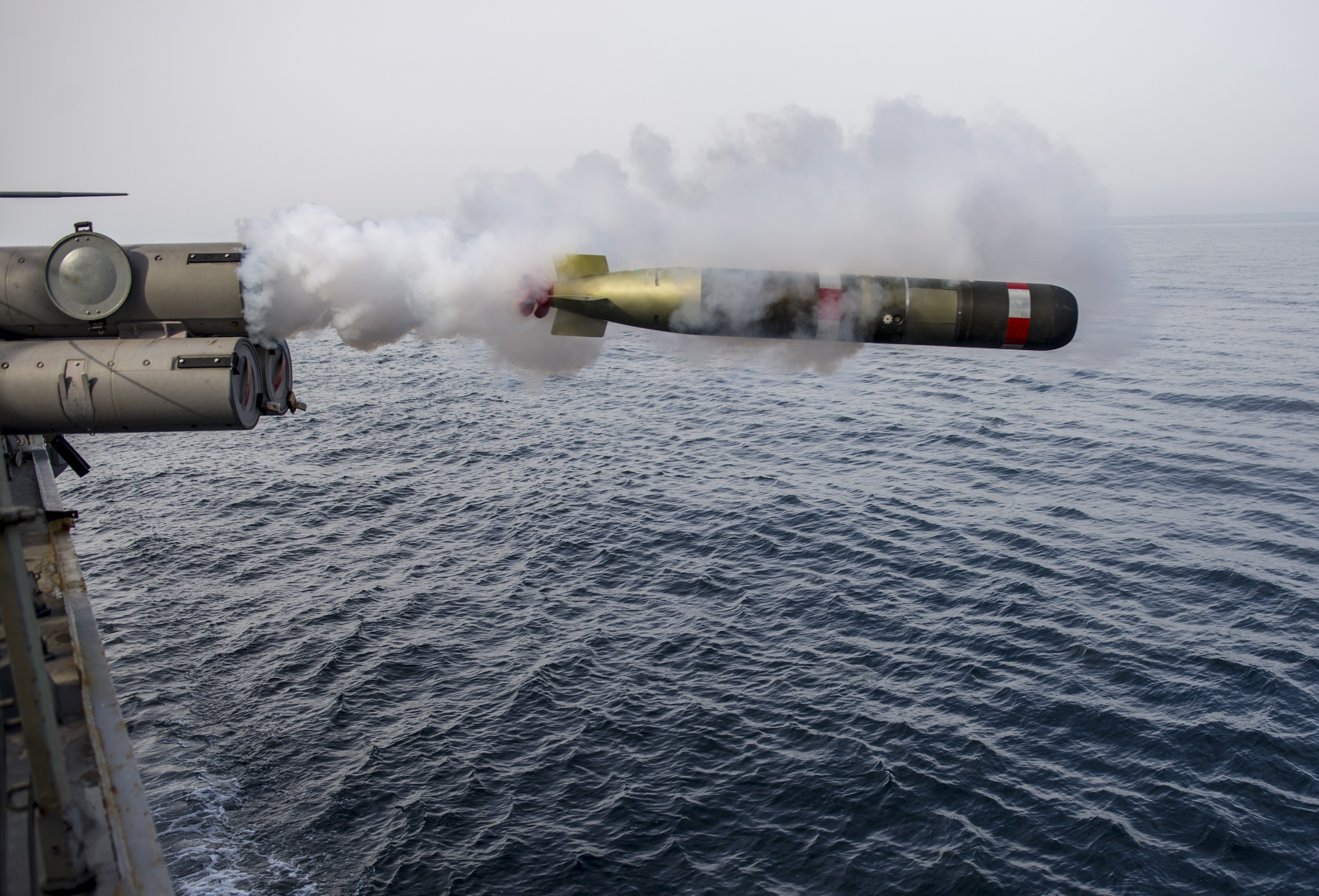
Mark 54 anti-submarine torpedo launching.

An anti-submarine weapon (ASW) is any one of a number of devices that are intended to act against a submarine and its crew, to destroy (sink) the vessel or reduce its capability as a weapon of war. In its simplest sense, an anti-submarine weapon is usually a projectile, missile or bomb that is optimized to destroy submarines.

== History ==
=== Before World War I ===
Prior to about 1890, naval weapons were only used against surface shipping. With the rise of the military submarine after this time, countermeasures were considered for use against them. The first submarine installation of torpedo tubes was in 1885 and the first ship was sunk by a submarine-launched torpedo in 1887. There were only two ways of countering the military submarine initially: ramming them or sinking them with gunfire. However, once they were submerged, they were largely immune until they had to surface again. By the start of the First World War there were nearly 300 submarines in service with another 80 in production.

=== World War I ===
World War I marked the first earnest conflict involving significant use of submarines and consequently marked the beginning of major efforts to counter that threat. In particular, the United Kingdom was desperate to defeat the U-boat threat against British merchant shipping. When the bombs that it employed were found to be ineffective it began equipping its destroyers with simple depth charges that could be dropped into the water around a suspected submarine's location. During this period it was found that explosions of these charges were more efficient if the charges were set to explode below or above the submarine. However, many other techniques were used, including minefields, barrages and Q-ships and the use of cryptanalysis against intercepted radio messages. The airship ("blimp") was used to drop bombs but fixed-wing aircraft were mostly used for reconnaissance. However, the most effective countermeasure was the convoy. In 1918 U-boat losses became unbearably high. During the war a total of 178 U-boats were sunk, by the following causes:

- Mines: 58;
- Depth charges: 30;
- Gunfire: 20;
- Submarine torpedoes: 20;
- Ramming: 19;
- Unknown: 19;
- Accidents: 7;
- Other (including bombs): 2

British submarines operated in the Baltic, North Sea and Atlantic as well as the Mediterranean and Black Sea. Most of the losses were due to mines but two were torpedoed. French, Italian and Russian submarines were also destroyed.

Before the war ended, the need for forward-throwing weapons had been recognized by the British and trials began. Hydrophones had been developed and were becoming effective as detection and location devices. Also, aircraft and airships had flown with depth bombs (aerial depth charges), albeit quite small ones with poor explosives. In addition, the specialist hunter-killer submarine had appeared, HMS R-1.

=== Inter-war ===
The main developments in this period were in detection, with both active sonar (ASDIC) and radar becoming effective. The British integrated the sonar with fire control and weapons to form an integrated system for warships. Germany was banned from having a submarine fleet but began construction in secret during the 1930s. When war broke out it had 21 submarines at sea.

In the inter-war period Britain and France had experimented with several novel types of submarine. New sonars and weapons were developed for them.

=== World War II ===
==== Atlantic/Mediterranean Theatre ====
By the time of World War II, anti-submarine weapons had been developed somewhat, but during that war, there was a renewal of all-out submarine warfare by Germany as well as widespread use of submarines by most of the other combatants. The effective use of depth charges required the combined resources and skills of many individuals during an attack. Sonar information, helmsmen, depth charge crews and the movement of other ships had to be carefully coordinated in order to deliver a successful depth charge attack. As the Battle of the Atlantic wore on, British and Commonwealth forces in particular proved particularly adept at depth charge tactics, and formed some of the first destroyer hunter-killer groups to actively seek out and destroy German U-boats.

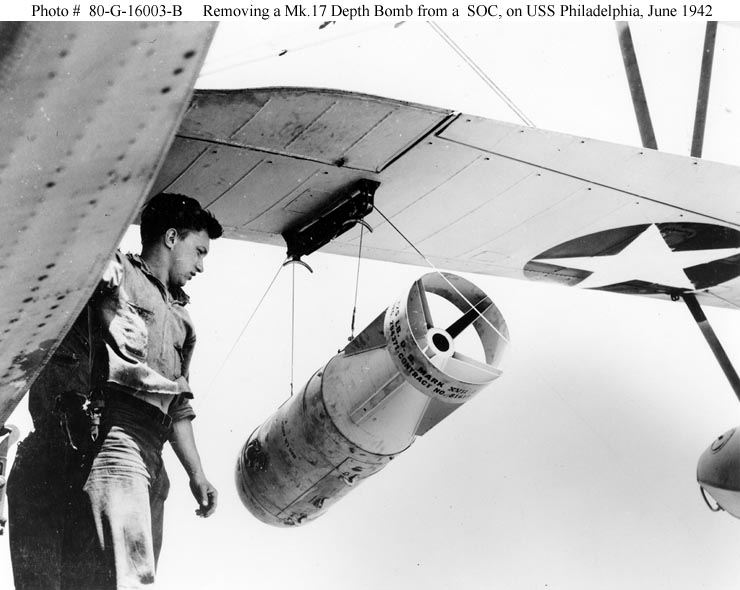
Mk. 17 depth bomb is being unloaded from a SOC Seagull scout plane on board the USS Philadelphia (CL-41) during an Atlantic U-boat sweep near Panama in June 1942.

Air-dropped depth bombs were normally set to explode at a shallow depth, while the submarine was crash-diving to escape attack. Aircraft were very successful in not only attacking U-boats, but also in disrupting U-boats from carrying out attacks against ships. Some were fitted with a searchlight as well as bombs.

A host of new anti-submarine weapons were developed. Forward-throwing anti-submarine mortars were introduced in 1942 to prevent loss of sonar contact. These mortars, the first being Hedgehog, fired a pattern of small depth charges. One type of charge was used to create entire patterns of explosions underwater around a potential enemy, while the second type of round was fitted with contact detonators, meaning the warhead exploded only upon contact with the submarine. A later design enabled a pursuing destroyer or destroyer escort to maintain continual sonar contact until a definite "hit" was achieved. Additionally, new weapons were designed for use by aircraft, rapidly increasing their importance in fighting submarines. The development of the FIDO (Mk 24 mine) anti-submarine homing torpedo in 1943 (which could be dropped from aircraft) was a significant contributor to the rising number of German sub sinkings.

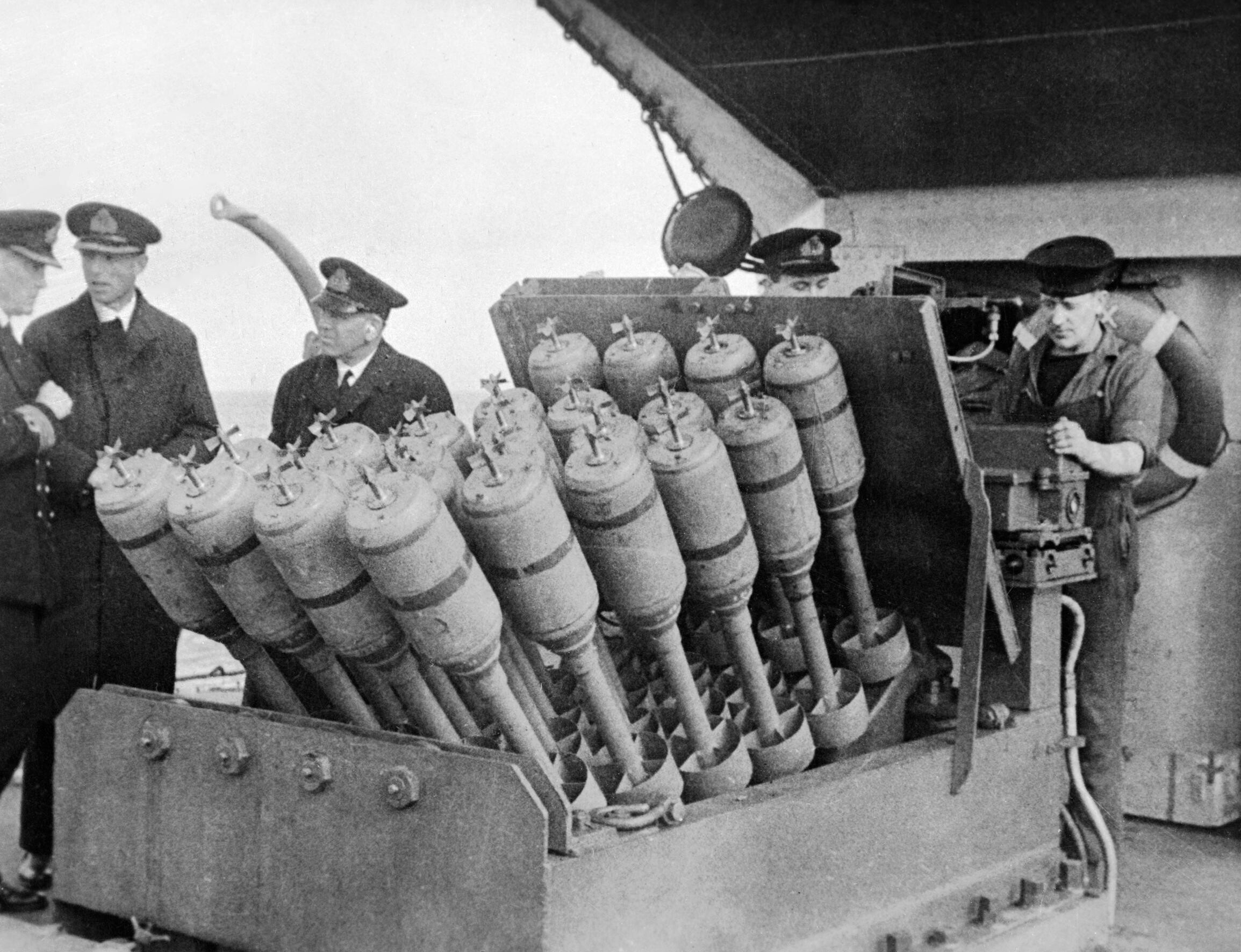
Hedgehog, a 24-"barreled" anti-submarine mortar, mounted on the forecastle of the destroyer HMS Westcott, 28 November 1945. The 27-year veteran Westcott claimed the first-ever kill by Hedgehog February 2, 1942, when she sank U-581.

==== Pacific Theater ====
Japan, the United States, Great Britain, The Netherlands, and Australia all employed anti-submarine forces in the Pacific Theater during World War II. Because the Japanese Navy tended to utilize its submarines against capital ships such as cruisers, battleships and aircraft carriers, U.S. and Allied anti-submarine efforts concentrated their work in support of fleet defense.

Early Japanese submarines were not very maneuverable under water, could not dive very deep, and lacked radar. Later in the war, Japanese submarines were fitted with radar scanning equipment for improved hunting while surfaced. However, these radar-equipped submarines were in some instances sunk due to the ability of U.S. radar receivers to detect their tell-tale scanning emissions. For example, Batfish sank three Japanese radar-equipped submarines in the span of four days. In 1944, U.S. anti-submarine forces began to employ the FIDO (Mk 24 mine) air-dropped homing torpedo against submerged Japanese subs with considerable success.

In contrast, Allied submarines were largely committed against Japanese merchant shipping. As a consequence, Japanese anti-submarine forces were forced to spread their efforts to defend the entirety of their merchant shipping lanes, not only to resupply their forces, but also to continue the necessary importation of war material to the Japanese home islands.

At first, Japanese anti-submarine defenses proved less than effective against U.S. submarines. Japanese sub detection gear was not as advanced as that of some other nations. The primary Japanese anti-submarine weapon for most of WWII was the depth charge, and Japanese depth charge attacks by its surface forces initially proved fairly unsuccessful against U.S. fleet submarines. Unless caught in shallow water, a U.S. submarine commander could normally dive to a deeper depth in order to escape destruction, sometimes using temperature gradient barriers to escape pursuit. Additionally, during the first part of the war, the Japanese tended to set their depth charges too shallow, unaware that U.S. submarines possessed the ability to dive beyond 150 feet.

Unfortunately, the deficiencies of Japanese depth-charge tactics were revealed in a June 1943 press conference held by U.S. Congressman Andrew J. May, a member of the House Military Affairs Committee who had visited the Pacific theater and received many confidential intelligence and operational briefings. At the press conference, May revealed that American submarines had a high survivability because Japanese depth charges were fused to explode at too shallow a depth, typically 100 feet (because Japanese forces believed U.S. subs did not normally exceed this depth). Various press associations sent this story over their wires, and many newspapers, including one in Honolulu, thoughtlessly published it. Soon enemy depth charges were rearmed to explode at a more effective depth of 250 feet. Vice Admiral Charles A. Lockwood, commander of the U.S. submarine fleet in the Pacific, later estimated that May's revelation cost the navy as many as ten submarines and 800 crewmen.

In addition to resetting their depth charges to deeper depths, Japanese anti-submarine forces also began employing autogyro aircraft and Magnetic Anomaly Detection (MAD) equipment to sink U.S. subs, particularly those plying major shipping channels or operating near the home islands. Despite this onslaught, U.S. sub sinkings of Japanese shipping continued to increase at a furious rate as more U.S. subs deployed each month to the Pacific. By the end of the war, U.S. submarines had destroyed more Japanese shipping than all other weapons combined, including aircraft.

=== Post-war developments ===
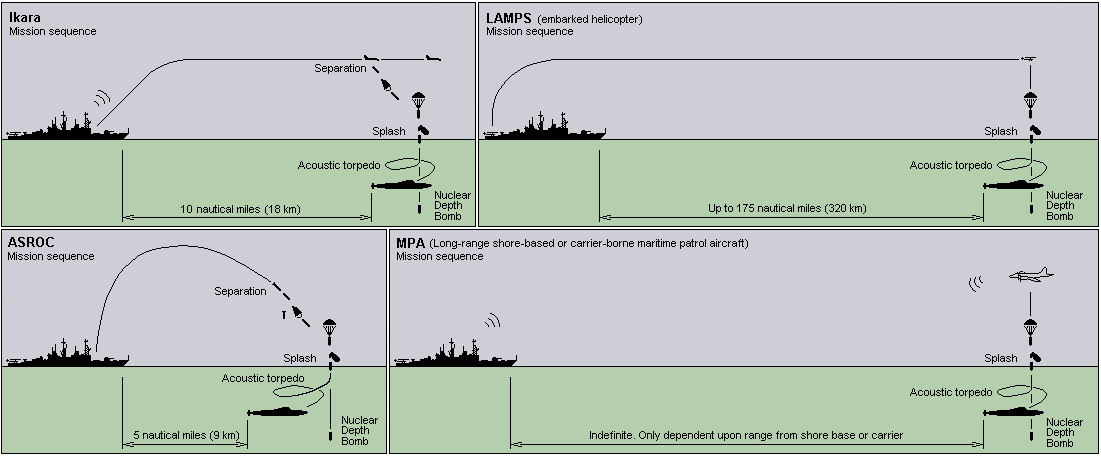
The four principal methods of delivering an acoustic homing torpedo or a Nuclear Depth Bomb at long range from a surface escort. Only the rocket-thrown weapons (ASROC and Ikara) are available for use in all-weather conditions and at instant readiness.

The Cold War brought a new kind of conflict to submarine warfare. This war of development had both the United States and Soviet Union racing to develop better, stealthier and more potent submarines while consequently developing better and more accurate anti-submarine weapons and new delivery platforms, including the helicopter.

Attack submarines (SSKs and SSNs) were developed to include faster, longer range and more discriminating torpedoes. This, coupled with improvements to sonar systems, made ballistic missile submarines more vulnerable to attack submarines and also increased the anti-surface warfare (ASuW) capabilities of attack subs. SSBNs themselves as well as cruise-missile submarines (SSGNs) were fitted with increasingly more accurate and longer range missiles and received the greatest noise reduction technology. To counter this increasing threat torpedoes were honed to target submarines more effectively and new anti-submarine missiles and rockets were developed to give ships a longer-range anti-submarine capability. Ships, submarines and maritime patrol aircraft (MPA) also received increasingly effective technology for locating submarines, e.g. magnetic anomaly detectors (MAD) and improved sonar.

== Anti-submarine technology ==
The first component of an anti-submarine attack is detection: anti-sub weapons cannot be successfully employed without first locating the enemy submarine.

=== Detection equipment ===
==== Optical detection ====
Initial methods involved making visual contact with the submarine, and remains an important method of target confirmation. This may now be supplemented by thermal techniques. However, the low "indiscretion rate" of modern submarines means that optical detection is now less successful.

==== Radio intercept ====
The use of the "wolf pack" by submarines in both the first and second World Wars allowed interception of radio signals. Though these were encrypted, they were broken by the British at "Room 40" in the First World War and by Bletchley Park during the second. This allowed convoys to be diverted and hunter-killer groups to be targeted on the pack. Submarines now transmit using methods that are less susceptible to intercept.

In World War II, high frequency direction finding (HF/DF or "Huff-duff) was used by Allied escort vessels to detect submarines making position or sighting reports. The direction finding technology was not thought feasible for installation on a warship by the Kriegsmarine and they attributed successes of Huff-duff to radar technology of a performance that did not exist at the time. The standard escort tactic was to steer at speed in the direction of an HF/DF bearing until the target submarine was sighted (often visually, but sometimes on radar) and open fire before the submarine dived. If the submarine dived before being shelled, it could be hunted on sonar.

==== Radar ====
Radar was a prime tool in World War II for locating surfaced submarines. After development of the snorkel, and then of nuclear-powered submarines, submarines rarely surfaced outside their home port, rendering direct radar detection largely useless. However, it is possible that radar can detect the surface effects produced by a submarine.

==== Sonar ====
Since World War II, sonar has emerged as the primary method of underwater detection of submarines. The most effective type has varied between active and passive, depending on the countermeasures taken by the submarine. Its versatility has increased with the development of air-dropped sonobuoys, which relay sonar signals to overhead aircraft, dipping sonar from helicopters and fixed long range systems.

==== Magnetic anomaly detection ====
A magnetic anomaly detector (MAD) is an electronic magnetometer designed to measure magnetic field variations caused by large metal objects, such as the steel hull of a submarine. Before the development of sonar buoys, MAD gear was often installed in aircraft to pick up shallow-submerged submarines. It is still used today.

==== Other non-acoustic methods ====
Submarine detector loops were one of the first ways of finding the presence of an underwater submarine. The "sniffer" for detecting diesel exhausts was developed in the Second World War. More recently indirect methods of submarine detection have been tried, mainly via its wake.

== Anti-submarine weapons ==
Anti-submarine weapons can be divided into three categories according to their mode of operation: guided weapons, non-guided weapons, and rocket and mortar weapons.

Guided anti-submarine weapons, such as torpedoes, seek out the submarine, either via its own sensors or from the launching platform's sensors. The advantage with this type of weapon is that it requires a relatively small payload as it detonates in direct contact or within a very close proximity of the submarine. The disadvantage is that this type of weapon can be decoyed and is adversely affected by stealth features of the submarine.

Non-guided anti-submarine weapons, such as mines and depth charges, are "dumb" weapons that has to be carried to the submarine or that the submarine has to come in close proximity of. This is to some degree compensated by a heavy payload, in some mines exceeding half a metric ton, but since the effect of an underwater explosion decreases with a factor of the distance cubed, an increase in payload of a depth charge from 100 to 200 kg would not result in more than a few meters in killing radius.

The main advantage of rockets and mortar weapons, such as anti-submarine grenades and anti-submarine rockets, is their rapid response time as they are carried through the air to the target. Once dropped on top of the target, they also have the advantage of not being sensitive to decoys or stealth features. A hybrid of this category is the rocket launched torpedo, which is carried to the proximity of the target via a rocket; this then reduces the response time and gives the submarine less time to undertake countermeasures or evasive maneuvers.

Finally, a submarine can also be destroyed by means of artillery fire and missiles in the rare case that a modern submarine surfaces, but these weapons are not specifically designed for submarines and their importance in modern anti-submarine warfare is very limited.

=== Guns ===
Gunfire has been used to disable submarines from the First World War and onwards. After the First World War, special ASW shells were developed for medium calibre naval guns. An example of the modern ASW shell is Kingfisher gun-launched anti-submarine munition.

=== Depth charge ===
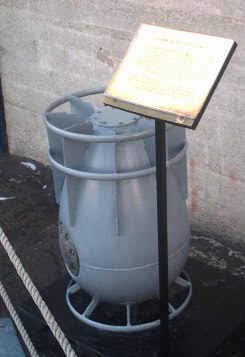
A U.S. Navy depth charge, used in WWII

Perhaps the simplest of the anti-submarine weapons, the depth charge, is a large canister filled with explosives and set to explode at a predetermined depth. The concussive effects of the explosion could damage a submarine from a distance, though a depth charge explosion had to be very close to break the submarine's hull. Air-dropped depth charges were referred to as 'depth bombs'; these were sometimes fitted with an aerodynamic casing.

Surface-launched depth charges are typically used in a barrage manner in order to cause significant damage through continually battering the submarine with concussive blasts. Depth charges improved considerably since their first employment in World War I. To match improvements in submarine design, pressure-sensing mechanisms and explosives were improved during World War II to provide greater shock power and a charge that would reliably explode over a wide range of depth settings.

Aerial-launched depth bombs are dropped in twos and threes in pre-computed patterns, either from airplanes, helicopters, or blimps. Since aerial attacks normally resulted from surprising the submarine on the surface, air-dropped depth bombs were usually timed to explode at a shallow depth, while the submarine was in the process of making a crash dive. In many cases destruction was not achieved, but the submarine was nonetheless forced to retire for repairs.

Early depth charges were designed to be rolled into the water off of the stern of a fast ship. The ship had to be moving fast enough to avoid the concussion of the depth charge blast. Later designs allowed the depth charge to be hurled some distance from the ship, allowing slower ships to operate them and for larger areas to be covered.

Today, depth charges not only can be dropped by aircraft or surface ships, but can also be carried by missiles to their target.

=== Anti-submarine ahead-throwing projectiles ===
==== Anti-submarine mortar ====
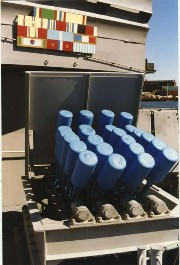
A Hedgehog mortar based depth charge launcher

With the discovery that depth charges rarely scored a kill by hitting a submarine, but instead were most effective in barrages, it was found that similar or better effects could be obtained by larger numbers of smaller explosions. The anti-submarine mortar is actually an array of spigot mortars, designed to fire off a number of small explosives simultaneously and create an array of explosions around a submarine's position. These were often called Hedgehogs after the name given to a World War II British design. Later ASW mortar shells were fitted with impact detonators that fired only after actual contact with the hull of the submarine, allowing sonar crews to maintain a constant sound track until a hit was achieved.

The Hedgehog fired twenty-four 14.5 kg charges whereas a later development called the "Squid" fired three full-sized depth charges. A further development called "Limbo" was used into the 1960s, and this used 94 kg charges.

A development of the anti-submarine mortar, designed primarily for the exceptionally challenging task of littoral anti-submarine operations, utilizes a shaped charge warhead. An example of this is the Saab Dynamics Elma ASW-600 and the upgraded ASW-601 on YouTube.

==== Anti-submarine rockets ====
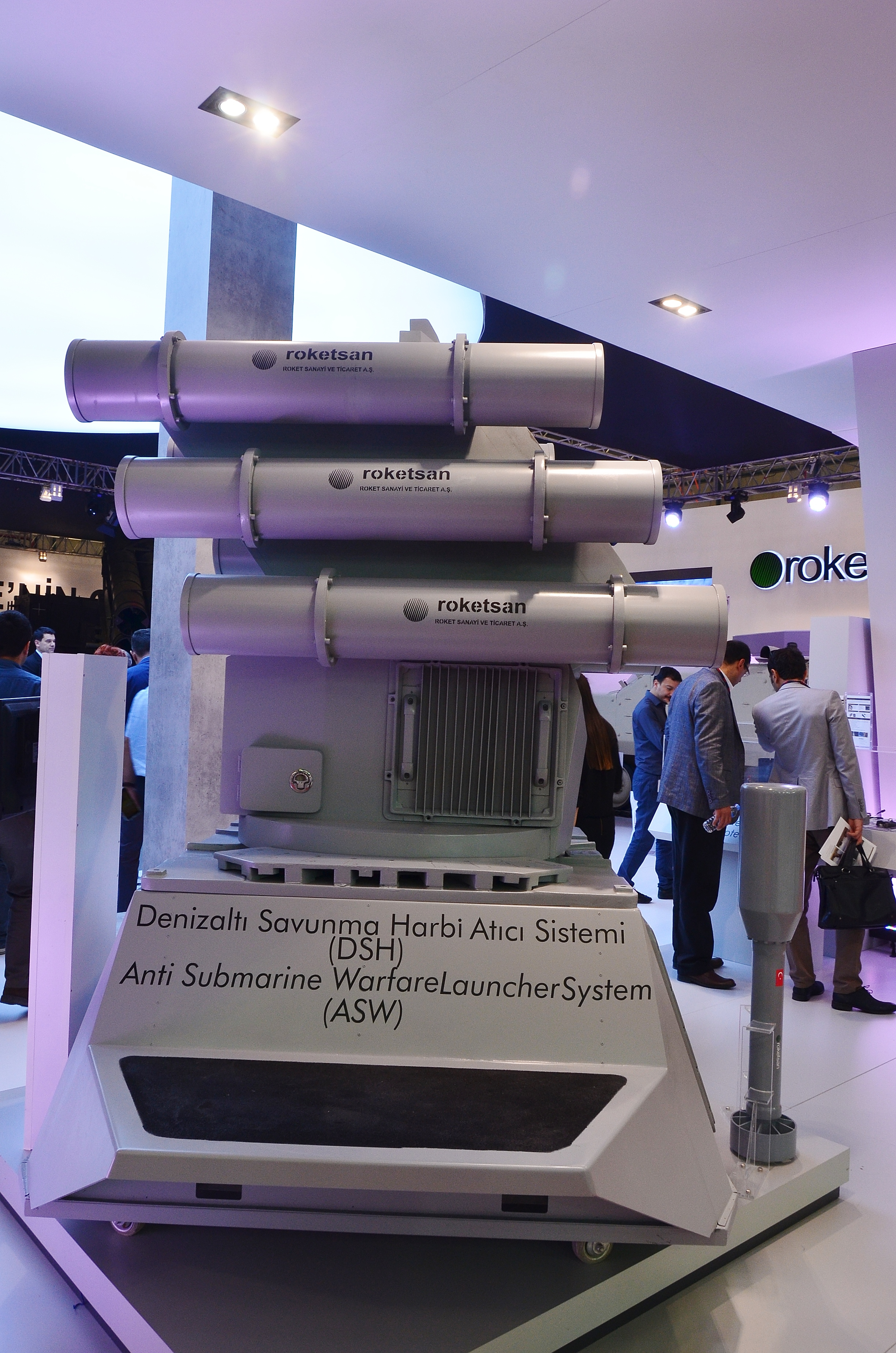
Turkish modern anti-submarine warfare rocket launcher system at the Roketsan stand at IDEF 2015

Anti-submarine rockets are very similar to anti-submarine morters. Some examples of the latest anti-submarine rockets are Roketsan ASW rocket launcher system, RBU-6000, RBU-1200.

=== Mine ===
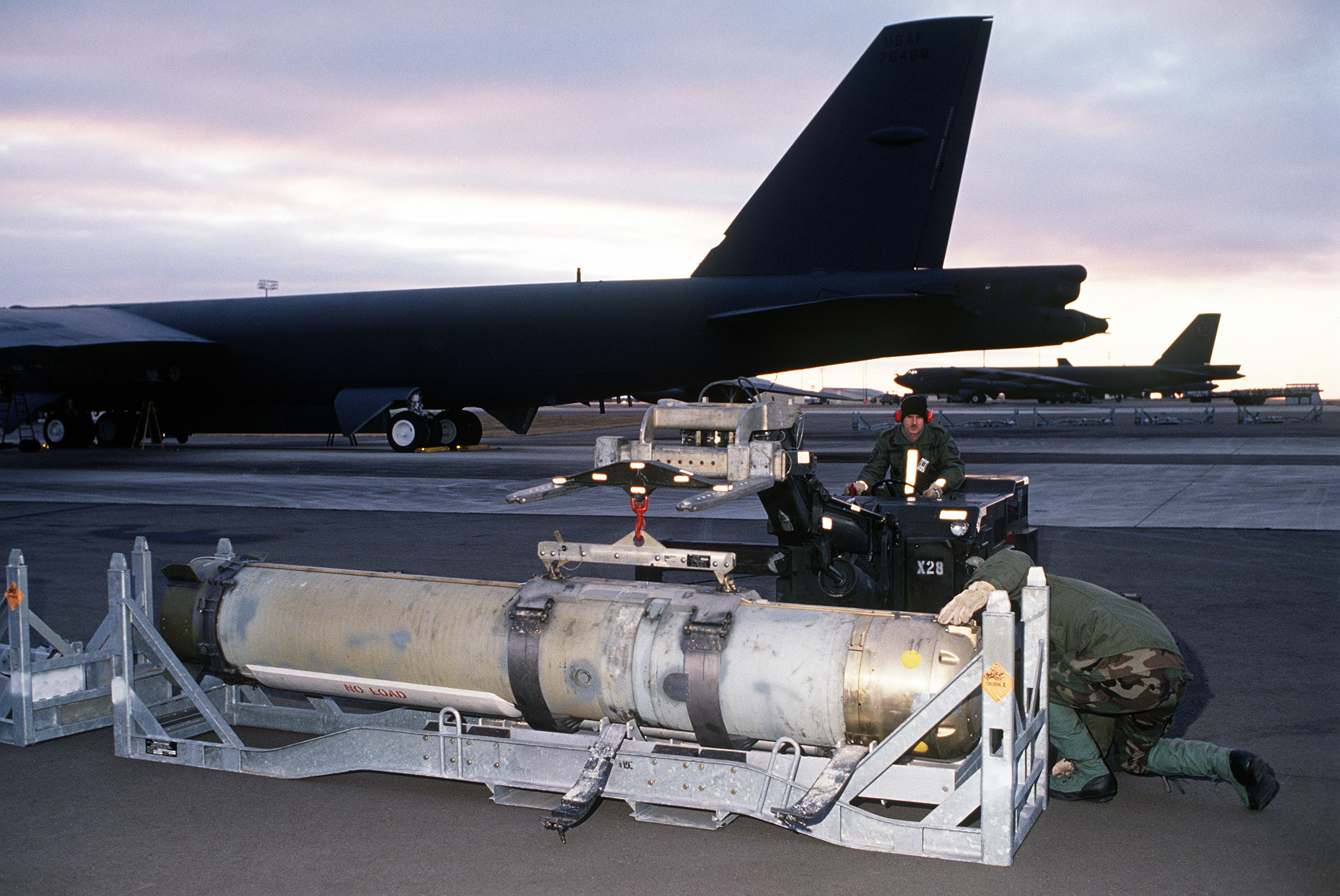
A Mark 60 CAPTOR mine being loaded onto a B-52 Stratofortress at Loring Air Force Base

Similar to naval mines designed to defeat surface ships, mines can be laid to wait for an enemy submarine to pass by and then explode to cause concussive damage to the submarine. Some are mobile and upon detection they can move towards the submarine until within lethal range. There has even been development of mines that have the ability to launch an encapsulated torpedo at a detected submarine. Mines can be laid by submarines, ships, or aircraft.

=== Anti-submarine torpedo ===
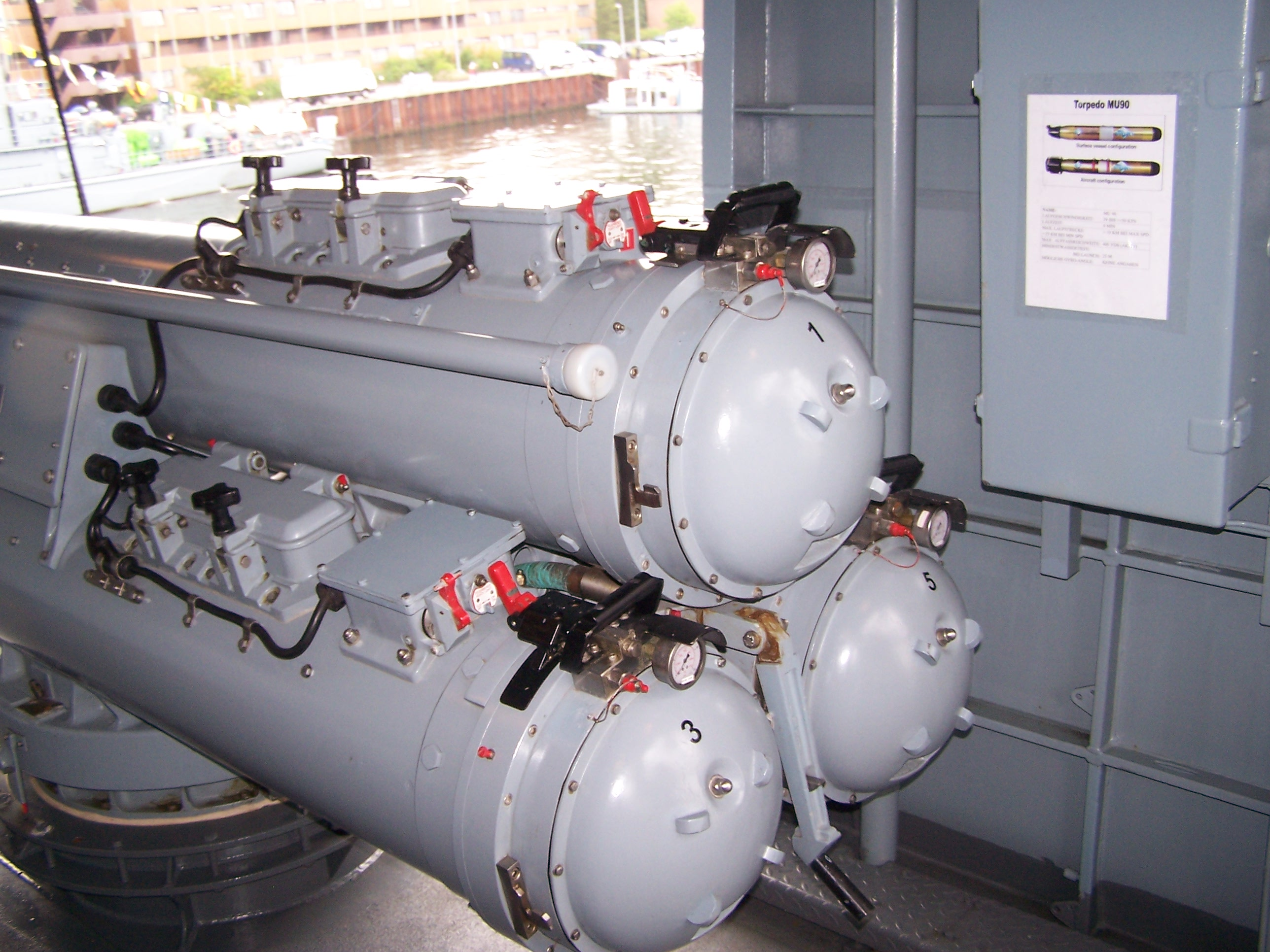
MU90 torpedo launcher aboard F221 Hessen, a Sachsen class frigate of the German Navy.

The early anti-submarine torpedoes were straight-running types and usually a group was fired in case the target manoeuvred. They can be divided into two main types, the heavyweight which are fired from submarines, and the lightweight which are fired from ships, dropped from aircraft (both fixed wing and helicopters) or delivered by rocket. Later ones used active/passive sonar homing and wire-guidance. Pattern running and wake homing torpedoes have also been developed.

The first successful homing torpedo was introduced by Nazi Germany's Kriegsmarine for use by its U-boat arm against Allied shipping. After capturing several of these weapons, along with independent research, the United States introduced the FIDO air-dropped homing torpedo (also called the Mark 24 'mine' as a cover) in 1943. FIDO was designed to breach the steel pressure hull of a submarine but not necessarily cause a catastrophic implosion, forcing the now-crippled submarine to surface where the submarine and crew might possibly be captured. After World War II, homing torpedoes became one of the primary anti-submarine weapons, used by most of the world's naval powers. Aircraft continued to be a primary launching platform, including the newly available helicopter, though homing torpedoes can also be launched from surface ships or submarines. However, the torpedo's inherent limitations in speed of attack and detection by the target have led to the development of missile-borne anti-submarine weapons that can be delivered practically on top of the enemy submarine, such as ASROC.

On ships the torpedoes are generally launched from a triple-barreled launcher by compressed air. These may be mounted on deck or below. On submarines torpedoes have been carried externally as well as internally. The latter have been launched in the past by stern tubes as well as by the more normal forward ones.

Aircraft delivery platforms have included both unmanned helicopters, such as the US DASH, and manned ones such as British Westland Wasp. The helicopter may be solely a weapons carrier or it can have submarine detection capabilities.

=== Anti-submarine missiles ===
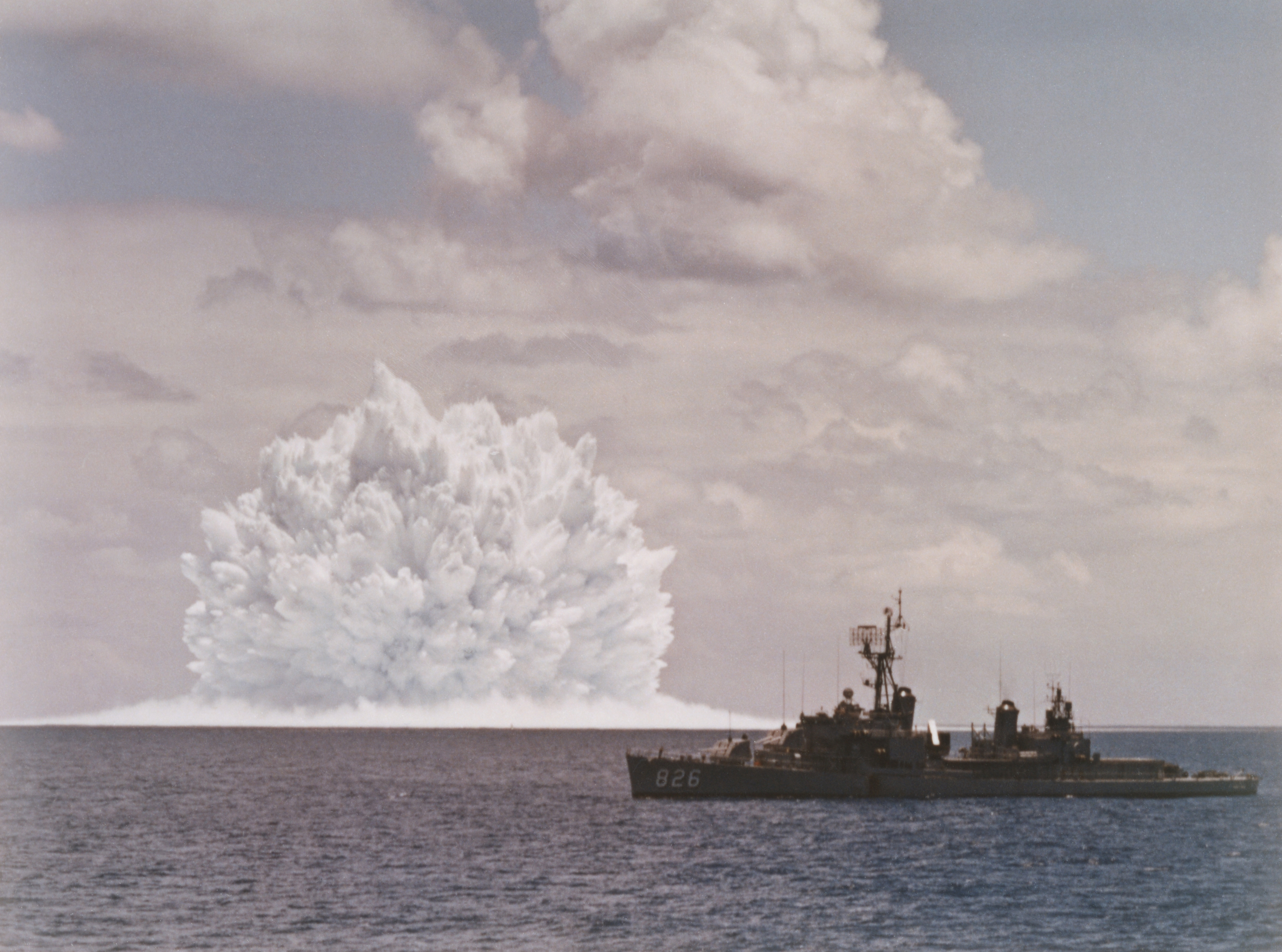
Nuclear-armed ASROC anti-submarine ballistic missile test in 1962

Some examples of the latest anti-submarine missiles are SMART, RUM-139 VL-ASROC, RPK-9 Medvedka, CY-5 and MILAS. The missile type is differ from other types of missiles in that instead of having a warhead which the missiles delivers to the target directly and explodes, they carry another anti-submarine weapon to a point of the surface where that weapon is dropped in the water to complete the attack. The missile itself launches from its platform and travels to the designated delivery point.

The major advantages of anti-submarine missiles are range and speed of attack. Torpedoes are not very fast compared to a missile, nor as long-ranged, and are much easier for a submarine to detect. Anti-sub missiles are usually delivered from surface vessels, offering the surface escort an all-weather, all-sea-conditions instant readiness weapon to attack time-urgent targets that no other delivery system can match for speed of response. They have the added advantage that they are under the direct control of the escort vessel's commander, and unlike air-delivered weapons cannot be diverted to other taskings, or be dependent on weather or maintenance availability. Aircraft delivery can be further compromised by low fuel state or an expended weapon load. The missile is always available, and at instant readiness. It allows the torpedo or nuclear depth bomb to enter the water practically on top of the submarine's position, minimizing the submarine's ability to detect and evade the attack. Missiles are also more rapid and accurate in many cases than helicopters or aircraft for dropping torpedoes and depth charges, with a typical interval of 1 to 1.5 minutes from a launch decision to torpedo splashdown. Helicopters frequently take much longer to just get off the escort's deck.

== Weapon control systems ==
The readiness of weapons was at first determined manually. Early fire control consisted of range measurements and calculation of the submarine's course and speed. The aiming point was then manually determined by rule. Later, mechanical computers were used to solve the fire control problem with electrical indication of weapon readiness. Today the weapon firing process is carried out by digital computer with elaborate displays of all relevant parameters.

== ASW Countermeasures ==
The main countermeasure the submarine has is stealth; it tries not to be detected. Against the ASW weapon itself, both active and passive countermeasures are used. The former may be a noise making jammer or a decoy providing a signal that looks like a submarine. Passive countermeasures may consist of coatings to minimize a submarine’s sonar reflections or an outer hull to provide a stand-off from its explosion. The anti-submarine weapon has to overcome these countermeasures.

== See also ==
- Anti-submarine net
- Magnetic anomaly detector

== Bibliography ==
- Blair, Clay, Silent Victory (Vol.1), The Naval Institute Press, 2001
- Lanning, Michael Lee (Lt. Col.), Senseless Secrets: The Failures of U.S. Military Intelligence from George Washington to the Present, Carol Publishing Group, 1995
- Preston, Antony, The World's Greatest Submarines, Greenwich Editions, 2005.
