= Romanian corvette Contraamiral Roman =

Turkish and Romanian naval ship (launched 2023)

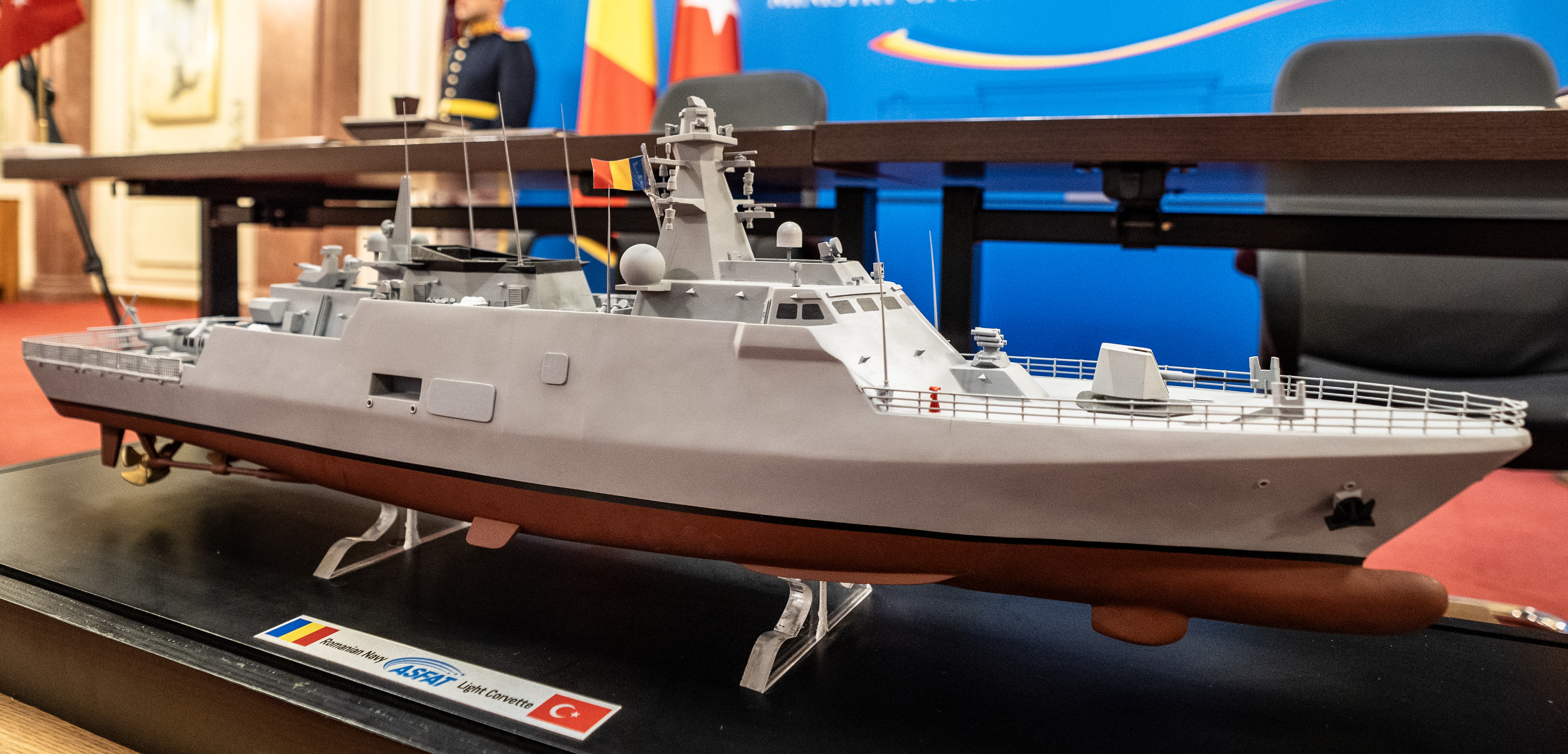
- Scale model of the Romanian Hisar-class light corvette

Turkey
- Name: TCG Akhisar
- Namesake: Akhisar, Turkey
- Builder: ASFAT
- Laid down: 15 August 2021
- Launched: 23 September 2023
- Maiden voyage: 12 December 2024
- Identification: Pennant number: P-1220
- Fate: Sold to Romania

Romania
- Name: Contraamiral Roman
- Namesake: Counter admiral August Roman
- Acquired: 3 December 2025
- Commissioned: 20 June 2026
- Identification: Pennant number: Cvt 261; MMSI number: 264800100; MarineTraffic ID: 10627407; Callsign:YQYV
- Status: In active service
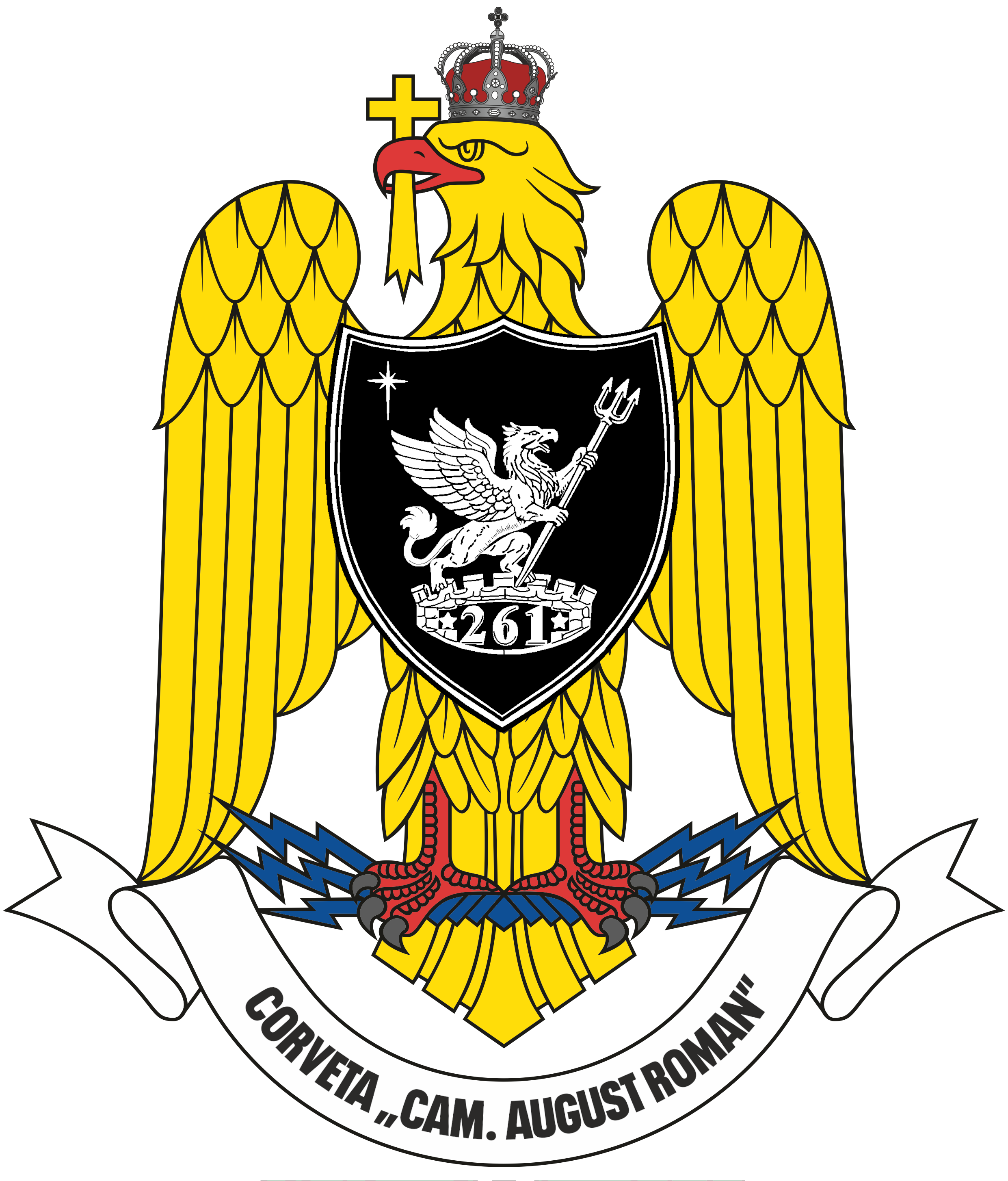
- Badge

General characteristics
- Class & type: Hisar-class offshore patrol vessel/corvette
- Displacement: 2,300 tonnes
- Length: 99.56 m (326 ft 8 in)
- Beam: 14.42 m (47 ft 4 in)
- Draught: 3.77 m (12 ft 4 in)
- Propulsion: CODELOD: 4 x diesel engines; 2 x electric motor; Generators: 4 x diesel generator
- Speed: Maximum: 24 kn (44 km/h; 28 mph); Cruise: 12 kn (22 km/h; 14 mph)
- Range: 4,500 nmi (8,300 km; 5,200 mi)
- Endurance: 21 days
- Boats & landing craft carried: 2 x RHIB
- Crew: 104
- Sensors & processing systems: Sonar: Meteksan Yakamos 2020 New Generation Mounted Sonar; Radars: Aselsan MAR-D 3D Search Radar; Aselsan 2 AKR-D Fire Control Radar; Navigation/LPI Radar
- Armament: Guns: 1 x MKE 76 mm/62-caliber gun; 1 x Aselsan GOKDENIZ CIWS; 2 x 12.7 mm Unirobotics Targan RCWS; Vertical launching systems: Mk 56 VLS; RIM-162 ESSM surface-to-air missile; Anti-ship missiles: 8 x Naval Strike Missile anti-ship missile; Anti-submarine warfare: Roketsan ASW rocket launcher system
- Aircraft carried: Hangar and platform for: 1 x Naval helicopter; 1 x Bayraktar UAV; MQ-35A V-BAT UAV

Contraamiral Roman (Cvt 261) is a Hisar-class light corvette in service with the Romanian Navy. Originally built as TCG Akhisar (P-1220) by ASFAT as part of the MILGEM project of the Turkish Navy, she was purchased by the Romanian Navy on 3 December 2025.

== History ==
Contraamiral Roman, originally named TCG Akhisar, was laid down on 15 August 2021 at the Istanbul Naval Shipyard as the lead ship of the Hisar-class offshore patrol vessels. She was launched on 23 September 2023 and carried out her maiden voyage on 12 December 2024, beginning sea trials shortly after.

After the failure of the multi-mission corvette program following disagreements on the price of constructing the ships with Naval Group in 2023, the Romanian Navy sought a fast replacement for its program, a "light corvette-type ship capable of executing a multitude of missions in the shortest possible time". In late 2024, the Romanian Ministry of Defence confirmed that the selected ship was an already built Hisar class from Turkey. Following the approval of the purchase by the Romanian Supreme Council of National Defence in March 2025, the final contract was signed on 3 December 2025, for approximately €223 million.

The ship is to be outfitted in a Romanian shipyard as a light corvette, with different systems compared to its standard OPV configuration according to the Romanian Navy specifications. One such system being the Naval Strike Missile anti-ship missile. As of May 2026, the ship was conducting training with Romanian crews. Contraamiral August Roman was officially commissioned in Romanian Navy service on 20 June 2026 and was assigned to the 50th Corvette Divizion.

The corvette arrived in the Port of Constanța on 10 July 2026. While on the voyage from Istanbul to Constanța, she also transported minister Radu Miruță who was returning from the 2026 Ankara NATO summit.

On 6 October 2026, she executed the first shootings with her onboard artillery at sea as part of training events simulating engagements with naval and aerial drones, as well as combat with enemy ships and aircraft.
