= TCG Koçhisar =

TCG Koçhisar is the name of the following ships of the Turkish Navy:

- TCG Koçhisar (P-116), ex-USS PC-1643
- TCG Koçhisar (P-1221), a Hisar-class offshore patrol vessel commissioned in 2025

== See also ==
- Koçhisar (disambiguation)
