= Hisar-class offshore patrol vessel =

Class of Turkish patrol vessels

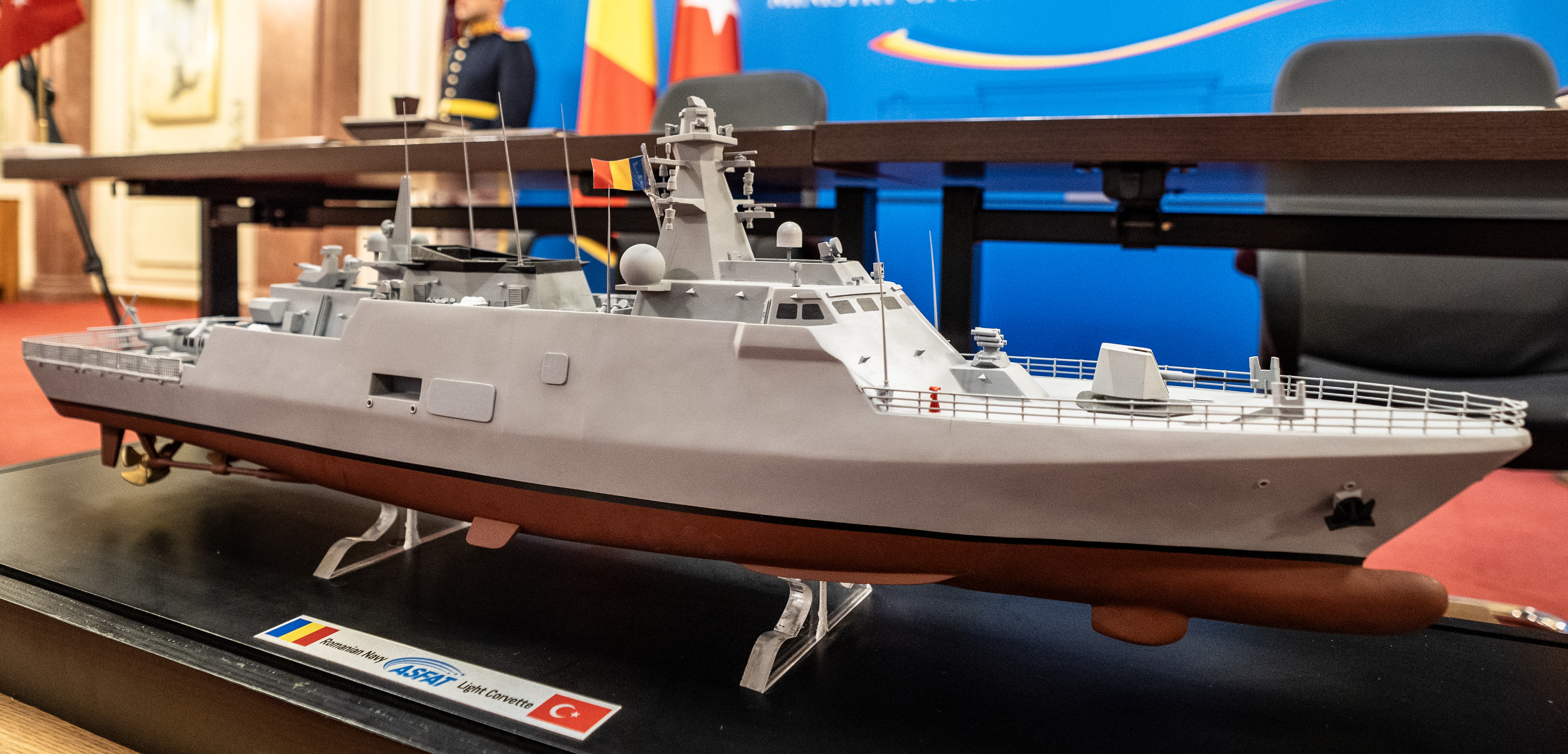
- Hisar-class corvette scale model

Class overview
- Name: Hisar class
- Builders: ASFAT
- Planned: 10
- Active: 2

General characteristics
- Type: Offshore patrol vessel; Corvette (full armament configuration)
- Displacement: 2,300 tonnes
- Length: 99.56 m (326 ft 8 in)
- Beam: 14.42 m (47 ft 4 in)
- Draft: 3.77 m (12 ft 4 in)
- Propulsion: CODELOD: 4 x Diesel; 2 x Electric Motor; Generators: 4 x Diesel Generator
- Speed: Maximum: 24 kn (44 km/h; 28 mph); Cruise: 12 kn (22 km/h; 14 mph)
- Range: 4.500 nmi (8.334 km; 5.179 mi)
- Endurance: 21 days
- Boats & landing craft carried: 2 x RHIB
- Complement: 1 x Naval helicopter; 1 x UAV
- Crew: 104
- Sensors & processing systems: Sonar: METEKSAN YAKAMOS 2020 New Generation Mounted Sonar; Radars: ASELSAN MAR-D 3D Search Radar; ASELSAN 2 AKR-D Fire Control Radar; Navigation/LPI Radar; Systems: ASELSAN Piri – KATS (Infrared Search and Trace System); ASELSAN DENİZGÖZÜ OCTOPUS-S Electro-optical Search System; TÜBİTAK YELKOVAN Radar Electronic Support System; Combat Management System: HAVELSAN ADVENT SYS
- Armament: Full armament configuration: Guns: 1 x MKE 76 mm/62-caliber gun; 1 x Aselsan GOKDENIZ CIWS; 2 x UNIROBOTICS Targan 12.7 mm RCWS; Vertical launcher systems: 8 x MiDLAS Vertical Launching System (VLS) (optional); 8 x HISAR-D RF air defence missiles; Anti-ship missiles: 8 x Atmaca anti-ship missile; Anti-submarine warfare: Roketsan ASW rocket launcher system
- Aircraft carried: Hangar and platform for: S-70B Seahawk ASW helicopter; Unmanned aerial vehicles (UAV)

The Hisar-class offshore patrol vessels are patrol vessels / corvette that will allow the Turkish Navy to perform cost-effective patrol missions. They are being developed for the Turkish Navy and export within the scope of MILGEM project.

== Design ==
The Hisar-class patrol ships were developed on the basis of the design of the Ada-class corvettes. These ships, which have similar tonnage & length, are designed to perform particularly economical & effective tasks in intelligence, surveillance, reconnaissance, combating piracy, protection of marine resources, establishment of maritime security, humanitarian assistance in natural disasters, and search and rescue missions.

== Ships in the class ==
Name	Pennant	Builder	Laid down	Launched	Commissioned	Status
Contraamiral Roman (ex-TCG Akhisar)	261 (ex-P-1220)	Istanbul Naval Shipyard	15 August 2021	23 September 2023	20 June 2026	Active
TCG Koçhisar	P-1221	Istanbul Naval Shipyard	25 December 2022	23 September 2023	20 June 2026	Active
TCG Seferihisar	P-1222	Dearsan/Desan/Özata Shipyards				Planned
TBD	P-1223	Dearsan/Desan/Özata Shipyards				Planned
TBD	P-1224	Dearsan/Desan/Özata Shipyards				Planned
TBD	P-1225	Dearsan/Desan/Özata Shipyards				Planned

== Operators ==
Turkey

- Turkish Navy

Romania

- Romanian Navy
