= TRG-300 Tiger =

- Type: Rocket artillery
- Place of origin: Turkey

Production history
- Manufacturer: ROKETSAN
- Produced: 2000–present
- Variants: See Variants

Specifications
- Caliber: 300 mm (12 in)
- Barrels: 4
- Maximum firing range: 20–120 km (12–75 mi)
- Warhead: High explosives + Steel ball
- Detonation mechanism: Point Detonating and Proximity
- Propellant: Composite solid
- Guidance system: GPS + GLONASS aided INS
- Accuracy: ≤ 10 m
- Launch platform: MAN 6x6 truck

The TRG-300 Tiger (also known as TRG-300 Kasirga) is a Turkish guided multiple launch rocket system manufactured by the ROKETSAN corporation. The system has four 300 mm rocket launcher tubes and its rockets can hit a maximum range of 120 km.

== Synopsis ==
Typical Tiger battery systems are composed of a Command and Control Vehicle with between six and nine launcher vehicles (F-302T) and an equal number of resupply and reloading vehicles. TRG-300 Missile can be launched from ROKETSAN Multi-Barrel Rocket Launcher and other platforms with compatible interfaces. The system has aerodynamic control with electromechanical actuation system.

The TRG-300 Tiger MBRL is based on Chinese WS-1 (Wei Shi; Guardian), with some modifications on the design with launcher very similar to the WS-1B 's launcher. In Turkish land forces service, the 300 mm TRG-300 Tiger MBRL system provides long range fire support.

The TRG-300 Tiger MBRLS consists of two key parts: The launcher system (T-300) and the rocket, TRG-300. The T-300 MBRL is based on the German MAN Diesel (6×6) 26.372 10t cross-country truck chassis. Combat weight, complete with four rockets, is 23t. The launcher vehicle's cabin windows are provided with shutters which are lowered before the rockets are launched.

This MAN (6×6) also serves as T-122 launch platform for Turkish land forces command F-302T.

== History ==
In 1997, an agreement was signed with CPMIEC (Chinese Precision Machinery Import and Export Company) for the joint development and manufacture of an offshoot of the WS-1 system. The Kasirga system was first commissioned in the year 2000.

In 2016, the TRG-300 Tiger system was sold to Azerbaijan.

In March 2019, ROKETSAN secured a contract to supply a regiment of medium-range guided multiple rocket launchers to Bangladesh. According to the statement given by the Bangladesh Chief of General Staff Gen.18 units have been delivered to the Bangladesh Army in June 2021.

== Specifications ==
=== Block 1A ===
- Range: 30–120 km (19–75 mi)
- Weight: 585 kg (1,290 lb)
- Length: 5.6 m (18 ft 4 in)
- Accuracy: 10 m CEP

=== Block 2 ===
- Range: 20–90 km (12–56 mi)
- Weight: 660 kg (1,460 lb)
- Length: 6 m (19 ft 8 in)
- Warhead weight: 180 kg (400 lb)
- Warhead effective radius: ≥ 80 m
- Accuracy: 10 m CEP

=== Block 3 ===
- Range: 30–120 km (19–75 mi)
- Weight: 585 kg (1,290 lb)
- Warhead weight: 105 kg (231 lb)
- Warhead effective radius: ≥ 70 m
- Accuracy: 10 m CEP

== Operators ==
=== Current operators ===
- Azerbaijan: 20 units
- Bangladesh: >36 units (sources vary)
- Turkey
- United Arab Emirates: 3 units.
- Libya: 4 units or more
