= Sungur =

Turkish surface-to-air missile

Sungur / PORSAV
- Type: Man-portable air-defense system SHORAD; Very short-range air-to-air missile
- Place of origin: Turkey

Service history
- In service: 2022-present
- Wars: Syria Civil War; Russian invasion of Ukraine

Production history
- Manufacturer: Roketsan
- Developed into: Levent
- Produced: 2022-present

Specifications
- Mass: 14.5 kg
- Length: 1.68 m
- Diameter: 82 mm
- Warhead: High explosive semi armor piercing
- Detonation mechanism: Programmable impact fuze
- Engine: Two-Stage solid-propellant rocket
- Operational range: 500 m to 8 km
- Flight altitude: 4 km (sea level)
- Guidance system: Imaging infrared homing
- Launch platform: MANPADS; Ground vehicles Naval platforms Unmanned aerial vehicles (UAVs)
- References: Roketsan

Sungur (lit. 'Falcon') is a Turkish fifth-generation fire-and-forget short range air defense (SHORAD) and man-portable air-defense system (MANPADS) developed by Roketsan as Turkey's first domestically produced MANPADS.

== History ==
The Sungur project began in 2013 with a contract signed between the Turkish Ministry of National Defense and Roketsan to fulfill the requirements of the Turkish Land Forces Command.

After successful development and testing phases, the system achieved initial operational capability in July 2020. The first batch of the vehicle-mounted Sungur variant was delivered in the second half of 2021.

A live-fire test was conducted in July 2022 at the Sinop Test Range, resulting in a successful hit against a Banshee Jet 80 target aircraft. Delivery of the MANPADS variant to the Land Forces Command also occurred in July 2022.

As of March 2024, the Ministry of National Defence confirmed successful deliveries of various quantities of the MANPADS variant to the Turkish Land Forces Command, with inspections and acceptance activities completed.

As of March 8, 2024, Roketsan has begun receiving international inquiries for the Sungur MANPADS, marking Turkey's first ever export of such a system.

== Design ==
The Sungur system has a maximum range of 8 kilometers, which is considered the longest among comparable systems. It utilizes an imaging infrared seeker that enables lock-on before launch. The missile is equipped with a high-explosive, partial-piercing warhead and employs a direct attack profile to minimize flight time.

The Sungur platform integration is flexible, supporting deployment from land-based vehicles, naval vessels, and unmanned aerial vehicles (UAVs). Target acquisition is facilitated by voice and symbology instructions on a tracking screen. The system is designed for interoperability, capable of integrating with the HERIKKS Air Defence Early Warning Command and Control System. It also features upgradeable Identification Friend or Foe (IFF) equipment. Its operational profile allows it to engage low-signature targets, contributing to asymmetric warfare capabilities.

The Sungur platform is capable of engaging targets at altitudes up to 4 kilometers above sea level and is designed to counter fixed-wing aircraft and unmanned rotary-wing aircraft (UAVs). Its operational mode is Lock-On Before Launch, making it a fire-and-forget system. The seeker is resistant to countermeasures, features automatic target tracking, and operates within a ±40-degree visual angle.

The missile is armed with a high-explosive, semi-armor-piercing warhead fitted with a programmable impact fuze. Both the warhead and the propulsion system are classified as Insensitive Munitions (Type 4). The propulsion consists of a launch engine, which separates within the launch tube, and a two-stage solid propellant flight engine. Terminal guidance is provided by an Imaging Infra-Red (IIR) system, enabling high manoeuvrability and rapid performance. The system is integrated on land platforms, naval vessels, and unmanned aerial vehicles.

== Variants ==
=== PORSAV ===
MANPADS version of the Sungur capable of being operated by a single person without any tripod or stand.

== Adoption ==
The Sungur system is designed for short-range air defense of mobile/fixed units and facilities on the battlefield and in the rear area.

Entering service with the Turkish Armed Forces in July 2022, the Sungur is set to replace their existing FIM-92 Stinger systems.

== Users ==
- Turkey
- Ukraine
