= Koçhisar =

Koçhisar can refer to:

- Koçhisar, Alaca
- Koçhisar, Sandıklı
- Koçhisar Dam
- Battle of Koçhisar
- TCG Koçhisar, ships of the Turkish Navy
