= Levent (missile) =

Turkish Family of short-range to long-range surface to air missile systems

- Type: SAM-based CIWS
- Place of origin: Turkey

Service history
- Used by: Turkey

Production history
- Designed: 2020-2025
- Manufacturer: Roketsan
- Developed from: Sungur
- Produced: Prototype

Specifications
- Mass: 75 kg
- Length: 3.2 m
- Diameter: 128 mm
- Operational range: 11 km
- Flight altitude: 6 km
- Guidance system: Infrared homing
- Launch platform: Close-in weapon system Naval platforms

Levent (from Levend) is an air defense missile developed by the Turkish state-owned company Roketsan for use on sea-based platforms. Levent is designed to be used in a point defense system, namely close-in weapon system (CIWS), developed by Roketsan. Levent's first test firing on a sea platform was successfully carried out on March 24, 2025. It is one of two Turkish missile-based CIWSs, along with the GÖKSUR.

== Design and development ==
The Levent missile was developed based on the Sungur shoulder-launched surface-to-air missile produced by Roketsan as a close-in air defense missile for the new generation ships of the Turkish Navy. It was first introduced to the public in 2021. Its first tests were conducted in 2023. The first firing test on a ship was successfully carried out in March 2025. The testing process is expected to be completed and mass production to begin in 2025.
