= Roketsan Research Center =

Roketsan Research Center, officially Roketsan Satellite Launch, Space Systems and Advanced Technologies Research Center (Turkish: Roketsan Uydu Fırlatma, Uzay Sistemleri ve İleri Teknolojiler Araştırma Merkezi) is a research center of the Turkish defense systems company Roketsan for space-related technologies. Based in Ankara, it was established on 30 August 2020.

One of the projects of the research center is the development of a Micro Satellite Launch System (MSLS) capable of delivering microsatellites with a mass up to 100 kg (220 lb) into Low Earth orbits with an altitude of minimum 400 km (250 mi). It is planned that the system will be available in 2025.
