= T-122 Sakarya =

Turkish multiple launch rocket system

T-122 Sakarya multiple rocket launcher
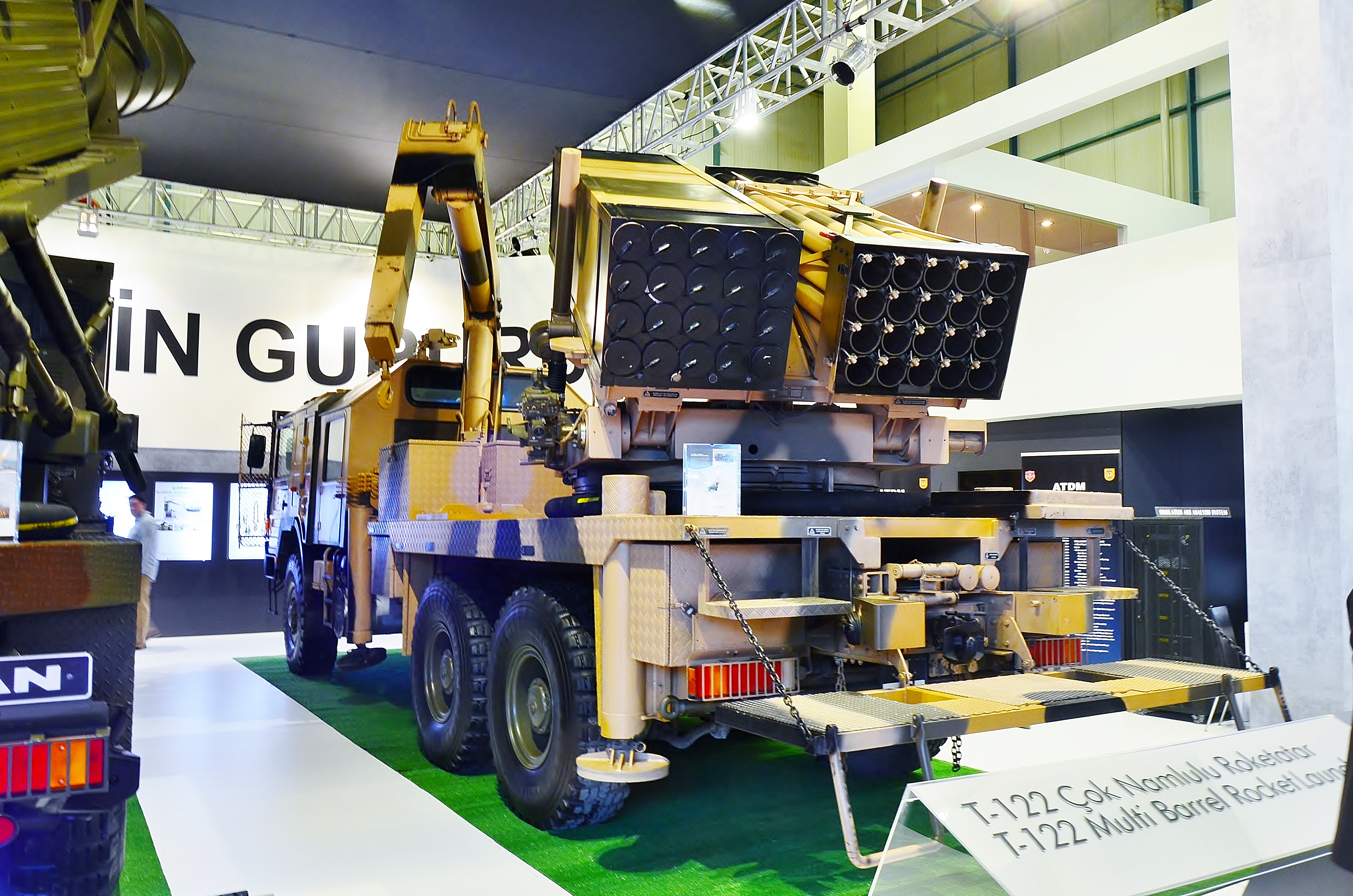
- T-122 Sakarya
- Type: Self-propelled multiple rocket launcher
- Place of origin: Turkey

Service history
- In service: 1997–present
- Used by: Turkish Army
- Wars: Syrian Civil War; 2020 Nagorno-Karabakh war Turkish military intervention in the Second Libyan Civil War

Production history
- Designer: ROKETSAN
- Designed: 1990's
- Manufacturer: ROKETSAN
- Produced: 1995 (prototype); 1997-present

Specifications
- Mass: 22.2 tonnes
- Length: 9.20 m (30 ft 2 in)
- Width: 2.5 m (8 ft 2 in)
- Height: 3.1 m (10 ft 2 in)
- Crew: 5
- Caliber: 122.4 mm (4.8 in)
- Barrels: 40
- Maximum firing range: 36 km (22 mi) (at Sea Level), 40 km (25 mi) (at 600 m above sea level)
- Secondary armament: M2 Browning
- Suspension: 6x6 or 8×8 wheeled
- Operational range: 970km
- Maximum speed: 75km/h

The T-122 Sakarya is a family of Turkish 122 mm multiple launch rocket systems developed by ROKETSAN.

== Overview ==
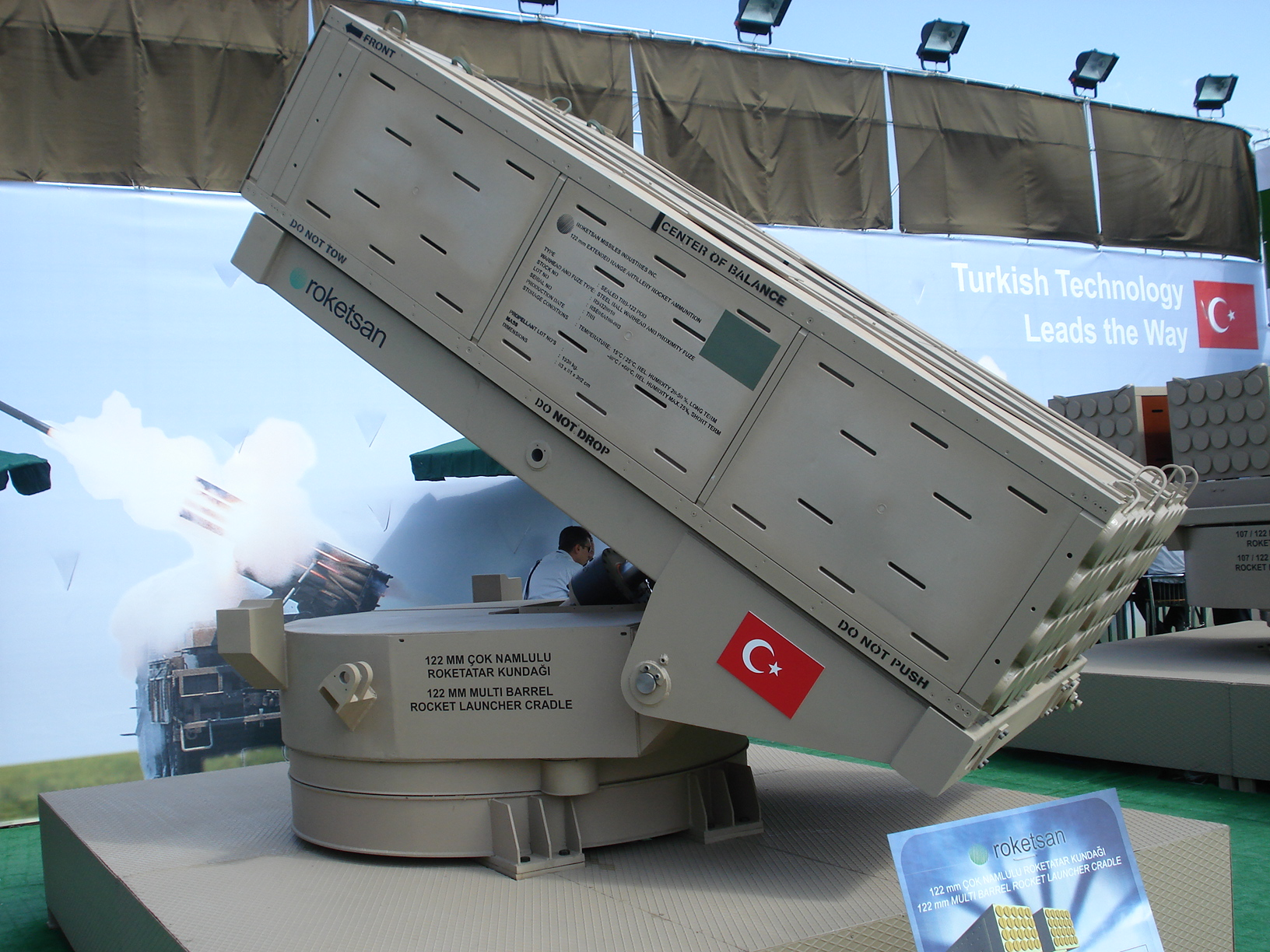
T-122 Rocket Pods on Display

As part of the modernization drive undertaken by the Turkish Military in the 1980s and 90s several new rocket systems were developed for the needs of the Turkish army. Prototypes of the system were revealed in 1995 with the first vehicles undertaking trials and evaluation in 1996. Production commenced in 1997.

The system consists of two pods of 122-mm launch tubes which are hydraulically traversed and elevated. It is equipped with a state-of-the-art fire control system which calculates firing data automatically for rockets with different warheads and is capable of storing up to 20 target coordinates. The vehicle can fire rockets singly or in salvo, with a full forty rocket launch taking less than 80 seconds and blanketing a target area of 500 m × 500 m. In addition the later versions of the T-122 features an integral hydraulic crane which allows reloading of rockets pods within five minutes.

The rockets for the system were developed and manufactured by MKEK and ROKETSAN, though the T-122 can fire 122mm rockets from the BM-21 and associated systems. Indigenous rockets are available with HE-FRAG or cluster warheads which can contain either anti-personnel or anti-tank submunitions. Maximum range of fire with extended-range rockets is up to 40 km.

== Variants ==
- TR-122: It has a warhead effective radius of ≥ 20 m, warhead weight of 18.4 kg.
- TRB-122: It has a warhead effective radius of ≥ 40 m, warhead weight of 18 kg.
- TRG-122: Guided rocket. It has an accuracy of ≤ 10 m, warhead effective radius of ≥ 40 m, warhead weight of 13.5 kg with a minimum range of 13 km and maximum range of 30 km.
- TRLG-122: Laser guided missile. The missile is same as TRG-122 along with the added laser seeker for laser guidance. Accuracy of the missile increased to ≤ 2 m.
- İHA-122 : Air-launched supersonic ballistic missile. İHA-122 missiles are equipped with TV and laser-guided heads.

First production models of the T-122 Sakarya launcher vehicle were based on the German MAN 26.281 heavy utility truck. An improved variant of the system was revealed in 2005 which is based on the MAN 26.372 truck which is also used as the launcher vehicle for the J-600T Yıldırım short-range ballistic missile. The improved system is fitted to use factory-sealed disposable rocket pods that are specifically designed to be maintenance free, resistant to handling and environmental conditions and allow rapid reloading. The updated system can also be fitted with armour and an NBC system.

== Operators ==
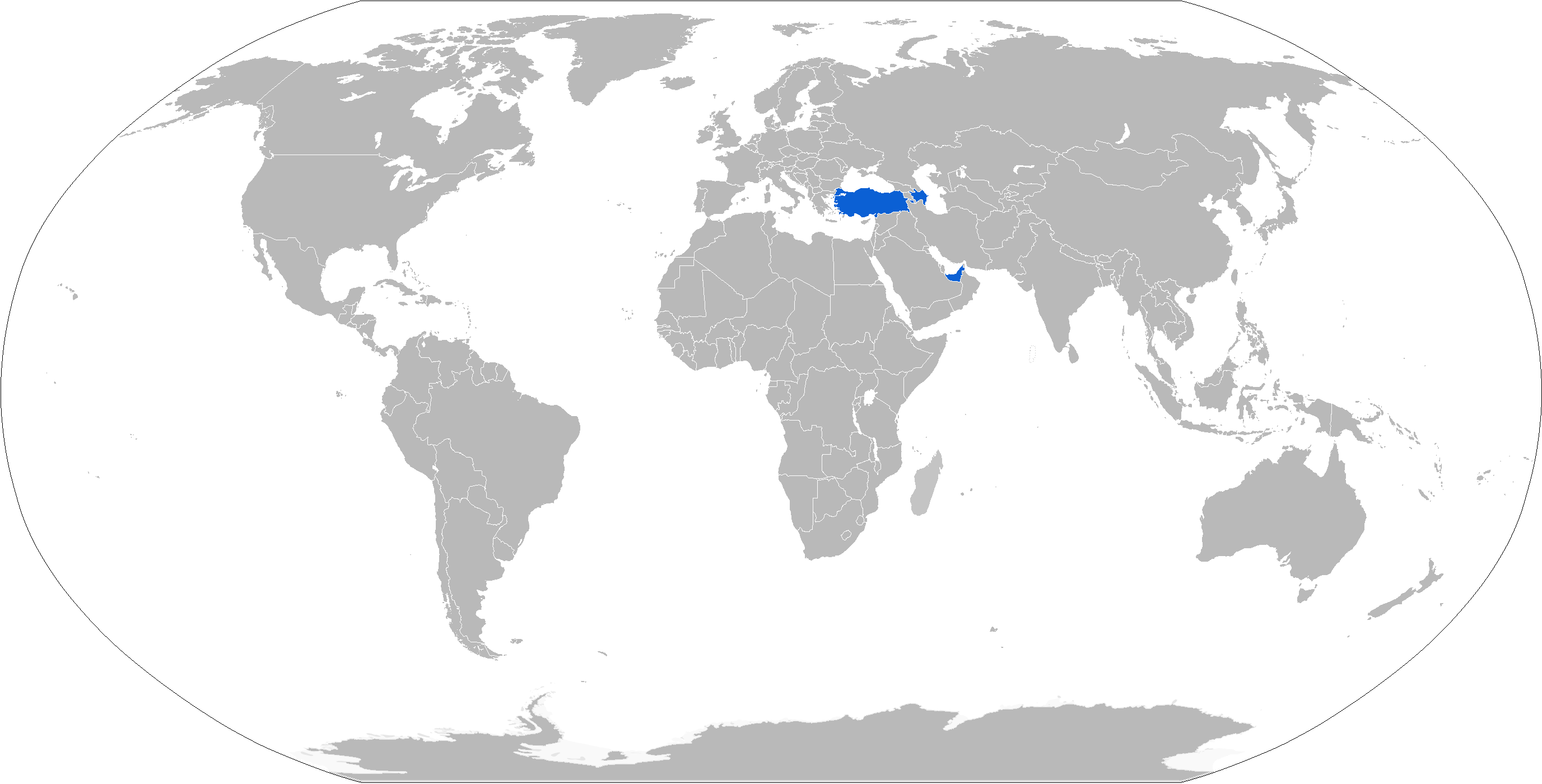
Map with T-122 operators in blue

- Azerbaijan
- Turkey: >140
- Ukraine: Unknown number provided to Ukraine with one reported destroyed in September 2023.
- Libya: large nunbers were transferred

== See also ==
- BM-21 Grad – (Soviet Union)
- K136 Kooryong – (South Korea)
- LAROM – (Romania)
- M-77 Oganj – (Yugoslavia)
- Pinaka multi-barrel rocket launcher – (India)
- RM-70 multiple rocket launcher – (Czechoslovakia)
- RS-122 – (Georgia)
- PHL-81 – (China)
- Valkiri – (South Africa)
- WR-40 Langusta – (Poland)
