= Roketsan =

Turkish aerospace and defense company

Roketsan A.Ş.
- Type: Joint-stock company
- Industry: Defense; Technology; Software; Aerospace
- Founded: 1988, Ankara
- Headquarters: Ankara, Turkey
- Key people: Murat Ikinci (General Manager)
- Products: Rockets; Missiles; Cruise missiles Mortars; Propellants; Peripheral test Simulation systems
- Revenue: ▲$1.39 billion (2024) ▲$>2 billion (preliminary, 2025)
- Number of employees: 5000 (2000 in R&D)(2024)
- Website: www.roketsan.com.tr

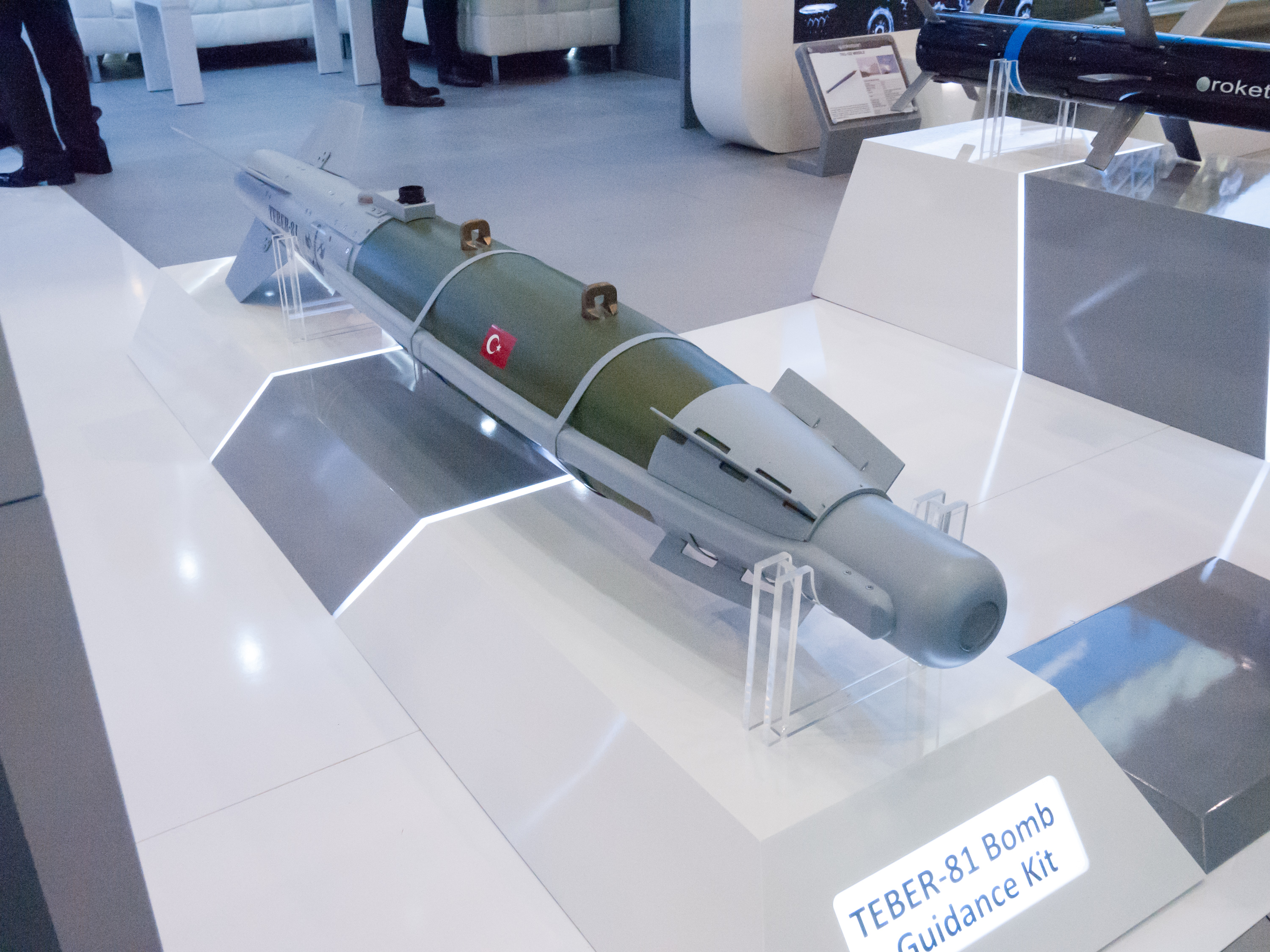
Teber 81 Bomb Guidance Kit

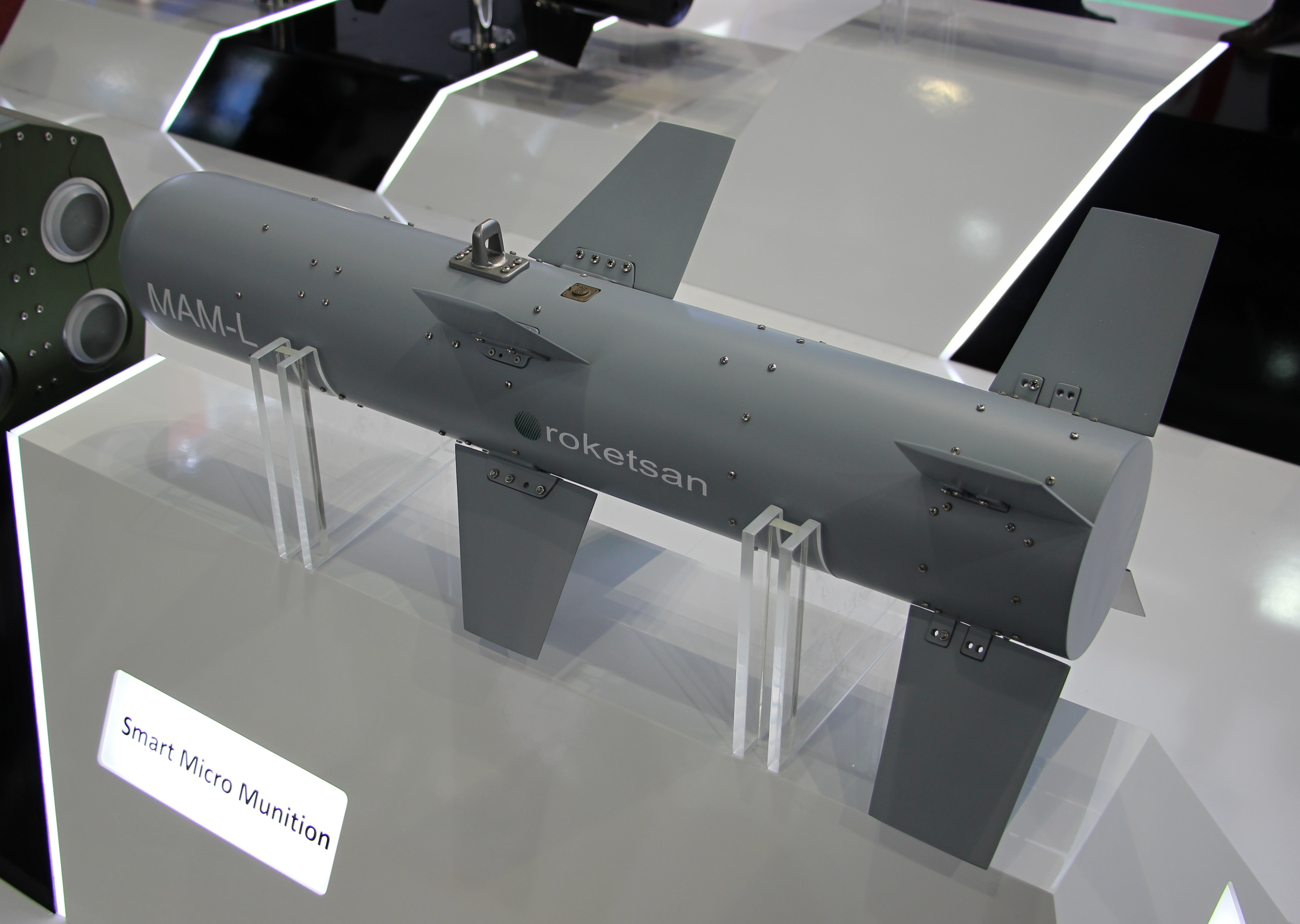
Smart Micro Munition (MAM-L) platform with low payload capacity, e.g. unmanned aerial vehicles

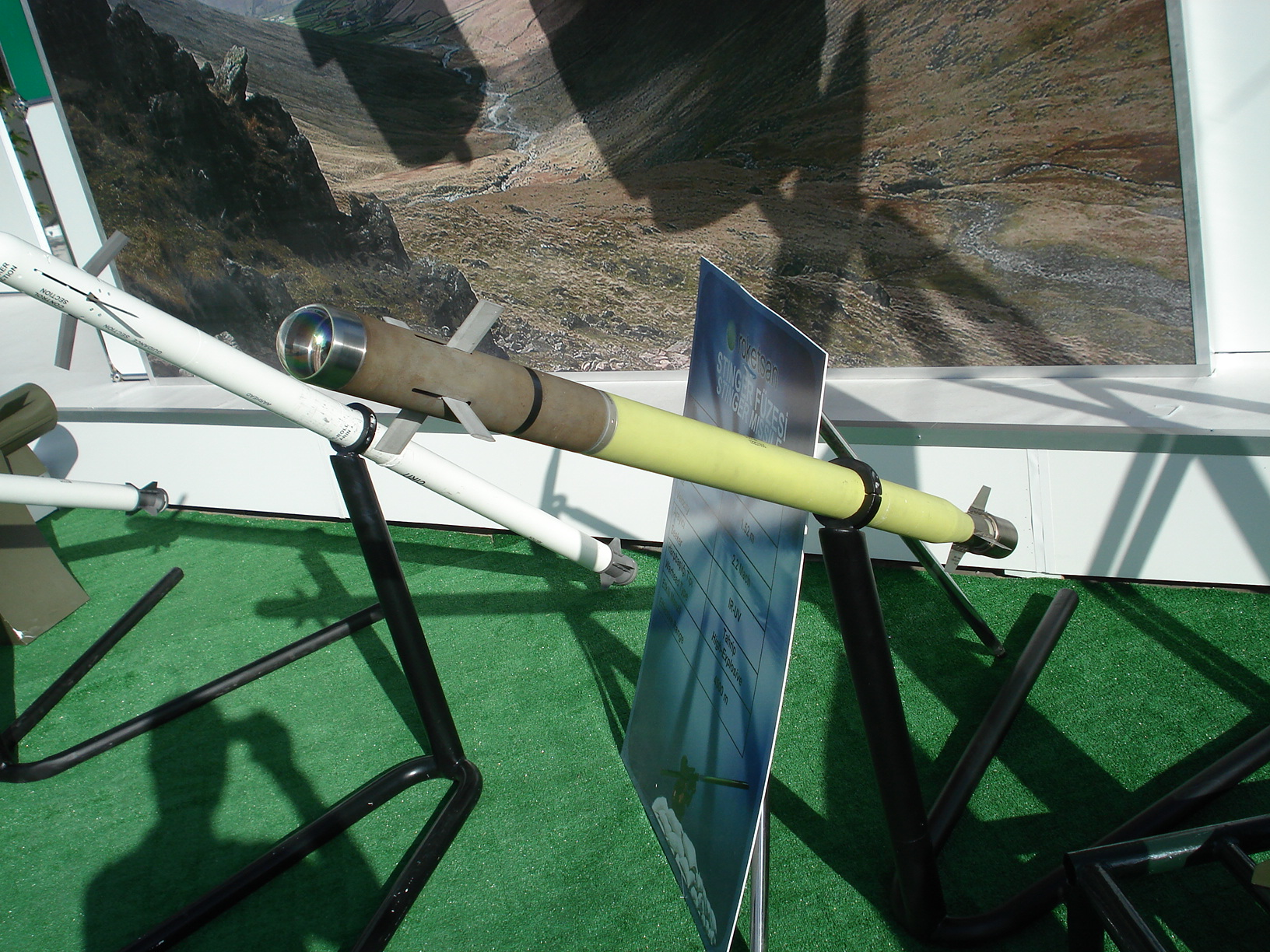
FIM-92 Stingers made under license by Roketsan

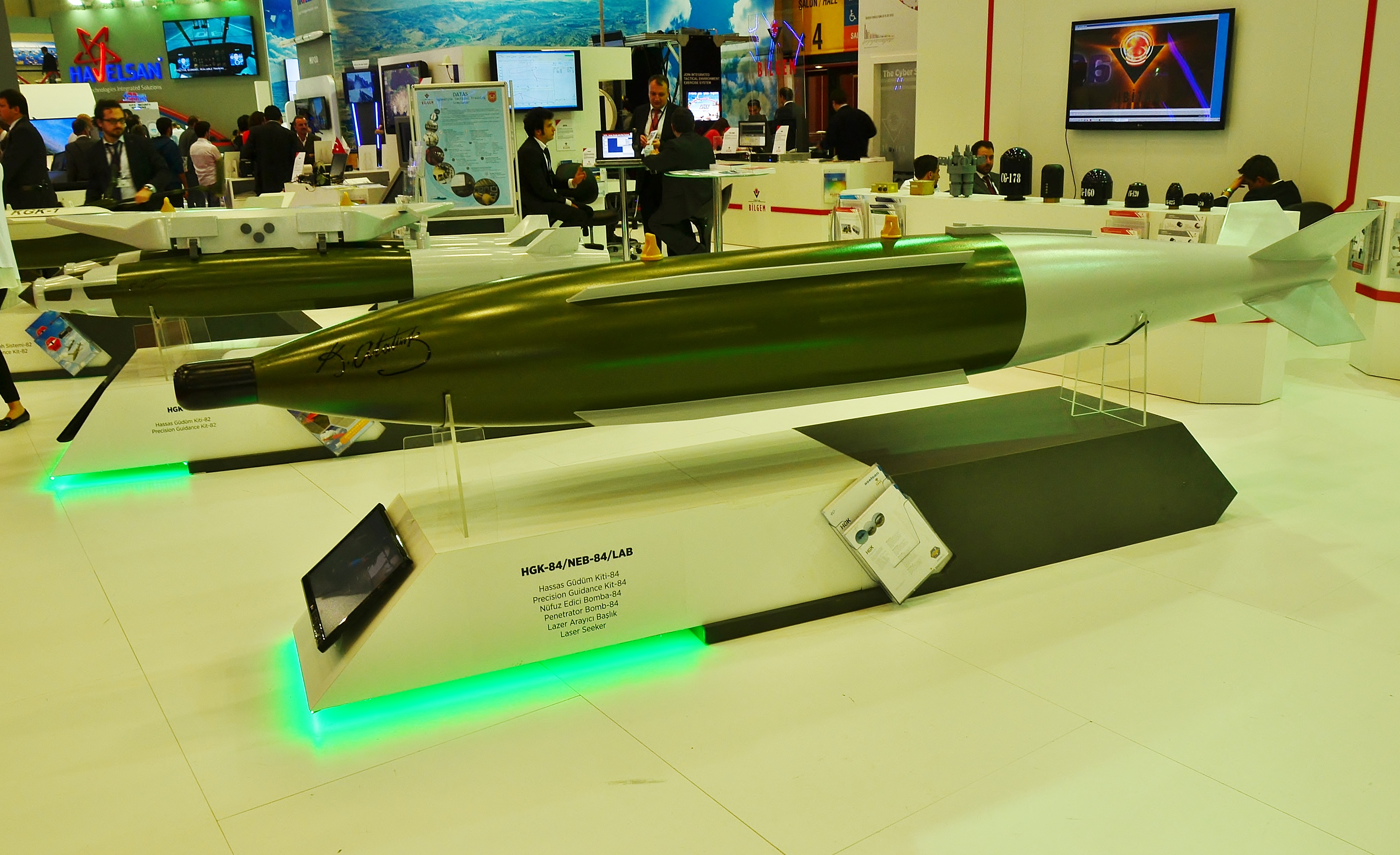
Precision guidance kit HGK-84, penetrator bomb NEB-84 and laser seeker LAB of Roketsan

Roketsan (Roket Sanayii ve Ticaret A.Ş.) is a Turkish weapons manufacturer and defense contractor based in Ankara, Turkey. Incorporated in 1988 by Turkey's Defense Industry Executive Committee (SSİK) to establish the nation's industrial base on missile technology, the company has quickly risen to become one of Turkey's top 500 industrial corporations.

Roketsan's current share holders include Turkish Armed Forces Foundation (55.5%), ASELSAN (15%), MKEK (15%), Vakıflar Bankası (10%), HAVELSAN (4.5%). Roketsan is best known for its wide range of guided and unguided rockets as well as guided missiles such as Bora, Tayfun, Atmaca, Rapier and ESSM missiles and provides technology and engineering solutions for other integrated civilian and military platforms. Recent developments highlight small-diameter precision-strike bombs for unmanned aerial vehicles.

Roketsan is the only Turkish company to have obtained CMMI/ DEV 3 (Capability Maturity Model Integration – for Development) approval for all its design and development processes.

It was ranked 96th in 2018 and 89th in 2019 in Defense News' most valuable defense industry companies list. In 2023, it was ranked 80th.

The company is one of the organizers of the Teknofest Aerospace and Technology Festival.

== History ==
Roketsan, was founded on 14 June 1988 by the decision of the Defense Industries Executive Committee for the purpose of “Establishing a leading institution in the country for designing, developing and manufacturing rockets and missiles”.

Roketsan signed a contract in 2013 to build the project of the national UFS Space Launch System. In 2013, the Government of Turkey approved the construction of its first satellite launching center by Roketsan. In August 2020, the Roketsan Satellite Launch, Space Systems and Advanced Technologies Research Center and Explosive Raw Material Production Facility for HMX and RDX production were established. It was said that 55 tons of the country's annual raw material need of 80 tons will be produced nationally in these facilities by the end of the year.

On 29 June 2021, the governments of Turkey and Bangladesh signed a defence memorandum of understanding for the export of Roketsan products to Bangladesh, according to İsmail Demir, president of Presidency of Defense Industries. Roketsan had already delivered the TRG-300 Tiger MLRS to the Bangladesh Army in June 2021 in a separate deal. Bangladesh was set to become one of the top defence equipment customers of Turkey and Roketsan in the following few years. In October 2021, the Bangladesh Army received a second batch of the TRG-300 Tiger missile system. Roketsan started the construction of a new facility on a 9,500-acre land in Kırıkkale in December 2022. Roketsan decided to increase its production capacity by investing $407 million in Ankara and Kırıkkale in 2025.

On April 7, 2026, the Lalahan Missile Integration Facility in Ankara and the Fuel Production Facility in Kırıkkale were inaugurated with the participation of President Erdoğan. It was announced that the total cost of the facilities exceeded 1 billion dollars and that the factories would provide employment for more than 3,000 people. It was stated that with the opening of these facilities, Türkiye's missile production capacity would increase fivefold.

In June 2026, at the Eurosatory defence exhibition, the Czechoslovak Group (CSG) presented the Trident multi-layer air defence system. The modular system is designed to counter a range of aerial threats, including aircraft, helicopters, cruise missiles and unmanned aerial vehicles. It can integrate surface-to-air missiles, gun-based systems, counter-UAS elements and electronic warfare capabilities.

Roketsan is a strategic partner in the project, supplying short-, medium- and long-range surface-to-air guided missiles together with their transport and launch containers. Other contributors include Excalibur International (main system integrator), Retia (radars and command-and-control systems), and Tatra Trucks/Tatra Defence (chassis and armoured platforms).

== Shareholders ==
Shareholder structure of Roketsan is:

- Turkish Armed Forces Foundation - 55%
- ASELSAN - 15%
- Makine Kimya Endüstrisi Kurumu - 15%
- Vakıfbank - 10%
- Other - 5%

== Products ==
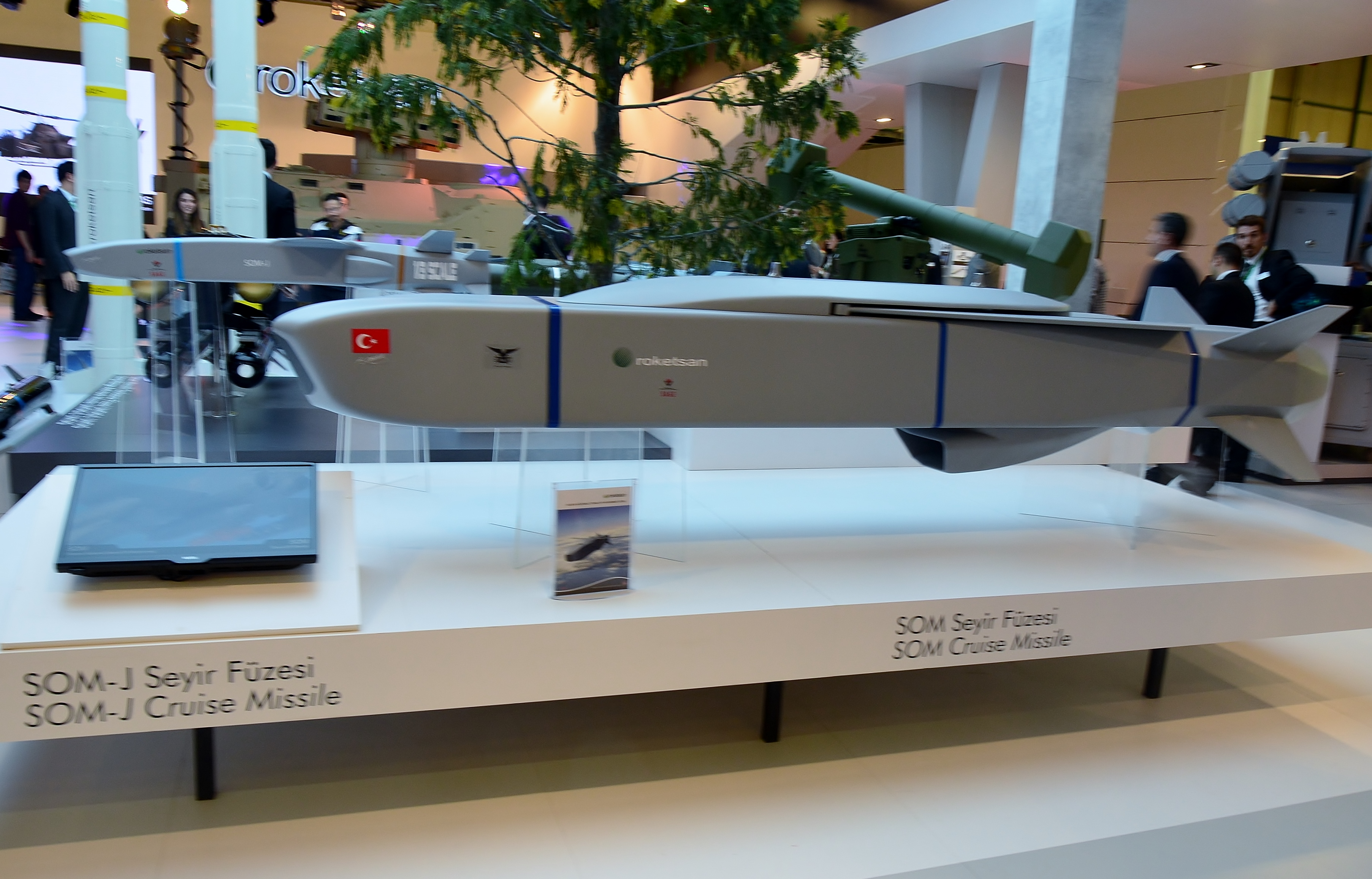
Cruise missile SOM-J at the Roketsan stand at IDEF 2015

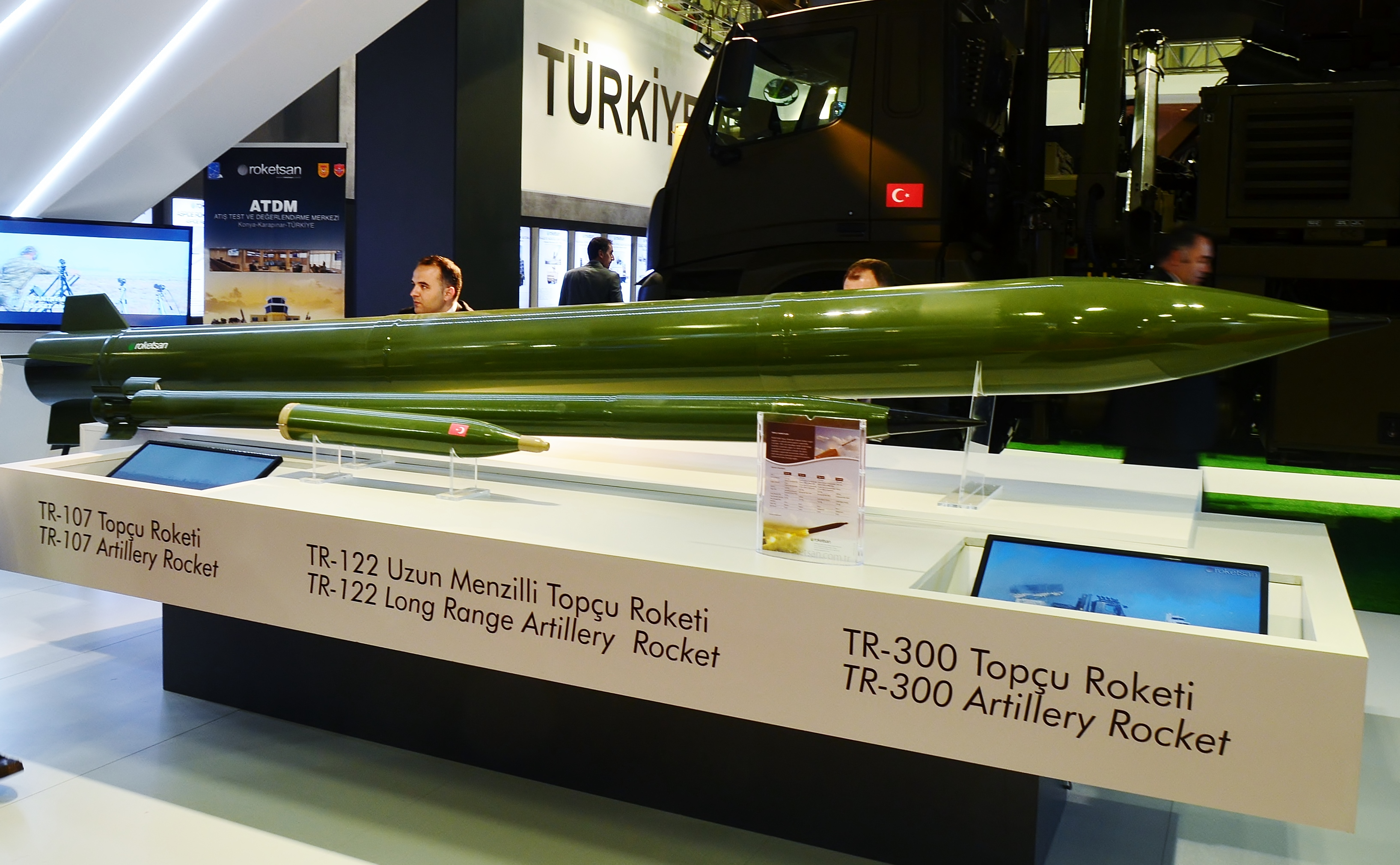
Artillery rockets TR-107, TR-122 and TR-300 at the Roketsan stand at IDEF 2015

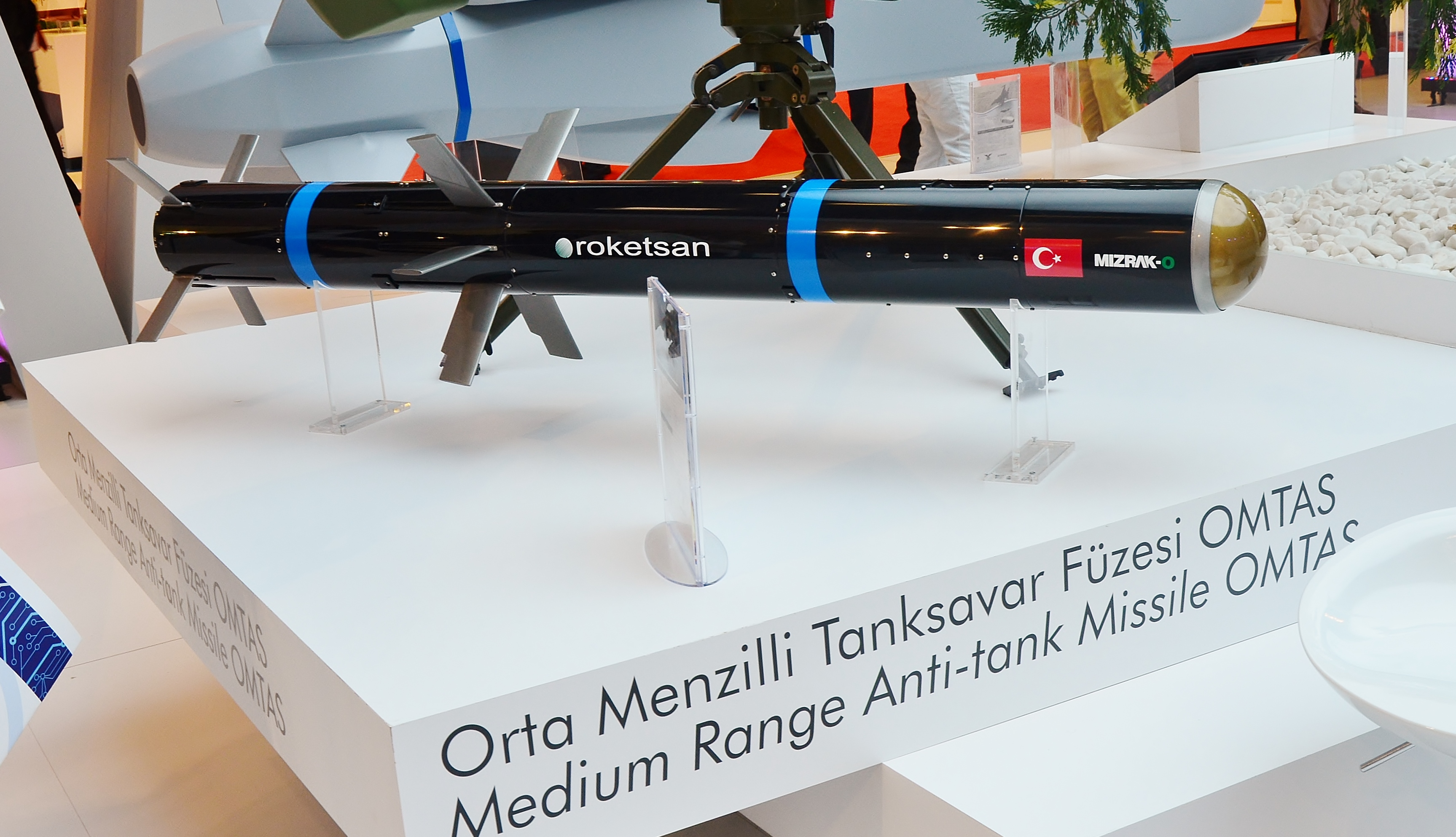
Medium range anti-tank missile OMTAS at the Roketsan stand at IDEF 2015

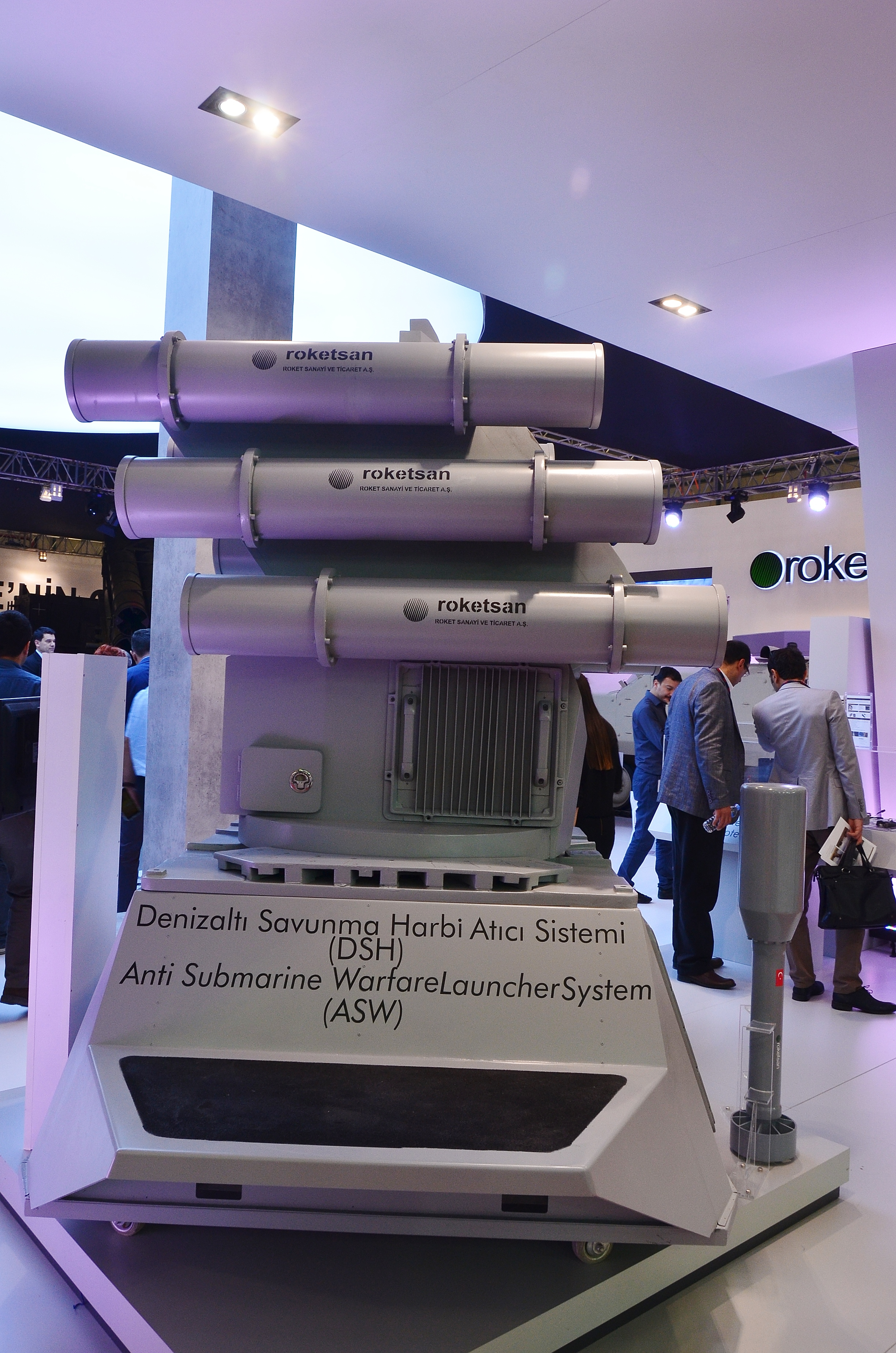
Roketsan ASW rocket launcher system at the Roketsan stand at IDEF 2015

Land Systems
Name	Type	Range
Base Bleed Unit (DYÜ)	Range Extender for Artillery Shells	+%30
TRGK-30	Guidance Kit	40–90 km
Artillery Rockets	Artillery Rocket	TR-107 : 3–11+ km TR-122 : 16–36 km TRB-122 :16–36 km
T-122 Sakarya	Multiple rocket launcher	16–40 km
T-107	Multiple rocket launcher	3–40 km
Multi Caliber Rocket Launcher MCL	Multi Purpose Rocket Launcher	10–280 km
TRG-300	Guided rocket artillery	Block I: 30–120 km Block II: 20–90 km
TRG-122	Guided rocket artillery	13–30 km
TRLG-122	Laser-guided rocket artillery	13–30 km
TRG-230	Guided rocket artillery	20–70 km
TRLG-230	Laser-guided rocket artillery	20–70 or 150 km
J-600T Yıldırım	Ballistic missile	Block l: 150 km Block ll: 300 km Block lll: 900 km Block lV: 2500 km
Bora (missile)	Tactical ballistic missile	Block l: 80–280 km Block ll: 100–360 km
Tayfun (missile)	Short-range ballistic missile	380–800 km
Cenk (missile)	Medium-range ballistic missile	400–1000 km
Air Defense Systems
Name	Type	Range
ALKA Directed Energy Weapon System (YESS)	Directed Energy Weapon System	Laser: 500 m Electromagnetic Destruction System (ETS): 1.000 m Electromagnetic Jamming System (EKS): 4.000 m
Hisar-A	Air Defense Missile System	2–15 km
Hisar-O	Air Defense Missile System	3–25 km
Hisar-RF	Air Defense Missile System	3–40 km
SİPER	Air Defense Missile System	30–150 km
Levent	SAM-based CIWS	2–11 km
Sungur / PorSav	MANPADS	500 m–8 km
Licensed production of FIM-92 Stingers	MANPADS	4.8 km+
Naval Systems
Name	Type	Range
ASW rocket launcher system	Submarine Defense Rocket	Laser: 500–2.000 m
Atmaca	Long Range Anti-ship missile	> 250 km
Çakır	Medium range Anti-ship missile	150+ km
AKYA 533mm	Heavy Torpedo	50 km range
Roketsan Orka 324 mm	Lightweight Torpedo	25 km range
HIZIR	Torpedo Countermeasure System	Aselsan joint production
TORK	Anti-Torpedo	Aselsan joint production
ZOKA	Acoustic torpedo countermeasure jammers and decoys	Aselsan joint production
Precision Guided Missiles
Name	Type	Range
Roketsan Cirit	Laser Guided Anti-Tank Missile	1.5 – 8 km
UAV-122	Laser Guided Air-to-surface missile	55 km
UAV-230	Laser Guided Air-to-surface missile	150 km
Roketsan TANOK 120mm	Laser Guided Anti-Tank Missile	1–6 km
Roketsan KARAOK 125mm	Short-Rang fire-and-forget Anti-Tank Missile	2,500 m
Roketsan CİDA 90mm	Guided missile	50–750 m
Roketsan YATAĞAN 40 mm	Laser-guided miniature missile system	1,000 m
KARA ATMACA	Surface-to-Surface Cruise Missile	400 km
SOM A	Air-to-Surface Cruise Missile	250 km
SOM B1 and B2	Air-to-Surface Cruise Missile	250 km
SOM J	Air-to-Surface Cruise Missile	275 km
UMTAS 160 mm	Long range anti-tank missile system	500–8,000 m
L-UMTAS 160 mm	Laser-guided long range anti-tank missile system	500–8,000 m
OMTAS 160 mm	Medium range anti-tank missile system	200–4.000 m
Precision-guided munition
Name	Type	Range
Roketsan TEBER	Laser Guidance Kit	2–28 km
MAM-C high explosive variant	Laser-Guided UAV Bomb	8 km
MAM-L thermobaric variant	Laser-Guided UAV Bomb	8 km
MAM-T GPS/INS Guided variant	Laser-Guided UCAV Bomb	30 km launched from UCAVs 60 km launched from Ground attack aircraft 90 km launched from Multirole combat aircraft
Ballistic Protection Systems
Name	Type	Ammunition Type Protected
RZK-7	Composite Armor Blocks	Shrapnel - Mortar shell
RZK-10	Areal Protection System	Shrapnel - Mortar shell
RZB-20/20B	Areal Protection System	Light weapons, Shrapnel and High explosives
ROKETSAN Ballistic Protection Center (BPC)	Ballistic Protection System	Maximum protection against anti-tank missiles and RPG-type threats
Fuze Systems
Name	Type	Working system
107 mm	Rocket Fuze	Impact, Precision/Delayed
122 mm	Rocket Fuze	Impact, Precision/Delayed
122 mm Proximity Rocket/Missile Fuze	Rocket Fuze	Impact, Time (0-200 s) Proximity (1–15 m)
300 mm Proximity Rocket/Missile Fuze	Rocket Fuze	Impact, Time (0-200 s) Proximity (1–15 m)
20 mm M56 (M505 A3) Ammo Fuze	Ammunition Fuze	Impact
Space Projects
Name	Type	Details
Space Launch System (Turkey)	Satellite Launch System	The Micro-Satellite Launching System (MSLS)

== Facilities ==
- Munition Disposal Facility (MAAT)
- Air Bag Project “Booster Bag” used in airbag systems by ARC Automotive Company /U.S.A.produced by ROKETSAN.
- Ammunition Surveillance Facility (MIGYEM)
- Space Systems and Advanced Technologies Research Center
