= MKE 76 mm/62-caliber gun =

MKE 76 mm/62-caliber National Naval Gun
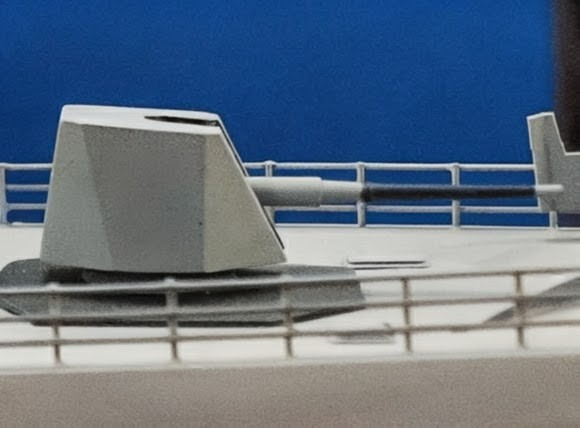
- MKE 76 mm/62-caliber gun scale model
- Type: Naval artillery
- Place of origin: Turkey

Service history
- In service: 2023-present
- Used by: Turkey

Production history
- Designer: Mechanical and Chemical Industry Corporation
- Manufacturer: Mechanical and Chemical Industry Corporation
- Unit cost: €4.7 million (2022)

Specifications
- Mass: 7,500 kg (16,500 lb) (empty)
- Crew: None on mount
- Caliber: 76 mm
- Barrels: Single barrel
- Action: Automatic
- Elevation: -15° to +85°
- Traverse: ± 360° (with slip ring)
- Rate of fire: 80 rounds per minute
- Effective firing range: 16 km (standard ammunition); 20 km (extended range ammunition)
- Feed system: 80 ready to fire rounds

The MKE 76 mm/62-caliber National Naval Gun is a naval gun designed and manufactured by Mechanical and Chemical Industry Corporation (MKE) of Turkey. It is a multi purpose naval gun.

== Development ==
According to the Government of Turkey, the gun was developed in 12 months. Test firings began in November 2021 and sea trials were completed in August 2022. The first production unit was delivered to the Turkish Navy in late-2023.

== Design ==
The gun has five firing modes with a maximum rate of 80 rounds per minute.

== Operators ==
- Turkey
  - Turkish Navy
- Romania
  - Romanian Naval Forces

== See also ==
- AK-176
- H/PJ-26 76 mm naval gun
- OTO Melara 76 mm
- Fajr-27
