= ASFAT =

Turkish state-owned defense contractor

ASFAT Inc.
- Type: Anonim Şirket
- Industry: Defence, shipbuilding
- Founded: January 12, 2018; 8 years ago
- Headquarters: Ankara, Ankara, Turkey
- Area served: Worldwide
- Key people: Alpaslan KAVAKLIOĞLU (Chairman)
- Products: Combat vehicles, warships, floating dry docks, aerospace products
- Services: Aircraft maintenance; hangar construction; contractor
- Owner: Turkish Ministry of National Defense
- Number of employees: >27,000 (2019)

ASFAT Inc., (Turkish: ASFAT, acronym: Askeri Fabrika ve Tersane İşletme, Military Factory and Shipyard Management) is a Turkish state-owned defense contractor. The company under the jurisdiction of the Turkish Ministry of National Defense, which develop, manage and utilise the facilities and capabilities of the 27 ordnance factories and three public naval shipyards in Turkey that were previously led by the country's Ministry of National Defense, to provide design, manufacture, maintenance, sustainment and training for global defence market.

== History ==
In 2019 ASFAT partnered with Vard Marine of Canada to produce naval and coast guard vessels for the international market. Also at International Defence Industry Fair 2019 ASFAT signed an MOU with Damen Group.
