= Roketsan ASW rocket launcher system =

Naval missile

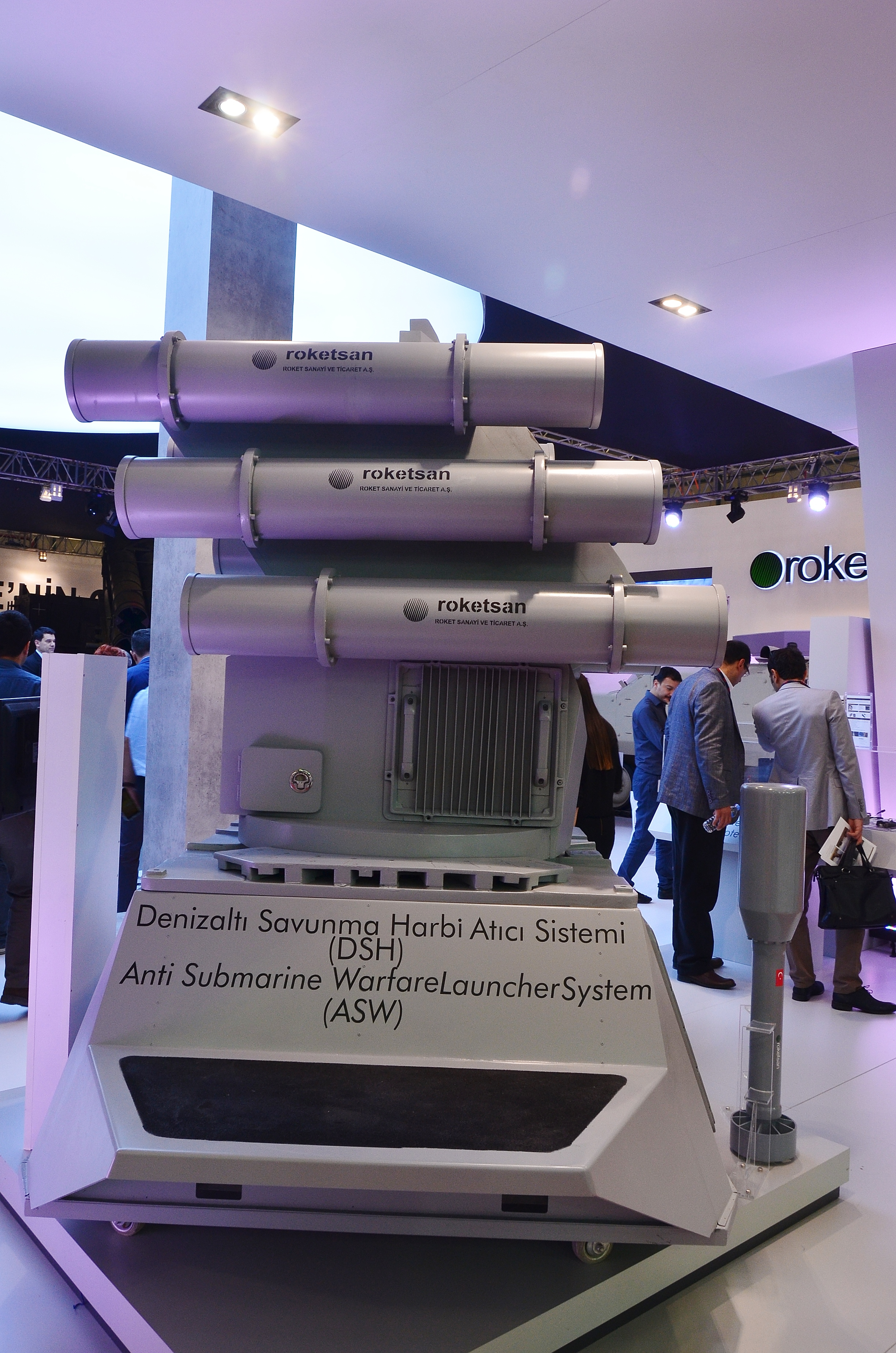
- Roketsan ASW rocket launcher system and rocket mockup
- Type: Anti-submarine rocket
- Place of origin: Turkey

Service history
- Used by: Turkey (future)

Production history
- Manufacturer: Roketsan

Specifications
- Mass: Rocket: 35.5 kg; Launcher: 1200 kg
- Length: 1.3 m (rocket)
- Diameter: 196 mm
- Caliber: 196 mm (7.7 in)
- Barrels: 6
- Effective firing range: Range: 2,000 m (6,600 ft); Depth of detonation: 15-300 m
- Warhead: High explosive
- Warhead weight: 12 kg
- Detonation mechanism: Acoustic proximity fuse
- Engine: Rocket
- Propellant: Reduced smoke composite propellant
- Guidance system: Automatic using weapon management system and sonar data (manual as back-up)
- Launch platform: Surface ships
- References: Roketsan

The Roketsan ASW rocket launcher system is an anti-submarine rocket system developed by Turkish company Roketsan. It is designed to provide surface vessels with a close-range defense capability against underwater threats, primarily submarines.

== Development ==
The Roketsan ASW rocket and launcher system was developed by the Turkish defense company Roketsan to provide a modern anti-submarine warfare capability for surface platforms. The system is going to integrated into various naval platforms, including the ULAQ unmanned surface vessel (USV) and the Ares Shipyard's 76-meter corvette design. The system was showcased at the 6th Azerbaijan International Defence Exhibition (ADEX) in 2016. It is a key part of Turkey's efforts to develop homegrown defense systems and missiles to ensure national security.

== Design ==
The Roketsan ASW rocket and launcher system is designed to automatically engage submarines using a platform's existing weapon management system and sonar. The system has a launch range of 500 to 2,000 meters and can be used against targets at depths of 15 to 300 meters. The rockets, which can be fired in single or salvo modes, are equipped with a high-explosive warhead and a rocket motor. The detonation depth of the rockets is controlled by a time fuse. The launcher system itself features stabilization and can perform both automatic and manual target engagement. A Fire Control System (FCS) calculates the necessary firing solution using navigation and target information from the surface platform.

== Operators ==
=== Operators ===
- Turkey
  - Turkish Navy

== See also ==
- Limbo
- Squid
- Hedgehog
- RBU-6000
- Weapon Alpha
- Terne
