= Steel Dome =

Turkish air defense system

Çelik Kubbe (Steel Dome)
- Place of origin: Turkey

Service history
- In service: 2025–present
- Used by: Turkish Armed Forces

Production history
- Designer: Aselsan; Roketsan; Tübitak SAGE; MKE; Havelsan
- Manufacturer: Aselsan; Roketsan; Tübitak SAGE; MKE; Havelsan
- Produced: 2024–present

Steel Dome (Turkish: Çelik Kubbe) is a multi-layered combined air defense system developed by Turkey using domestic technology. It has an integrated architecture, where air defense systems operate at different altitudes in an integrated manner. The system includes domestic systems such as Sungur, GÖKSUR, Korkut, Gürz SHORAD, Hisar-A, Hisar-O, Siper missile systems, Aselsan EIRS, ALP 100-G, ALP 300-G radars and REDET, PUHU, KORAL, VURAL (REDET-II) electronic warfare systems. Its integrated architecture creates a common air picture and increases defense effectiveness with artificial intelligence-based decision support systems.

== History ==
The Steel Dome Project was approved at the Defense Industry Executive Committee (SSİK) meeting held on 6 August 2024. The system aims to integrate sensor and weapon systems within a network-centric structure within a layered air defense architecture, create a common air picture, and transfer this data to artificial intelligence-supported decision-making systems.

It was developed by Aselsan in cooperation with Roketsan, Havelsan, Tübitak SAGE and MKE.

Steel Dome entered the inventory of the Turkish Armed Forces on 27 August 2025 in a ceremony which Aselsan delivered a 47 piece high, medium, and low-altitude air defense system and radar, totaling $460 million. It was announced that these deliveries were the first component of Turkey's air defense project. Erdoğan stated at the ceremony that one Siper battery consisting of 10 vehicles, three Hisar batteries consisting of 21 vehicles, seven PUHU and two REDET electronic warfare systems, ALP 300-G, ALP 100-G radars were delivered. On 26 November 2025, the Turkish Defence Agency signed a $6.5 billion contract with Aselsan, Havelsan, and Roketsan for the procurement of new air-defense systems for the “Steel Dome” project.

== System components ==
Steel Dome integrates domestic air defense systems that are effective at varying altitudes. The system includes radars, electro-optical sensors, command and control centers, and air defense elements with different ranges.

- Ejderha/AD 200, directed energy weapon.
- EJDERHA/AD 210 HPeM, high-power microwave UAV detection & neutralization, the refined version of EJDERHA/AD 200 HPeM weapon featuring a larger antenna, coaxial IR camera, and a mast-mounted AURA 100-G radar
- The ALKA directed-energy weapon (DEW) system is a Turkish dual electromagnetic/laser weapon developed by Roketsan.
- İHTAR C-UAS jammer with AESA radars, and Şahin 130/40GL, Micro/Mini unmanned aerial vehicle (UAV) interception system,
- Gökberk 10, mobile laser weapon system against UAVs,
- Gürz 150, superior target detection, identification, and tracking, Identification friend or foe (IFF) system, multiple engagement and sequential firing, gun turret providing 360° firing capability,
- Korkut SSA, mobile single-barrel and double-barrel 35 mm self-propelled anti-aircraft gun (SPAAG). Programmable munitions that detonate on approach to the target. Effective against UAVs and cruise missiles,
- PUSU, Low-cost, mobile weapon system developed by Roketsan, primarily mounted on 4x4 pickup trucks like the Toyota Hilux. Designed for high mobility and rapid deployment, serves as an anti-drone platform.
- Sungur, SHORAD system developed by Roketsan.
- BURÇ, Short-range air defense platform developed by Roketsan.
- ATILGAN, A self-propelled surface-to-air missile system which provides mobile, short-range air defense protection for ground units against aerial threats such as cruise missiles, unmanned aerial vehicles, low-flying fixed-wing aircraft and helicopters. Built by Roketsan and Aselsan.
- GÖKALP, autonomous kinetic drone interceptor
- TOLGA, A multi-layered Short-Range Air Defence and counter-drone network.
- GÖKSUR SAM-based CIWS
- Hisar A and Hisar O, short and medium-range air defence systems of the Hisar missile family with ranges of 15 and 25 km (9.3 and 15.5 mi) respectively,
- ILGAR 3-LT, disrupts enemy communications
- MİĞFER, FPV drone interception for critical site defense
- Siper, a high to medium air defense surface-to-air missile (SAM) system, of Siper-1 with 100 km (62 mi) and Siper-2 150 km (93 mi) range.
- Eralp, long range S-band early-warning radar system.
- ALP 300-G, long range AESA radar, S-band
- ALP 100-G, low altitude AESA radar
- ALP 400-G, long range searching AESA radar operating at lower frequencies than ALP 300-G, VHF and S-bands
- ALP 600-G, high Altitude Search and Tracking Radar capable of detecting threats from space.
- ALP 150-G/P, a passive radar
- ALP 500-G, larger fixed version of ALP 300-G
- ALP 310-G, long range surveillance radar

=== Drone Defense System (DRONDEF) ===
DRONDEF (Drone Defense System) is an integrated counter-unmanned aerial system (C-UAS) developed by ASELSAN as part of the Steel Dome air defense architecture. It employs a layered architecture combining sensors, electronic warfare systems, directed-energy weapons, kinetic effectors, autonomous interceptor drones, and high-power electromagnetic (HPEM) systems to counter mini and micro unmanned aerial vehicle (UAV) threats. According to ASELSAN, the system has a detection range of up to 10 km, with all subsystems integrated through a unified command and control (C2) center supported by artificial intelligence. The system comprises the following components:

- İHTAR counter-UAV system (detection and jamming)
- GÖKBERK 20 kW laser weapon systems
- KORKUT 25-25 mm programmable airburst weapon system
- GÖKALP autonomous interceptor drone
- EJDERHA AD high-power electromagnetic (HPEM) weapon system
- ŞAHİN LITE and ŞAHİN DUAL airburst weapon systems
- MİĞFER counter-FPV system
- Kangal anti-drone and Electronic warfare (EW) suite.
- GÖKER 35mm A multi-purpose, single-barrel weapon system.

DRONDEF is designed to protect critical infrastructure, military bases, convoys, and mobile units against low-altitude UAV threats. It can operate both as part of the broader Steel Dome network and as a standalone system.

== See also ==
- Golden Dome, American missile defense system
- Mission Sudarshan Chakra, Indian missile defense system
- T-Dome, Taiwanese missile defense system
- Missile defense systems by country
