= List of equipment of the Turkish Air Force =

This is a list of active weapons of the Turkish Air Force that are currently in service.

== Air Defence systems ==
Weapon	Image	Origin	Type	Versions	In service	Notes
Surface-to-air missile systems
S-400 Triumph		Russia	Long-range SAM/ABM system	S-400 M	2 batteries	36 fire units and 190+ missiles
Nike Hercules		United States	Long-range SAM/ABM system	EFS/ATBM HIPAR	2 batteries	Underwent upgrades in 'Nike Hercules Allied Supportability Program'. In reserve use (2025). To be replaced by SIPER.
SİPER		Turkey	Long-range SAM/ABM system	Block I	5 batteries	Deliveries will continue towards 2030s. Part of Steel Dome multi-layer air defence system.
SİPER		Turkey	Long-range SAM/ABM system	Block II	1 test battery	Deliveries will continue towards 2030s. Part of Steel Dome multi-layer air defence system.
SİPER		Turkey	Long-range SAM/ABM system	Block III	1 test battery	
MIM-23 Hawk		USA	Medium range SAM	Hawk XXI K/J	16 batteries.	92 fire units. Modernized. In reserve use (2025). To be replaced by Hisar-O.
Rapier missile		UK	Medium range SAM	Rapier 2000	86 batteries.	515 fire units. Produced under license by ROKETSAN.
HİSAR		Turkey	Medium range SAM	HİSAR-O	10 batteries	Deliveries will continue towards 2030s. Part of Steel Dome.
HİSAR		Turkey	Short range SAM	HİSAR-A	10 batteries	Deliveries will continue towards 2030s. Part of Steel Dome.
ZIPKIN PMADS		Turkey	Short range SAM		32 vehicles	
Anti-aircraft guns
Bofors 40 mm Automatic Gun L/70		Sweden; Turkey	Anti-aircraft autocannon	L/70	x	Locally produced. Modernized with Aselsan made Fire and Command Control System. Part of Steel Dome.
Oerlikon GDF		Switzerland; Turkey	Anti-aircraft autocannon	GDF-003B	x	Locally produced. Modernized with Aselsan made Fire and Command Control System. Part of Steel Dome.

=== Radars and Electronic warfare ===
Some are in shared use within NATO Integrated Air Defense System framework.

Electronic warfare
Name	Origin	Type	Details
KORAL	Turkey	Long Range Mobile Electronic Warfare System	
VURAL	Turkey	Mobile Electronic Warfare System	
Kangal	Turkey	Jamming/Blunt (Jammer) System	Anti-drone jammer system.
EW used by aircraft
AN/ALQ-257	United States	Electronic warfare suite	168 EW systems(IVEWS) on order for F16s from Northrop Grumman.
AN/ALQ-211	United States	Electronic warfare suite	EW suite pod systems(AIDEWS) and (SPEWS) used by F-16s.
AN/ALQ-178	United States	Electronic warfare suite	EW suite pod systems(AIDEWS) and (SPEWS) used by F-16s.
GERGEDAN 4-U	Turkey	Electronic warfare system	In service.
Radar
Aselsan EIRS	Turkey	Early Warning Radar	Antenna architecture in AESA and digital beamforming infrastructure with target detection range of 470+ km and to be used in various situations up to 600+ km distance. Initial delivery in 2023 with further deliveries in 2026-27.
ALP 300-G	Turkey	Long-range Search radar/Early Warning Radar	N/A
ALP 310G (UMAR)	Turkey	Long-range Search radar	ALP-310G is derived from the ALP-300G (EIRS) radar. It will be used by SİPER SAM system.
ALP 100-G	Turkey	Low Altitude Radar	In service.
KALKAN I/II	Turkey	Medium and Long-range Search Radar	Will also be used with HİSAR air defence systems.
HTRS	Turkey	Air Traffic Radar	The first delivery of the Air Traffic Radar System (HTRS) developed in cooperation with ASELSAN and TÜBİTAK was made to the Air Force Command.
MAR	Turkey	Low-range Unit Guidance/Search Radar	ASELSAN MAR in use with AA cannons.
AIR	Turkey	Low altitude radar	AIR to be developed by ASELSAN based on the needs of the Air Force Command; It will be effective against warplanes, helicopters, UAVs, stealth aircraft and anti-radiation missiles.
Akrep-1000G (ÇFKAR)	Multifunctional fire control radar	Akrep-1000G is designed within the scope of the SİPER SAM System.	
AN/MPQ-44	USA	Surveillance radar	Issued with Nike Hercules missiles.
AN/MPS-14	USA	Height Finder Radar	Issued with Nike Hercules missiles.
AN/MPQ-14	USA	Command Guidance Radar	Issued with Nike Hercules missiles.
AN/FPS-71	USA	High-Power Acquisition Radar	Issued with Nike Hercules missiles.
AN/MPQ-64 Sentinel	USA/Turkey	Short Range Search Radar	Issued with HAWK missiles.
AN/MPQ-62	USA/Turkey	Continuous Wave Acquisition Radar	Issued with HAWK missiles.
AN/MPQ-61	USA/Turkey	HAWK High Power Illuminator radar	Issued with HAWK missiles.
Dagger radar	UK/TUR	Multi-beam high resolution 3D radar system.	Issued with Rapier missiles.
Blindfire radar	UK/TUR	Unit Guidance Radar	Issued with Rapier missiles.
Selex RAT-31DL	ITA	Long-range air surveillance radar	Upgraded in 2014.
Selex RAT-31SL	ITA	Short-range air surveillance radar	Upgraded in 2014.
AN/FPS-117	USA	Long-range air surveillance radar	
AN/TPS-77	USA	Long-range air surveillance radar	
AN/TPS-64	USA	Long-range air surveillance radar	
HR-3000 RSRP	UK	Long-range air surveillance radar	
TRS 22XX Parasol	FRA	Long-range air surveillance radar	Produced by HAVELSAN
TRS 3445 Suricate	FRA	Short-range air surveillance radar	Produced by HAVELSAN
Skyguard	Switzerland	Pulse doppler search & tracking radar	

=== Pods ===
Name	Origin	Type	Details
ASELPOD	Turkey	Targeting pod	New pods developed by Aselsan and TÜBİTAK for the Turkish F16s. New ASELPOD-2 is under development.
ASELPOD-2	Turkey	Targeting pod	New pods developed by Aselsan and TÜBİTAK for the Turkish F16s. New ASELPOD-2 is under development.
EHPOD	Turkey	Electronic warfare pod	New pods developed by Aselsan and TÜBİTAK for the Turkish F16s. New ASELPOD-2 is under development.
EDPOD	Turkey	Electronic defence pod	New electronic defence pod used by the Air Force.
ANTIDOT 3-U	Turkey	Electronic warfare pod	New electronic warfare pod used by UAVs in service.
LANTIRN	United States	Targeting/Navigation pod	AN/AAQ-13 – Targeting; AN/AAQ-14 – Navigation Total of 110 pods.
AN/ALQ(V)9	United States	Electronic warfare pods	Used by F-16s. Being replaced by EHPOD.
EL/L-8225	United States	Electronic warfare pods	Used by F-16s. Being replaced by EHPOD.
AN/AAQ-33 Sniper	United States	Targeting pod	30 pods in service. 16 On order for F16V.
Legion	United States	IRST pod	Multi-function Sensor system. On order.

== Missiles and bombs ==
Weapon	Image	Origin	Type	Details
Air-to-air missiles
Gökdoğan		TUR	Beyond-visual-range missile	In service.
AIM-120 AMRAAM		USA	Beyond-visual-range missile	AIM-120A; AIM-120B – 138; AIM-120C-7 – 107; AIM-120-C8 - 53
AIM-7 Sparrow		USA	Medium-range	AIM-7E; AIM-7F
AIM-9 Sidewinder		USA	Short-range	AIM-9P3 – 750+ AIM-9S – 810; AIM-9M – 200; AIM-9L – N/A; AIM-9X Block I – 232; AIM-9X Block II – 117; AIM-9X Block III - 60
Bozdoğan		TUR	Short-range	In service.
Future Acquisition
Gökhan		TUR	Anti-ballistic missile	Under development.
Akdoğan		TUR	Mini missile	Under development.
Meteor		EU	Beyond-visual-range missile	Ordered with Eurofighter package.
ASRAAM		UK	Short-range	Ordered with Eurofighter package.
Brimstone		UK	Short-range	Ordered with Eurofighter package.
Air-to-ground missiles
SOM		Turkey	Cruise missile	SOM-A; SOM-B1; SOM-B2; SOM-J
Popeye (missile)		Israel	Cruise missile	Popeye I – 46; Popeye II
AGM-84H/K SLAM-ER		USA	Cruise missile	SLAM-ER – 48
Standoff Land Attack Missile		USA	Cruise missile	AGM-84H/K
AGM-88 HARM		USA	Anti-radiation missile	AGM-88B – 155 – 96 more on order. AGM-88E(AARGM) – 96 on order.
AGM-65 Maverick		USA	Guided missile	AGM-65G/G2 – 470; AGM-65A/B
Future Acquisition
Atmaca	-	Turkey	Anti-ship missile	Being developed suitable configuration compatible with F-16s.
Gezgin	-	Turkey	Cruise missile	Under development.
Çakır	-	Turkey	Cruise missile	In active development. On going tests.
İHA-230	-	Turkey	Supersonic missile	On-going tests. Under development.
AKBABA	-	Turkey	Anti-radiation missile	In active development, replacement for AGM-88 HARM
SUPER ŞİMŞEK	-	Turkey	Unmanned system/missile	In mass production.
Bombs
JDAM		USA	Guidance kit	In use with GBU-31, GBU-32, GBU-38, GBU-54 1000 : 400 GBU-31(V)1, 200 GBU-31(V)3, 300 GBU-38, and 100 GBU-54 laser JDAM kits on order.
HGK		TUR	Guidance kit	In use with MK-82 and MK-84; HGK-82, HGK-83, HGK-84 HGK-83 acquisition New batch HGK-84A delivery was made.
KGK		TUR	Guidance kit	In use with MK-82 and MK-83; KGK-82, KGK-83 KGK-82/KGK83 acquisition.
LGK	-	TUR	Guidance kit	In use with MK-82 and MK-84;LGK-82, LGK-84. LGK-82/LGK-83 Phase II acquisition.
TEBER		TUR	Guidance kit	In use with MK-81 and MK-82;TEBER-81, TEBER-82. Upgraded with wings in the fuselage and can optionally be integrated with a proximity sensor. It can be used by UAVs.
Gözde	-	TUR	Guidance kit	In addition to the laser seeker head option, GÖZDE has a different set of fins than previous guidance kits. Thanks to the structure that allows for higher maneuverability and new flight algorithms that support laser guidance, GÖZDE allows hitting fixed and high-speed moving (50–120 km/h) targets.
LAÇİN	-	TUR	Guidance kit	In use with MK-82. Advanced version of TEBER laser guidance kit. It can work on man-in-the-loop principle.
HAYALET/NEB		TUR	Bunker buster	NEB-1; NEB-2; NEB-T
SARB-83	-	TUR	Bunker buster	
SERT-82	-	TUR	Bunker buster	
BLU-109 bomb		USA	Bunker buster	BLU-109 – 100
AGM-154 JSOW		USA	Glide bomb	AGM-154A-1/C – 104
CBU-58	-	USA	Cluster bomb	
CBU-100		USA	Cluster bomb	
CBU-105 WCMD		USA	Cluster bomb	CBU 105/SFW WCMD – 50
Mark 81 bomb		USA	General-purpose bomb	
Mark 82 bomb		USA	General-purpose bomb	12 more on order.
Mark 83 bomb		USA	General-purpose bomb	
Mark 84 bomb		USA	General-purpose bomb	
GBU-8		USA	Guided bomb	8/B HOBOS – 200
GBU-12 Paveway II		USA	Guided bomb	Paveaway I/II – 1200+
GBU-10 Paveway II		USA	Guided bomb	Paveaway I/II – 1200+
GBU-39		USA	Guided bomb	864 GBU-39/B On order
TOGAN	-	TUR	Guided bomb	Air-to-surface launched 81 mm mortar munition
BOZOK	-	TUR	Guided bomb	
MAM		TUR	Guided bomb	MAM-C(high explosive variant) & MAM-L(thermobaric variant) and MAM-T
TOLUN	-	TUR	Guided bomb	Can be carried by warplanes up to four in a single weapon station, has version with an Imaging Infrared (IIR) Seeker Head. In service.
Matra Durandal		France	Anti-runway bomb	BLU-107 Durandal II – 523
Future Acquisition
KUZGUN	-	TUR	Modular joint ammunition	KUZGUN-KY(Solid Fuel version) completed his first test fire. KUZGUN-SS(Free floating version) also being tested. KUZGUN-TJ(Turbojet version) is under development.
Gökçe	-	TUR	Guidance kit	Within the scope of the GÖKÇE Project, ANS/KKS/Laser guided, which can be used with the 1000-lb Mk-83 general purpose bombs in the HvKK inventory and the SARB-83T sequential piercing warhead developed and produced by TÜBİTAK SAGE, has the ability to effectively hit moving and fixed targets. and a cost-effective guidance kit will be developed.
KAYI	-	TUR	Mini guided bomb	Guided Miniature Munitions Family Kayı, which can be used in various manned/unmanned aerial platforms with its features and product range. Under development.
UÇA	-	TUR	Air launched naval mine	The mine has the form of an Mk-84 and carries plastic explosives instead of a particle effect warhead, is moving to the designated destination via the Winged Guidance Kit under GPS/INS guidance. After landing, the mine waits in the water and explodes under the water when a ship or submarine approaches with Acoustic + Pressure + Magnetic sensors.
GAZAP	-	TUR	Thermobaric bomb	2000lb vacuum-bomb based on Mk-84 with a kill radius of 1km. MK84-T.
TENDÜREK	-	TUR	Thermobaric bomb	500lb vacuum-bomb based on Mk-82 with a kill radius of 0.25km. MK82-T.

== Vehicles ==
Name	Image	Origin	Type	Quantity
Infantry mobility vehicles
BMC Kirpi		Turkey	MRAP	15
Otokar Cobra II		Turkey	APC	82
Nurol Ejder Yalçın		Turkey	MRAP	N/A
Otokar Engerek		Turkey	LUV	N/A
Unimog		Germany; Turkey	Truck	N/A
Unmanned ground vehicle
TMR-II Kutlu	-	Turkey	Light class unmanned ground vehicle	N/A

== Small arms and Light weapons ==
Weapon	Origin	Type
TP 9	Turkey	Handgun
SAR 9	Turkey	Handgun
Beretta 92FS	Italy	Handgun
MP5	West Germany Turkey	Submachine Gun
MKE MPT	Turkey	Assault rifle
HK 33E	West Germany Turkey	Assault rifle
HK G3	West Germany Turkey	Assault rifle
M4	United States Turkey	Assault rifle
HK 416A5	Germany	Assault rifle
MG3	West Germany Turkey	Machine gun
M2	United States	Machine gun
HK MG4	Germany	Machine gun
KNT-76	Turkey	Sniper rifle
JNG-90	Turkey	Sniper rifle
Barrett M82	United States	Anti-Material Sniper Rifle
AK-40GL	Turkey	Grenade Launcher
MKEK 40mm	Turkey	Grenade Launcher
MKEK T40	Turkey	Grenade Launcher
HK GLM	Germany	Grenade Launcher
M203	United States	Grenade Launcher

== Satellites ==
- Satellites of Turkey

== Retired systems ==
- 90 mm gun M1/M2/M3
- Bofors 40 mm L/60 gun
- FIM-43 Redeye
- M45 Quadmount
- M51 Skysweeper
- M1919 Browning
- Maxim gun
- MG 08
- Nike Ajax
- Nike Hercules
- Oerlikon 20 mm cannon
- Vickers machine gun
