= GÖKSUR =

- Type: SAM-based CIWS
- Place of origin: Turkey

Service history
- Used by: § Operators

Production history
- Designer: Aselsan and TÜBİTAK SAGE
- Manufacturer: Aselsan and TÜBİTAK SAGE
- Variants: § Variants

Specifications
- Mass: 142 kilograms (313 lb 1 oz) (missile)
- Length: 3,300 mm (10 ft 10 in) (missile)
- Diameter: 6.3 in (160 mm)
- Warhead: Blast fragmentation warhead
- Propellant: Solid-fuel rocket with thrust vectoring control
- Operational range: 15 km (9.3 mi)
- Guidance system: Imaging infrared seeker with bidirectional encrypted datalink and artificial intelligence (AI)
- Launch platform: Guided Missile Launcher or Vertical Launching System (VLS)

The GÖKSUR is a surface-to-air missile-based CIWS developed by the Turkish defense companies Aselsan and TÜBİTAK SAGE. It is designed to provide close-in defense for naval platforms against a wide range of aerial threats, including anti-ship missiles, cruise missiles, unmanned aerial vehicles (UAVs), fighter jets, and helicopters. The system is a critical part of Steel Dome, Turkey's multi-layered air defense system. It is one of the two Turkish missile based CIWS along with the Levent.

== Development ==
The GÖKSUR system has been developed to meet the needs of the Turkish Navy. It incorporates the GÖKSUR IIR missile, which is an infrared imaging (IIR) guided missile. This missile is derived from the Bozdoğan air-to-air missile, adapted for naval defense with features such as folding rear fins and a two-way data link for mid-course updates. The first successful live-fire test of the GÖKSUR Vertical Launch System (VLS) was conducted on February 16, 2025, from the TCG Beykoz corvette.

== Design ==
The GÖKSUR system is characterized by its modular design, allowing for easy adaptation and integration with various naval platforms, including frigates and corvettes. It can operate independently or be integrated with a platform's combat management system. The GÖKSUR system incorporates a 360-degree threat destruction capability. The GÖKSUR missile features an Imaging Infrared (IIR) seeker. This seeker, combined with intermediate stage guidance facilitated by a data link, allows for interception of threats like sea-skimming anti-ship missiles. The missile uses folding flap and impact warhead. Its design supports both angled and vertical launch capabilities. The system also uses artificial intelligence (AI)-with its fire control system.

== Variants ==
GÖKSUR is available in several configurations to suit different platform requirements:

- GÖKSUR 100-N VLS: A vertical launch system (VLS) configuration, offering 360-degree engagement capability without the delay of turret direction. This configuration can have adjustable capacity depending on the platform. At IDEF 2025, a 20-missile configuration (two 10-cell clusters per side) was displayed, suitable for larger frigates.
- GÖKSUR 100-N/StA: A stand-alone turret variant that includes its own sensors (e.g., AKREP 200-N AESA radars and electro-optics) and can operate independently. This variant typically holds 12 missiles.
- GÖKSUR 100-N: A configuration displayed at Euronaval 2024, which foregoes onboard sensors for a higher missile capacity (e.g., 20 missiles). This version is intended for integration with the ship's existing combat management system and sensors.

== Operators ==
=== Future operators ===
- Turkey
  - Turkish Navy

== See also ==
- HHQ-10 / FL-3000N
- RIM-116 Rolling Airframe Missile
- Sea Oryx
