= SİPER =

Turkish long-range surface-to-air missile defense system

SİPER Air Defence System
- Type: Surface-to-air/anti-ballistic missile
- Place of origin: Turkey

Service history
- In service: Block 1: 2020–present Block 2: prototype
- Used by: Turkish Air Force

Production history
- Designer: Aselsan; Roketsan; Tübitak SAGE
- Designed: 2018–present
- Manufacturer: Roketsan
- Produced: 2019–present

Specifications
- Length: Block 1: 5.4 m; Block 2: 6.3 m
- Diameter: Block 1: 370 mm (15 in); Block 2: 420 mm (17 in)
- Warhead: High Explosive
- Detonation mechanism: Calculated delay proximity fuze
- Engine: Solid propellant, two-stage motor
- Operational range: Block 1: >100+ km (official); Block 2: >150 km (official); Block 3: >180+ km
- Flight ceiling: Block 1: 20 km; Block 2: 30 km; Block 3: +30 km class
- Guidance system: Active RF seeker

SİPER (Trench) is a high to medium air defense surface-to-air missile (SAM) system. Designed to defend against any type of airborne threat, it can engage aircraft, cruise missiles, air-to-ground missiles and unmanned aerial vehicles (UAVs). It was jointly developed in Turkey by the companies Roketsan, Aselsan and the research institute TÜBİTAK SAGE.

The SİPER system project was launched by the Presidency of Defence Industries in 2018. The missile is developed by Roketsan, and most sensors and electronics by Aselsan. The SIPER missile was originally announced as Hisar-U. However, it was later announced that the Siper missile would be a new missile family and 3 different blocks would be developed. Siper Block 1 were developed based on the Hisar-O missile with booster.

== Siper Block 1 ==
Siper Block 1 was originally planned as Hisar-U. However, after it was concluded that Hisar-U could not meet Turkey's long-range and high-altitude air defense missile needs with its current structure, it was decided to transform Hisar-U into a new missile family. This missile family was named Siper and the name of Hisar-U was changed to Siper Block 1. Siper Block 1 was designed by adding a booster to the Hisar-O missile and some parts were modified. During the first firing test, which took place at the test range in Sinop, northern Turkey in December 2022, the SİPER Block 1 missile successfully demonstrated the ability to detect, track and hit a high-speed target aircraft at a range exceeding 100 km (62 mi). It was announced that SİPER will be put into service within 2024.

At the Defense Industry meeting held on 20 December 2022, it was decided that Turkey would start mass production of air defense products. SİPER successfully passed its final test on 13 May 2023, hitting a long-distance target. On 15 December 2023, a contract worth more than $1.5 billion was signed between Aselsan, Roketsan and Tübitak SAGE companies and the Turkish Land Forces and the Turkish Air Force for the mass production of Siper, Hisar and other air defense missiles. According to the contract, the mass production products of the Siper Block-1 and other air defense missile systems will be delivered to the Turkish Armed Forces between 2025 and 2029. Speaking at the contract ceremony, Turkish Defense Minister Yaşar Güler said that Siper and other defense products were produced domestically. Aselsan CEO Ahmet Akyol said that the production of Siper air defense systems continued in 2024. He also stated that the chips of the missiles, radars and other electronic parts were designed by them and thousands of these chips were produced. In October 2024 Siper Block-1 entered the inventory. It was announced that Siper Block-1 had undergone more than 100 launching tests. On 27 August 2025 a Siper system consisting of 10 vehicles was delivered to the Turkish Armed Forces at a ceremony attended by Erdoğan. It was later announced that a standard battery of a Siper Block 1 system consists of 14 vehicles. It was stated that the Siper Block 1 radar can detect enemy elements at a range of 500–600 km and that mass production is underway as of September 2025.

== Siper Block 2 ==
Siper Block 2 missile was developed as a completely new missile, unlike block 1. It has a single-stage rocket engine. It was also announced that a booster was planned to be used to extend the range of Block-2. The first firing test of Siper B2, which has a range of 150 km, was successfully completed in August 2023. On 15 September 2024, a new test was conducted in Sinop. The development of the system continues at the air defense test center named Robosim established by Aselsan. A mock-up of the missile was first seen in public at the Euronaval fair in November 2024.In June 2026, TÜBİTAK SAGE and Roketsan announced that the Siper-2 missile successfully engaged a manoeuvring Banshee target UAV during a live-fire test at the Sinop Test Range. The missile, guided by Aselsan’s ALP 310-G search radar and PUSAT 1000-G fire control radar, hit the evasive target.

== Siper Block 3 ==
It was announced that Siper Block 3 is under development. The system is developed against ballistic missiles. Siper Block 3 will have a range of 180 km+.

== Siper Block 4 ==
In May 2026, Turkish Defence Industries Secretary Haluk Görgün announced the development of Siper Block 4 as the upper-layer ballistic missile defence component of Turkey's Steel Dome architecture.

The missile is reportedly designed for interception at significantly higher altitudes than previous SİPER variants, potentially including exo-atmospheric interception profiles against medium-range and longer-range ballistic missile threats.

According to defence industry reporting, Siper Block 4 is expected to use a multi-stage propulsion architecture comparable in concept to systems such as THAAD and the RIM-161 Standard Missile 3.

The missile is anticipated to incorporate a kinetic hit-to-kill vehicle equipped with thruster-based maneuver control and an infrared seeker optimized for interception at extreme altitudes and velocities.

The development of Siper Block 4 is associated with Turkey's broader ballistic missile defence efforts, including long-range early warning radar systems such as ASELSAN's ALP 500-G and ALP 600-G projects, as well as prospective space-based missile tracking capabilities.

== SİPER-A ==
In May 2026, Turkish Defence Industries Secretary Haluk Görgün announced the development of the SİPER-A missile as part of Turkey's layered ballistic missile defence architecture under the Steel Dome project.

The missile is intended to serve as the lower-layer anti-ballistic interceptor of the SİPER family, optimized for atmospheric terminal interception of ballistic missiles at high altitudes.

According to official statements, SİPER-A will feature an active electronically scanned array (AESA) RF seeker and a high-agility quick reaction capability for engaging ballistic missile threats during their terminal phase. The system is reportedly intended to counter short-range ballistic missiles (SRBMs) and, within a limited engagement envelope, some medium-range ballistic missiles (MRBMs).

The interceptor is expected to employ hit-to-kill engagement principles similar in operational role to the MIM-104 Patriot PAC-3 family, using maneuvering thrusters for enhanced agility during high-altitude interception profiles.

== Specifications ==
Each Siper Air Defense System Battery will have four Siper Missile Launch Systems (FFS), at least two Missile Transport Loading Systems (FTYS), one UMAR/TEIRS Search Radar (AR), one Fire Control Center (AKM), one Fire Control Radar (AKR), one Fleet Control Center (FKM) and three Communication Station Vehicles (PINs).

Details:

- Air defence planning and coordination
- Management and distribution of information within the scope of command and control
- Combined aerial image production
- Multiple engagement and sequential firing
- Manual/semi-automatic/automatic engagement
- Friend-Foe Recognition (IFF)
- Threat assessment and weapons allocation
- Automated diagnostics management
- Multi-target multi-radar fusion, Bidirectional communication with missiles
- Wired/wireless communication
- Upright/oblique shot
- Ability to work in harsh conditions
- Interface with HvBS, Radnet connection
- Link to higher command via tactical data links (Link-16, JREAP-C)
- Embedded simulation
- Ability to operate with 8 FFS, each of which can fire 6 missiles

== Operators ==
=== Current Operators ===
Turkey

Turkish Air Force:

- Block One - 5 (or more) batteries

=== Future Operators ===
Indonesia

Indonesian Air Force: Unknown number of SiPER missiles on order. Would be locally developed based on Indonesian requirements as the Trisula-U air defense system.

== See also ==
- Hisar
- Kusha
- Patriot
- SAMP/T
- HQ-9
- HQ-22
- Khordad 15 (air defense system)
- Barak 8
- Bavar-373
- L-SAM
- Aselsan EIRS - Radar of the Siper Block 1
