= UBAS =

UBAS or Ubas may refer to:

- Aircraft Independent Firing System (shortened as UBAS in Turkish), a weapon employment system developed for the Turkish Air Force F-16 aircraft.
- University of Birmingham Air Squadron, a squadron within the Royal Air Force.
- Ubas, a ring name of Ecuadorian professional wrestler Pablo Márquez (wrestler)
