= Kiliç UUV =

Turkish unmanned underwater vehicle

Kiliç UUV (also Kiliç AUV; Turkish: Kılıç Otonom Su Altı Aracı, Kılıç OSA) is a Turkish autonomous kamikaze unmanned underwater vehicle family manufactured by Aselsan. It is the second Turkish kamikaze vehicle family by Aselsan, after the Aselsan Albatros-S unmanned surface vessel.

The smaller model, Kiliç 10 and the larger model, Kiliç 200, were first presented at the Saha Expo in 2026.

Kiliç 10 was also showcased, together with Deringöz reconnaissance UUV, at the August 2026 Teknofest Mavi Vatan event.

== Kiliç 10 ==
Kiliç 10 is a compact (120 cm length, 28 cm diameter), one-man portable system with integrated warhead designed for autonomous, fiber-optic cable controlled, and swarm operation modes with satellite, RF and acoustic communications and thermal and IR cameras. It is intended to detect and destroy maritime targets, both underwater and surface ones. Its mission range is 10 nautical miles.

== Kiliç 200 ==
The mission range of Kiliç 200 is 100 nautical miles, up to 200 NM with extra battery, with the same functionality as Kiliç 10, with AI-support for visual localization and target detection.
