= FNSS ACV-30 =

ACV-30
- Type: Armored combat vehicle
- Place of origin: Turkey

Service history
- In service: 2017

Production history
- Manufacturer: FNSS Defence Systems
- Produced: 2018
- No. built: 13

Specifications
- Length: 7.07 m (23.2 ft)
- Width: 3.90 m (12.8 ft)
- Height: 2.20 m (7.2 ft)
- Crew: 4
- Armor: STANAG 4569 Level 4
- Main armament: Radar or Weapon System
- Engine: 400 hp
- Suspension: torsion bar 350 mm
- Operational range: 500 km (310 mi)
- Maximum speed: 65 km/h (40 mph)

ACV-30 is the designation of an armored combat vehicle developed by the Turkish defense company FNSS Savunma Sistemleri A.Ş.

The vehicle has been selected as an Air Defence System platform by the Turkish Armed Forces within the scope of the Korkut SPAAG and HISAR surface to air missile system projects.

== Characteristics ==
Configuration of the vehicle can be changed to suit the operational requirements of the user. It has the capacity to carry payloads such as 150 mm guns, air-defence platforms, largescale mobile radar systems, artillery fire support, and pedestal mounted artillery and missile systems.

== Korkut SPAAG ==
Designed to replace the aging M42A1 Duster systems of the Turkish Armed Forces, each Korkut system compromises of a command and control vehicle and three weapons platforms. Each weapon platform carries a twin 2×35 mm Oerlikon KDC-02 cannon, manufactured under licence by MKEK. Each weapons system can fire up to 1100 rounds a minute up to a range of 4 km. The command and control vehicle has an effective radar range of 70 km.

The Weapon System Vehicle and Command-and-Control Vehicle configurations designed under the Korkut Project are fully amphibious and have the capability of propelling themselves in deep water and rivers.

The Turkish Armed Forces has ordered 40 weapons systems, deliveries are scheduled to complete in 2022. Additionally it was reported that Pakistan plans to induct this weapon system and that Pakistan would conduct tests in mid 2017.

== HISAR ==
The HISAR (surface to air missile system) is a family of surface to air missile systems being developed by ASELSAN and ROKETSAN since 2007. It consists of the HİSAR-A low attitude air defense system and HİSAR-O medium range air defence system.

== Operational history ==
- Second Libyan Civil War – ACV-30 Korkut was deployed to Mitiga airport by Turkey under request of UN-recognized Government of National Accords.

== Operators ==
- Turkey
- Pakistan: Mounts the Aselsan Korkut, inducted in 2026.
