= List of equipment of the Somali Armed Forces =

The following is a list of active equipment of the Somali Armed Forces. Retired equipment is listed at the bottom.

== Small arms ==
Name	Image	Caliber	Type	Origin	Notes
Rifles
AKM		7.62×39mm	Assault rifle	Soviet Union	
AK-74		5.45×39mm	Assault rifle	Soviet Union	Used by National Intelligence and Security Agency special forces Gaashaan and Waran, and Danab commandos.
AK-74M		5.45×39mm	Assault rifle	Russia	Used by NISA special forces Gaashaan and Waran, and Danab commandos.
Vz. 58		7.62×39mm	Assault rifle	Czechoslovak Socialist Republic	
PM md. 63		7.62×39mm	Assault rifle	Socialist Republic of Romania	
AK-63		7.62×39mm	Assault rifle	Hungarian People's Republic	
Zastava M70		7.62×39mm	Assault rifle	Yugoslavia	
Type 56		7.62×39mm	Assault rifle	China	
MG3	BundeswehrMG3_noBG	7.62×51mm	General purpose machine gun	Turkey	
MPT-76		7.62×51mm	Battle rifle	Turkey	450 delivered.
M16		5.56×45mm	Assault rifle	United States	
M4A1		5.56×45mm	Carbine Assault rifle	United States	Used by Special Forces.
Heckler & Koch G3		7.62×51mm	Battle rifle	West Germany	Used by the Danab Brigade and the "Gorgor" Brigade, also used by Camp TURKSOM NCOs and officer cadets.
SKS-45 Simonov		7.62×39mm	Semi-automatic rifle	USSR	Used for ceremonial purposes by the Presidential Guard.
Sniper rifles
SVD		7.62×54mmR	Designated marksman rifle Sniper rifle	Soviet Union	
Machine guns
RP-46		7.62×54mmR	Light machine gun	Soviet Union	
SG-43		7.62×54mmR	Medium machine gun	Soviet Union	
Browning M1919		7.62×51mm	Medium machine gun	United States	
KPV		14.5×114mm	Heavy machine gun	Soviet Union	
DShK		12.7×108mm	Heavy machine gun	Soviet Union	
RPD		7.62×39mm	Squad automatic weapon	Soviet Union	
PKM		7.62×54mmR	General-purpose machine gun	Soviet Union	
Zastava M84		7.62×54mmR	General-purpose machine gun	Yugoslavia	
Rocket propelled grenade launchers
RPG-2		40mm	Rocket-propelled grenade	Soviet Union	
RPG-7		40mm	Rocket-propelled grenade	Soviet Union	
Grenade launchers
AGS-17		30×29mm	Grenade launcher	Soviet Union	

Among pistols formerly reported in service in 2009 were the Soviet Makarov pistol.

== Tanks ==
Model	Image	Origin	Quantity	Details
M48		United States	Unknown	Delivered by Turkey in February 2026.
M60		United States	Unknown	Delivered by Turkey in February 2026.
M-84AC3		Yugoslavia	17	Soon to be delivered by Serbia.

== Armoured fighting vehicles ==
Model	Image	Origin	Quantity	Details
APC (W)
ACV-15		Turkey	n/a	
AT-105 Saxon		United Kingdom	25+	
Bastion		France	13	
Fiat 6614		Italy	n/a	
PPV
Kirpi		Turkey	20	
Puma M36		South Africa	6	
RG-31 Nyala		South Africa	n/a	
Casspir		South Africa	n/a	
Mamba Mk5		South Africa	9+	
MAV-5		Italy	n/a	
AUV
Tiger 4×4		China	12	

== Mine-resistant ambush protected vehicles ==
Name	Image	Type	Origin	Quantity	Status	Notes
BMC Kirpi II		Mine-resistant ambush protected vehicle	Turkey	N/A	In Service	
Streit Tornado		Mine-resistant ambush protected vehicle/Armoured personnel carrier	United Arab Emirates	N/A	In Service	Seen in military convoy.

== Armoured personnel carriers ==
Name	Image	Type	Origin	Quantity	Status	Notes
Streit Spartan		Armoured personnel carrier	United Arab Emirates	N/A	In Service	Seen in military convoy.

== Utility vehicles ==
Name	Image	Type	Origin	Quantity	Status	Notes
Toyota Land Cruiser		Utility vehicle	Japan	10	In Service	Donated by Turkey.
Mitsubishi Triton		Utility vehicle	Japan	26+	In Service	Donated by Turkey.
Trucks
M939		Utility truck	United States	Unknown	In Service	
BMC 245-16P 4x4		Utility truck	Turkey	14	In Service	Donated by Turkey.
Iveco 4x4		Utility truck	Italy	3+	In Service	Donated by Turkey.

In May 2020, the Somalia's Security Sector Reform twitter account posted a number of pictures of Japanese Toyota 4Runner which had been used to promote COVID-19 awareness.

== Aircraft ==
In 2024, Italy supplied Somalia with four Bell 412 utility helicopters, "marking the most significant delivery of military equipment since the lifting of the arms embargo imposed on Somalia". The United Nations Support Office for Somalia has supported the African Union Transition Mission in Somalia to acquire three helicopters from Burundi.

In addition to aircraft operated by the Somali Armed Forces, the National Intelligence and Security Agency operates Bayraktar TB2 drones.

On November 3, 2025, "Garowe Online" carried a report quoting unnamed Turkish officials about the presence of Turkish-built T129 ATAK attack helicopters in Somalia. The officials commented after repeated reports on social media that Somalia had taken ownership of the T129 attack helicopters. They said the aircraft seen at the ceremony remained under Turkish control; were not part of the Somali National Army's inventory; and were used for training and operational purposes by Turkish personnel stationed in Somalia.

Name	Image	Type	Origin	Quantity	Status	Notes
Unmanned aerial vehicles
Bayraktar Akinci		UCAV	Turkey	2	In Service	
Bayraktar TB2		UCAV	Turkey	5	In Service	
Helicopters
Bell 205 / Bell 412		Utility helicopter	United States; Canada	6	In Service	Initial reports as above indicated four Bell 412s; it appears from the difference between two-bladed and four-bladed that this was in error. Total appears to be at least 6, including 4 Bell 205As and two Bell 412s.

== Radar Vehicles ==
Name	Image	Type	Origin	Quantity	Notes
ALP100G		Radar	Turkey	1	

== Boats ==
Name	Image	Type	Origin	Quantity	Status	Notes
ONUK MRTP 16		Patrol boat	Turkey	Unknown	In Service	
Grand boats RIB		Rigid inflatable boat	Ukraine	Unknown	In Service	

== Individual equipment ==
Model	Origin	Image	Type	Notes
Helmets
FAST	United States; Turkey		Combat helmet	Utilised by Commando Brigade, donated from Turkey.
Camouflage Patterns
Desert Battle Dress Uniform	United States; Somalia		Camouflage pattern	Bought from the U.S. in the 1980s.

== Retired equipment ==
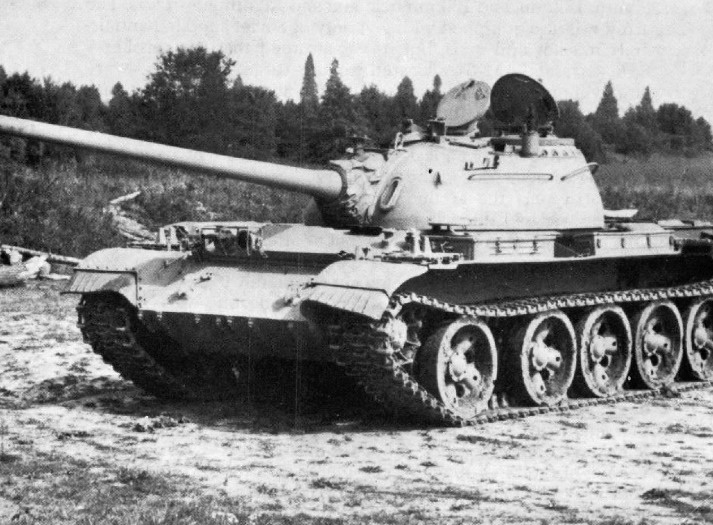
A T-55, one of several SNA tanks

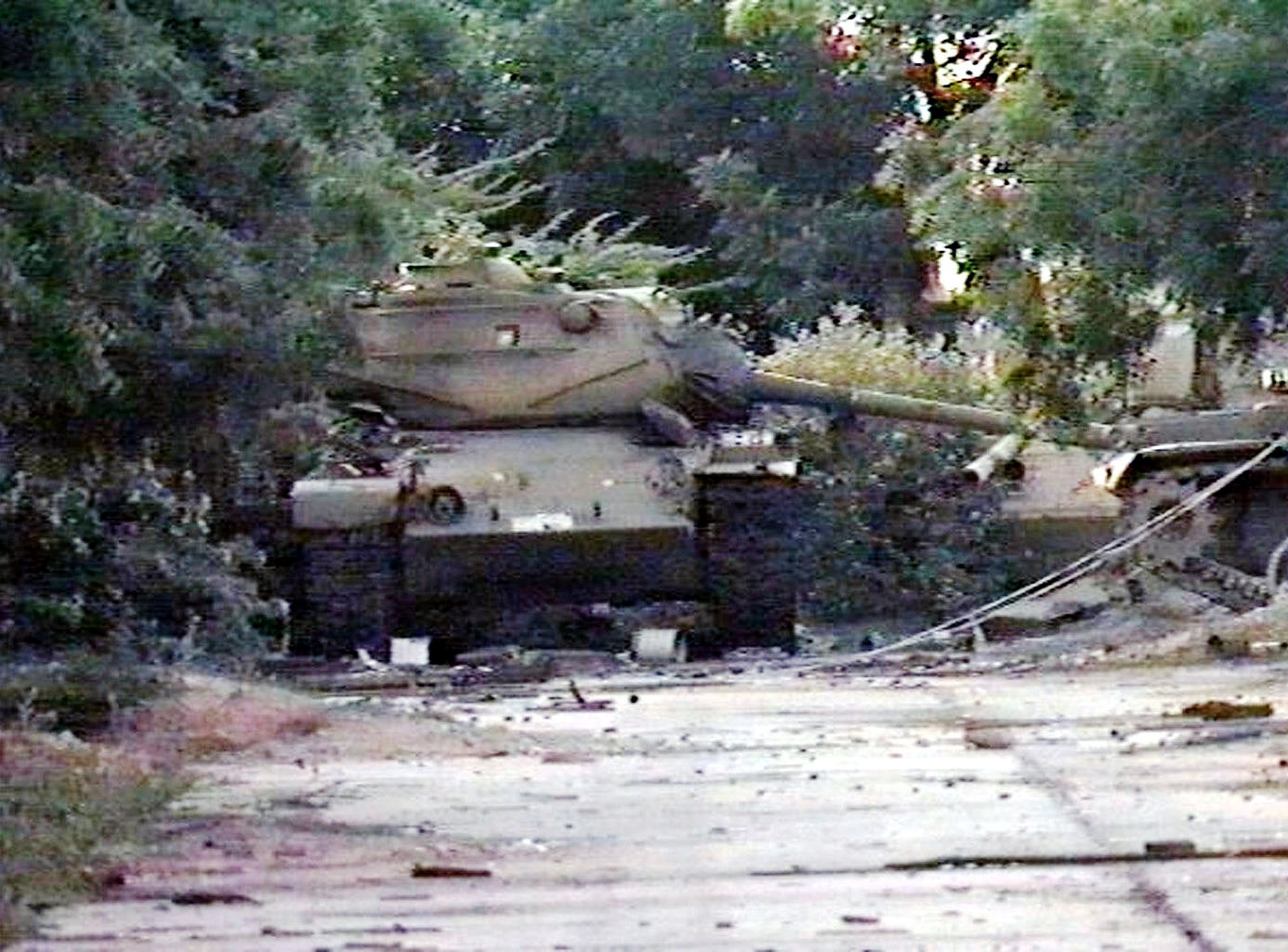
Abandoned Somali M47 Patton tanks in Mogadishu, discovered by U.S. Army troops on 1 December 1993

Among firearms associated with the Somali National Army and reported by Jane's Infantry Weapons 2009/10 were Soviet TT pistols, British Sterling submachine guns; German Heckler & Koch G3 and Belgian FN FAL assault rifles, U.S. M14 rifles, Soviet RPD machine guns; Soviet RPK machine guns; Soviet RP-46 machine guns; French AA-52 machine guns; Belgian FN MAG machine guns; Soviet DShK heavy machine guns; U.S. M2 Browning .50 cal heavy machine guns; and U.S. M79 grenade launchers and Soviet RPG-2 grenade launchers.

After independence, the Somali National Army initially inherited five Comet tanks, six Ferret armoured cars and eighteen Universal Carrier machine-gun carriers from withdrawing British forces.

Previous arms acquisitions included the following equipment, much of which was unserviceable circa June 1989: 293 main battle tanks (30 Centurions; 123 M47 Patton, 30 T-34, 110 T-54/55 from various sources). Christopher F. Foss, writing in the second edition of Jane's Main Battle Tanks said that 'Kuwait was believed to have supplied Somalia with about 35 Centurions.' The Military Balance 1987–88 (p. 112) listed 30 Centurions held by the Somali Army.

Other armoured fighting vehicles included 10 M41 Walker Bulldog light tanks, 30 BRDM-2 and 15 Panhard AML-90 armored cars (formerly owned by Saudi Arabia). The IISS estimated in 1989 that there were 474 armoured personnel carriers, including 64 BTR-40/BTR-50/BTR-60, 100 BTR-152 wheeled armored personnel carriers, 310 Fiat 6614 and 6616s, and that BMR-600s had been reported. SIPRI also reported BTR-70s had been sold to Somalia. The IISS estimated that there were 210 towed artillery pieces (8 M-1944 100 mm, 100 M-56 105 mm, 84 M-1938 122 mm, and 18 M198 155 mm towed howitzers). Other equipment reported by the IISS included 82 mm and 120 mm mortars, 100 Milan and BGM-71 TOW anti-tank guided missiles, rocket launchers, recoilless rifles, and a variety of Soviet air defence guns of 20 mm, 23 mm, 37 mm, 40 mm, 57 mm, and 100 mm calibre. SIPRI also reported that 9K32 Strela-2 air defence missiles had been transferred.

In addition, U.S. M151 trucks had been sold to Somalia by December 1987.

IISS Military Balance 2022 lists only armoured personnel carriers and utility vehicles.

Name	Image	Type	Origin	Quantity	Status	Notes
BRDM-2		Amphibious armored scout car	Soviet Union	Unknown	Retired	
ZU-23-2		Autocannon	Soviet Union	Unknown	Retired	

Name	Image	Type	Origin	Quantity	Status	Notes
Rocket artillery
BM-21 Grad		Multiple rocket launcher	Soviet Union	Unknown	Retired	
