= Aircraft Independent Firing System =

Turkish weapons system

Aircraft Independent Firing System (AIFS) (Turkish: Uçaktan Bağımsız Atış Sistemi; UBAS), is a weapon-employment solution developed by TÜBİTAK SAGE for the Turkish Air Force.

The system allows use of Turkish-made weapons on F-16 Block 40M/Block 50M aircraft that Türkiye does not have the OFP source codes of. UBAS workaround lets the pilot access interface of the weapons using a mounted on the upfront control panel, which is connected to a device which transmits the signals through weapons and the tablet, allowing the pilot to select and view the parameters of the mounted weapon.

This system was also successfully tested on Azerbaijani Air Forces' SU-25M aircraft. The testing process continues.
