= Hisar (missile family) =

Family of short-range to long-range surface to air missile systems

Hisar Air Defence System
- Type: Surface-to-air missile
- Place of origin: Turkey

Service history
- In service: Hisar-A: 2021–present Hisar-O: 2021–present
- Used by: Turkey

Production history
- Designer: Aselsan; Roketsan
- Designed: Hisar-A: 2007–2020; Hisar-O: 2007–2021; Hisar-RF: 2020–2025; Hisar-D: 2022–present
- Manufacturer: Aselsan; Roketsan
- Produced: Hisar-A: 2021–present Hisar-O: 2021–present

Specifications
- Length: Hisar-A+: 3.95 m Hisar-O+/RF: 4.6 m
- Diameter: Hisar-A+: 185 mm Hisar-O+/RF: 185 mm
- Maximum firing range: Hisar-O: 25–40 km
- Warhead: High explosive fragmentation warhead
- Detonation mechanism: Impact and proximity fuze
- Engine: Dual pulse solid propellant
- Operational range: Hisar-A+: 15 km Hisar-O+: 40–60 km (Detection and tracking); Hisar-RF: 40 km
- Flight ceiling: Hisar-A+: 10 km Hisar-O+: 15 km Hisar-RF: 15 km
- Guidance system: Hisar-A/O: Infrared homing Hisar-RF: Active RF seeker

Hisar (Fortress) is a family of short and high to medium air defense surface-to-air missile systems being developed by Roketsan and Aselsan since 2007. The missiles are developed by Roketsan, while most sensors and electronics are developed by Aselsan. The missile family consists of the short range Hisar-A and medium range Hisar-O air defence system. Missile seeker of Hisar-A and Hisar-O is infrared homing. The model using RF Seeker, Hisar O+ RF, and its naval version, Hisar-D RF, were announced later. The long range version “Hisar-U” evolved into the Siper long range air defence system project.

== Development history ==
On 18 April 2007, the Turkish Presidency of Defense Industries issued a request for information to international and domestic defence companies to meet a low to medium altitude air defense requirements under Turkey's Low Altitude Air Defence Missile System (T-LALADMIS) programme (Alçak İrtifa Hava Savunma Füze Sistemi in Turkish). A total of 18 companies responded to the RFI.

A subsequent request for proposal was issued on 28 September 2008, for the direct acquisition of 18 systems and options for up to 27 additional systems. Following the initial missile tests of which was held for Hisar-A in 2013 and Hisar-O in 2014 the system got into production phase. The final contract was eventually awarded to Aselsan as the prime contractor on 20 June 2015. Other sub-contractors include Tübitak Sage for warhead and battery and Meteksan Savunma for data link. The award consist of a low-altitude system for 314,9 million euros and a medium-altitude system (T-MALADMIS) for 241.4 million euros.

In a test on 7 December 2017, a steep-trajectory firing was carried out for the first time from the HİSAR systems, while their 360-degrees protection was also tested successfully. Flight and ballistic tests were also carried out. For the first time in the campaign, within which control and guidance capabilities of the HİSAR missiles met expectations, radar, command-control and fire control, electro-optic and communications elements of the HİSAR systems were also included for the first time. Target aircraft, target detection and follow-up, command and fire control and mid-range bombsight tests were successfully performed.

In September 2020, Ismail Demir also revealed that first products of Hisar-A will enter the inventory in 2020, in a press conference in Ankara. At the Defense Industry meeting held on 20 December 2022, it was decided that Türkiye would start mass production of air defense products. A year after this decision, on 15 December 2023, a contract worth more than $1.5 billion was signed between Aselsan, Roketsan and Tübitak SAGE companies and the Turkish Land Forces and the Turkish Air Force for the mass production of Hisar, Siper and other air defense missiles. According to the contract, the mass production products of the Hisar varieties and other air defense missile systems will be delivered to the Turkish Armed Forces between 2025 and 2029. Speaking at the contract ceremony, Turkish Defense Minister Yaşar Güler said that Hisar and other defense products were produced domestically. Aselsan CEO Ahmet Akyol said that the production of Hisar air defense systems continued in 2024. He also stated that the chips of the missiles, radars and other electronic parts were designed by them and thousands of these chips were produced. Defence Industry Agency President Haluk Görgün announced that a mass-produced Hisar-O/RF battery successfully shot down a test aircraft 40 km away on 15 August 2024. In another test conducted in January 2025, the infrared seeker version of Hisar-O, which was also produced in mass production, successfully destroyed the test aircraft.

=== Test and development timeline ===
- On 20 June 2015, Aselsan was awarded with a contract to produce Hisar surface to-air missile.
- On 8 December 2016, Hisar-O conducted its first missile test successfully.
- On 7 December 2017, a steep-trajectory firing test conducted.
- On 1 February 2018, Hisar-A conducted a successful missile test in Aksaray province of Turkey.
- On 12 October 2019, Hisar-A finish its final development tests and approved by the defence ministry for mass production.
- On 16 December 2020, the Hisar-A+ made its final test in order to be in the inventory.
- On 6 January 2020, the Hisar-A+ started mass production.
- On 9 March 2021, the Hisar-O medium-range air defense systems passes high altitude tests.
- On 26 March 2021, the Hisar-A+ hits a target drone in a test-firing of the air defense systems.
- On 3 May 2021, the Hisar-A+ air defense missile system successfully conducted its acceptance tests in Aksaray Shooting Range and got into the inventory of the Turkish Armed Forces.
- On 12 July 2021, the President of Defense Industries Dr. Ismail Demir announced that dozens of Hisar-A+ joined in the army and Hisar-O+ are in mass production by Roketsan and Aselsan.
- On 19 February 2022 the Hisar-O+ begins delivery to Turkish Army.
- On 4 April 2022 Ukraine interested in the Hisar-O+.
- On 15 August 2024 was completed a test fire of Hisar O+ missile and the missile reached 40+ km range.

== Hisar-A+ ==
Hisar-A (Turkish: Alçak İrtifa Hava Savunma Füze Sistemi) is based on an FNSS ACV-30 tracked vehicle chassis armed with four vertically launched Hisar-A short-range missiles supplied by Roketsan. The tracked Hisar-A system mounts its own mast-mounted Aselsan MAR radar and an electro-optical/infrared (EO/IR) system, allowing it to operate as an independent, standalone system without the need to rely on information from other systems. Hisar-A has dual pulse solid propellant rocket motor, making it effective against highly maneuverable air targets, although the 5 km maximum engagement altitude is a limitation. Recently Roketsan has developed an improved version of the missile, called Hisar A+. Although its range is still limited to the maximum of 15 km, the max engagement altitude was increased from 5 km to 8 km, and laser-based proximity fuse was replaced with an RF-based one from TÜBİTAK SAGE. The IIR-based seeker made by Aselsan has not been changed. The usage of IR imaging technology makes it highly resistant to various countermeasures. Test video has shown the missile hitting a practice target after using the second pulse of the rocket motor which accelerated the missile in terminal stage of the angagement. While the missile did not achieve a direct hit, the warhead was detonated by the proximity fuse, when it was passing the target. For midcourse guidance Hisar-A uses an inertial navigation system (INS) and an RF data link. Terminal guidance is provided by an infrared imaging (IIR) seeker head. Despite the improved variant being available, some platforms will continue using the base Hisar-A model. The rest will be upgraded with Hisar-A+ or will utilise a mix of HISAR-A+ and HISAR-O, which improves the system's versatility and flexibility.

- Minimum range: 2 km
- Maximum range: 15+ km
- Maximum altitude: 5 / 8 km

It was announced in 2020 that some orders on HİSAR-A would be replaced in favour of HİSAR-O which has a slightly longer effective engagement range and higher maximum altitude despite the size staying the same.

== Hisar-O+ ==
Hisar-O (Turkish: Orta İrtifa Hava Savunma Füze Sistemi) is a vertically launched medium-range SAM system mounted on a Mercedes-Benz Zetros chassis.

Hisar-O missile system is very similar to the Hisar-A family, and uses same type of IIR seeker, RF link, proximity fuse and dual-pulsed rocket motor. The dimensions of the missile have been increased in length out to around 4.2m. Another improvement is the installation of Aselsan's Kalkan phased array 3D search and track radar on the launcher vehicle. There is a new variant of Hisar-O, called Hisar-O+.

The Hisar-O system has the capability to detect, track and identify targets, perform command and control and fire control functions autonomously. The missile system is effective against fighter aircraft, attack helicopters, cruise missiles and unmanned aerial vehicles.

The system's general features also include management and distribution of command and control information, air defense mission planning at the battery and battalion levels, multiple engagement and successive firing, data links for midcourse guidance, integrated air picture generation, operational capabilities in the day, at night and in adverse weather conditions, a global positioning system (GPS) and navigation, remote control, wired or wireless communication between systems, 360° effective area with the capability of vertical launch, Multi-Target Multi-Radar fusion and embedded simulation, identification friend or foe (IFF), modular structure, hybrid control system.

- Minimum range of the missile: 3 km
- Maximum range of the missile: 25+ km with IIR and 40+ km with RF
- Maximum altitude of the missile: 15 km
- Fighter detection & track range : 40–60 km
- Number of tracks : > 60 targets
- Ready to fire missiles:
  - Per vehicle: 6
  - Battery level: ≥ 18 (3 missile launcher vehicles)
  - Battalion level: ≥ 54 (9 missile launcher vehicles)
- Guidance:
  - Midcourse guidance: Inertial navigation through data link from fire-control system
  - Terminal guidance: Infrared homing missile seeker
- Vehicles types used by Hisar-O system:
  - Kalkan phased array 3D radar vehicle
  - Electro-optical suit vehicle
  - Tactical data link connection system vehicle
  - Fire control center vehicle
  - Missile launcher vehicle

On 27 August 2025, three Hisar-O systems consisting of 21 vehicles were delivered to the Turkish Armed Forces at a ceremony attended by Erdoğan. It was later announced that a standard battery of a Hisar-O system consists of 7 vehicles.

== Hisar-RF and Hisar-D ==
A new missile called Hisar-RF is under development. While the standard Hisar-A and Hisar-Os work with an IR seeker, Hisar RF is the RF seeker-using version of Hisar-O+ and was first tested in August 2020. Hisar RF was successfully tested in 2023. It was announced that the range of Hisar-RF will be greater than Hisar-O+. Hisar-D, the naval version of Hisar-RF, was announced and the first test was successfully carried out in 2024.Hisar-D RF successfully hit targets at altitudes of 10 and 800 meters during a test conducted with MİDLAS from TCG İstanbul.

== Operational history ==
On 3 March 2020, Turkey stated that the system would be deployed at the strategically important T-4 airbase in Syria's Idlib province as part of Operation Spring Shield.

In June 2026, the Sudanese Armed Forces used the HİSAR-A during the Sudanese civil war to shoot down a Rapid Support Forces (RSF) drone over Khartoum. The RSF also claimed to have destroyed a HİSAR-A system near Omdurman.

== Operators ==
=== Current Operator ===
Sudan

- Sudanese Armed Forces - Used during Sudanese Civil War.

Turkey

- Turkish Air Force
- Turkish Land Forces
- Turkish Naval Forces

=== Future Operators ===
Indonesia

- Indonesian Air Force - Signed during 2022 Indo Defence Expo. Part of Trisula air defence system.

=== Potential Operators ===
Bangladesh

- Bangladesh Air Force - Reportedly shown interest to procure Hisar air defence system for their new medium-range surface to air missile system (MR-SAM) project.

Malaysia

- Malaysian Army - Some open source reportedly said Rejimen Artileri Diraja air defence unit of Malaysian Army being offered with Hisar-A short range air defence system (SHORAD) to replace their obsolete Rapier Jernas short range air defence systems.
- Royal Malaysian Air Force - Roketsan reportedly offering Hisar-O+ medium range air defence system to Royal Malaysian Air Force (RMAF) for their medium range air defence system (MERAD) procurement.

Pakistan

- Pakistan Air Force

== Foreign interest ==
Bangladesh has expressed interest in the Hisar-O+ air defense system.

Indonesia has signed a contract for the purchase of a variant of the Hisar-O and SİPER surface-to-air missile system from Turkish defense company Roketsan at Indo Defence 2022. The system is known as the Trisula-O and Trisula-U, and it is made specifically to meet Indonesia's operational requirements. The system will eventually be used by the Indonesian Air Force.

== See also ==
- SİPER

=== Weapons of comparable role, performance and era ===
- IRIS-T – (Germany, Italy, Sweden, Greece)
- CAMM – (United Kingdom, Italy)
- NASAMS – (Norway, United States)
- VL MICA – (France)
- SPYDER – (Israel)
- Barak 8 – (India, Israel)
- Multi-Mission Launcher – (United States)
- VL-SRSAM – (India)
- Khordad 15 – (Iran)
