= Aselsan Albatros-K =

Turkish unmanned combat surface vessel

Albatros-K
Class overview
- Name: Albatros-K
- Builders: Aselsan
- Operators: Turkish Navy

General characteristics Albatros-K
- Type: Unmanned surface vehicle
- Length: 10–16 m (33–52 ft)
- Beam: 4.50 m (14.8 ft)
- Propulsion: 2x Diesel inboard motors
- Speed: 35 kn (65 km/h; 40 mph)
- Range: 10 nmi (19 km; 12 mi)

Albatros-K is a Turkish catamaran-type high-speed unmanned surface vessel (USV) of the Turkish Navy developed by the Turkish defense company Aselsan.

== History ==
The catamaran-type USV Albatros-K (Turkish: İnsansız Deniz Aracı, İDA) was developed by the Turkish state-owned defense company Aselsan for the needs of the Turkish Naval Forces. She entered service with the Turkish Navy in 2017 following naval tests and shooting training.

== Characteristics ==
Albatros-K is a catamaran-type unmanned high-speed craft of the Aselsan Albatros USV family, developed to be used as a moving seaborne target of artillery gunfire, close-in weapon and guided missile shooting by surface and air platforms at naval trainings at naval trainings. She is capable of performing specified scenarios in autonomous, semi-autonomous or remote command mode of navigation. Various target tasks can be carried out with different payloads. The real-time images of the target boat during the training are taken and transferred to the control station by Aselsan ARI-1T rotary-wing drone.

She is 10–16 m (33–52 ft) long, and has a beam of 4.50 m (14.8 ft). She weighs 3,000–5,000 kg (6,600–11,000 lb). She can cruise at a speed of 35 kn (65 km/h; 40 mph) within a controllable range of 10 nmi (19 km; 12 mi) in total operation time of 6 hours. The craft is powered by two Diesel inboard motors at tail.

== See also ==
- Aselsan Albatros USV family
- Aselsan Albatros-S, swarm-type USV
