= REDET =

Turkish electronic warfare system

REDET (Turkish: Radar Elektronik Destek/Elektronik Taarruz, Radar ED/ET, lit. 'Radar Electronic Support Electronic Attack') is a Turkish electronic warfare system developed by Aselsan.

The Radar Electronic Warfare (ED) component detects and identifies threat radars and creates an electronic warfare order. The Radar Electronic Warfare (ET) component implements electronic warfare actions of deception or jamming to reduce the coverage of the target radars or to disable them.

Deliveries of REDET-II, known as VURAL, started in 2019.

REDET systems were included into the Steel Dome system.
