= Aselsan Albatros USV family =

Albatros USV family (Turkish: Albatros İnsansız Su Üstü Hedefi Ailesi) consists of high-speed unmanned surface seaborne targets of catamaran-type Albatros-K, swarm-type Albatros-S and V-hull-type Albatros-T built by the Turkish defense company Aselsan for the needs of the Turkish Naval Forces.

== Overview ==
Albatros USV family members are high-speed seaborne targets developed by the Turkish state-owned defense company Aselsan, consisting of catamaran-type Albatros-K', swarm-type Albatros-S, and V-hull-type Albatros-T. They are intended to be used by the Turkish Naval Forces Command's surface elements in target missions in countering asymmetric threats and shooting training with fast surface target.

In addition to serving as asymmetrical fast surface targets, the boats can imitate radar cross sectional area of assault boat or frigate, maneuver and speed movements, and are successfully used as surface targets in surface artillery, close-defense weapon systems and guided missile shooting.

The maneuver patterns needed in Albatros USVs are defined by pre-planning or on-site processing, and the boats are used effectively by making various tactical movements such as zig-zag drawing or direct fast attack.

== History ==
The Albatros USVs have been in use in naval exercises like "Deniz Kurdu" ("Sea Wolf") and "Mavi Vatan" ("Blue Homeland") and surface shooting trainings by the Turkish Naval Forces since 2017.
