= Aselsan =

Turkish military electronics equipment company

Aselsan A.Ş.
- Type: Anonim Şirket
- Traded as: BİST: ASELS
- Industry: Defense; Software; Electronics
- Founded: 1975; 51 years ago
- Headquarters: Ankara, Turkey
- Key people: Ahmet Akyol (CEO)
- Products: Communication systems, radars, avionics, electronic warfare systems, air defense systems, targeting systems
- Revenue: ▲$3.48 billion (2024)
- Operating income: ▼$791 million (2024)
- Net income: ▼$441 million (2024)
- Total assets: ▲$7.03 billion (2024)
- Total equity: ▲$4.09 billion (2024)
- Number of employees: 12,014 (2024)
- Website: www.aselsan.com/en

Aselsan A.Ş. (Turkish: Askerî Elektronik Sanayi A.Ş., lit. 'Military Electronic Industries S.A.') is a Turkish defense corporation headquartered in Ankara, Turkey. Its main operating area is research, development and manufacture of advanced military products for air, land and maritime forces. The company is one of the major contractors of the Turkish Armed Forces. Aselsan was ranked by Defense News as the 48th largest defense company in terms of revenue. The Turkish Army Foundation is the founder, and its successor, the Turkish Armed Forces Foundation, is the major stockholder.

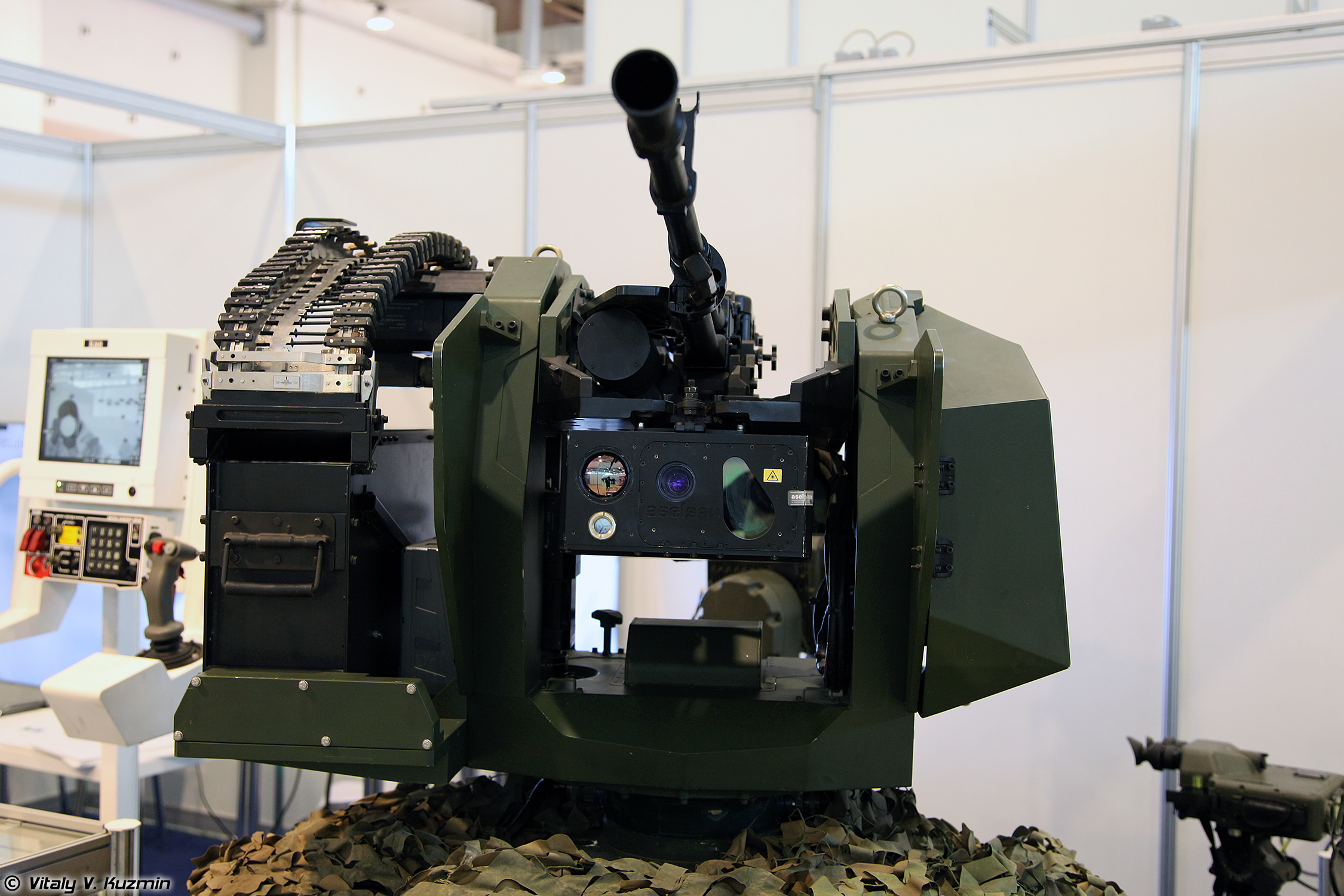
Aselsan SARP remote weapon turret

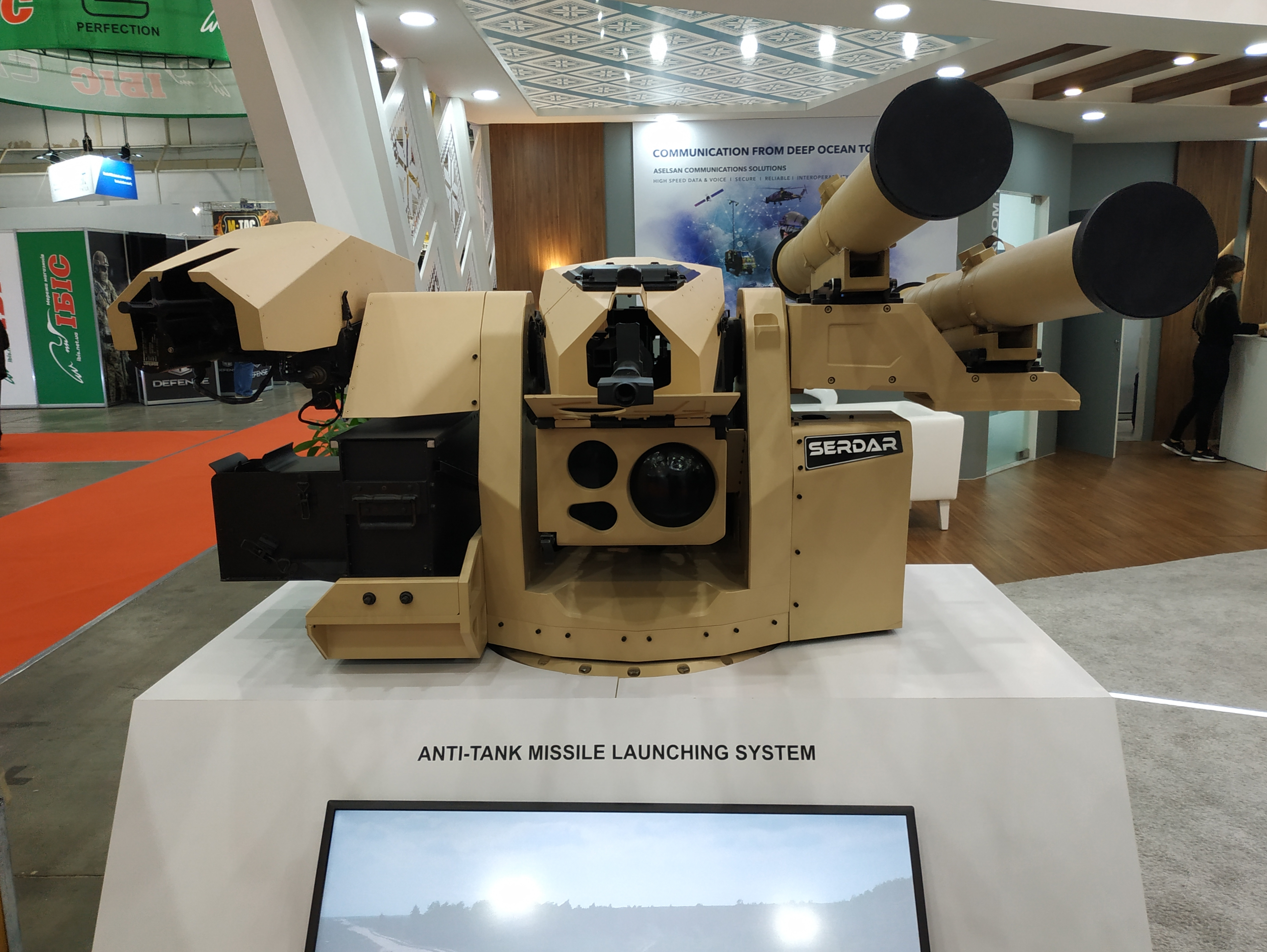
Aselsan Serdar Anti-tank Missile launching system with remote weapon turret

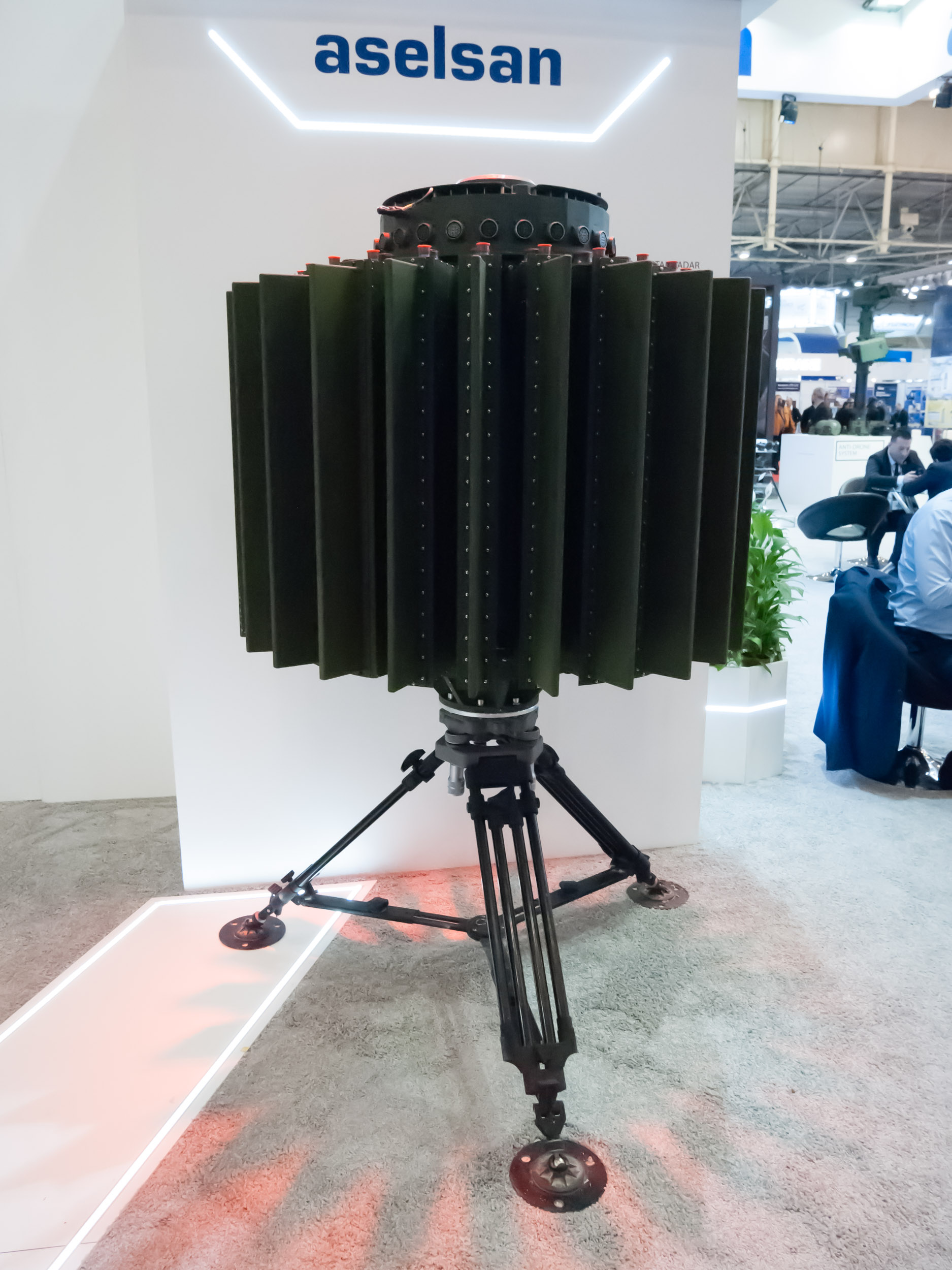
Aselsan Serhat counter mortar radar

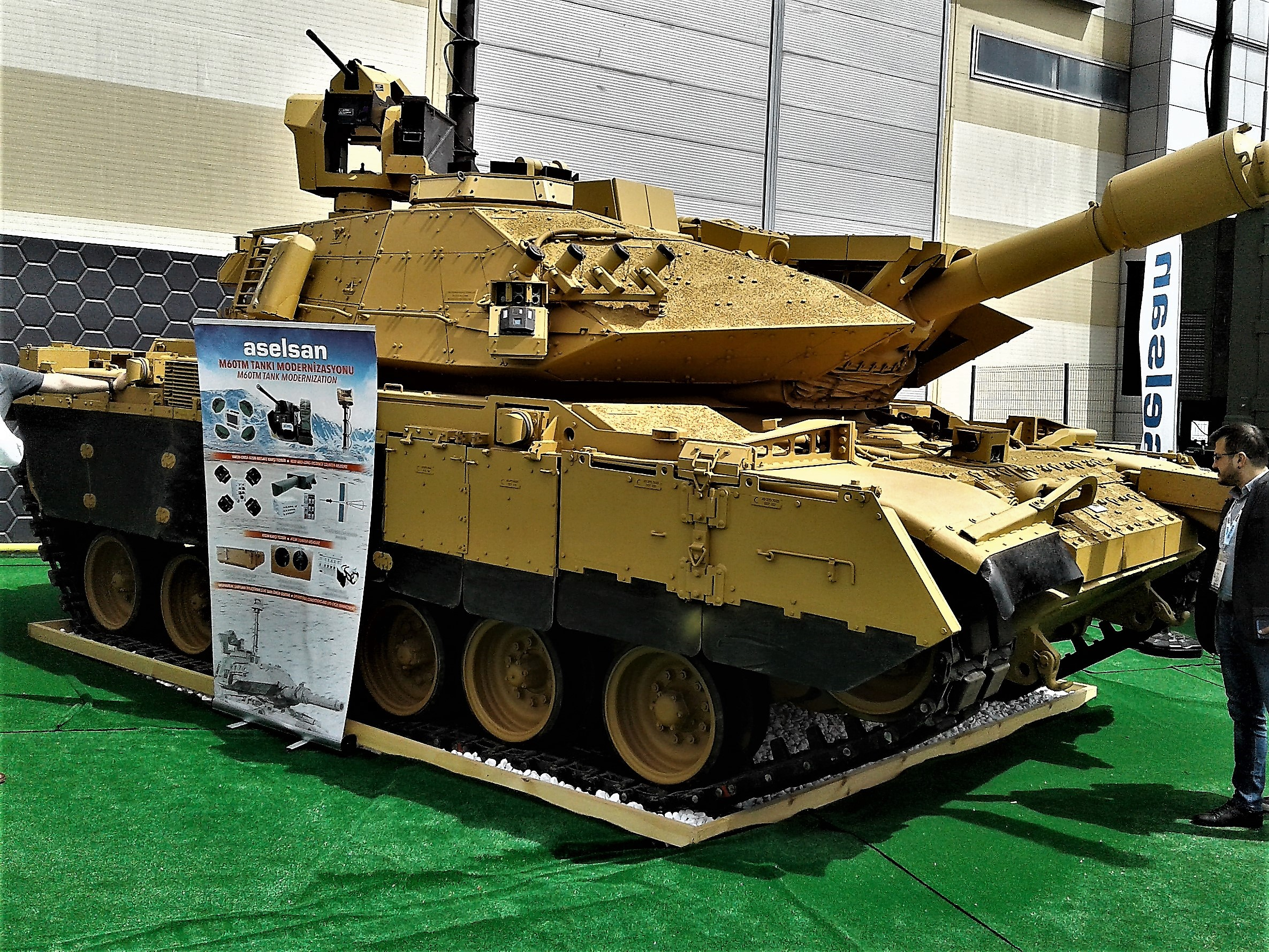
M60TM modernized by Aselsan

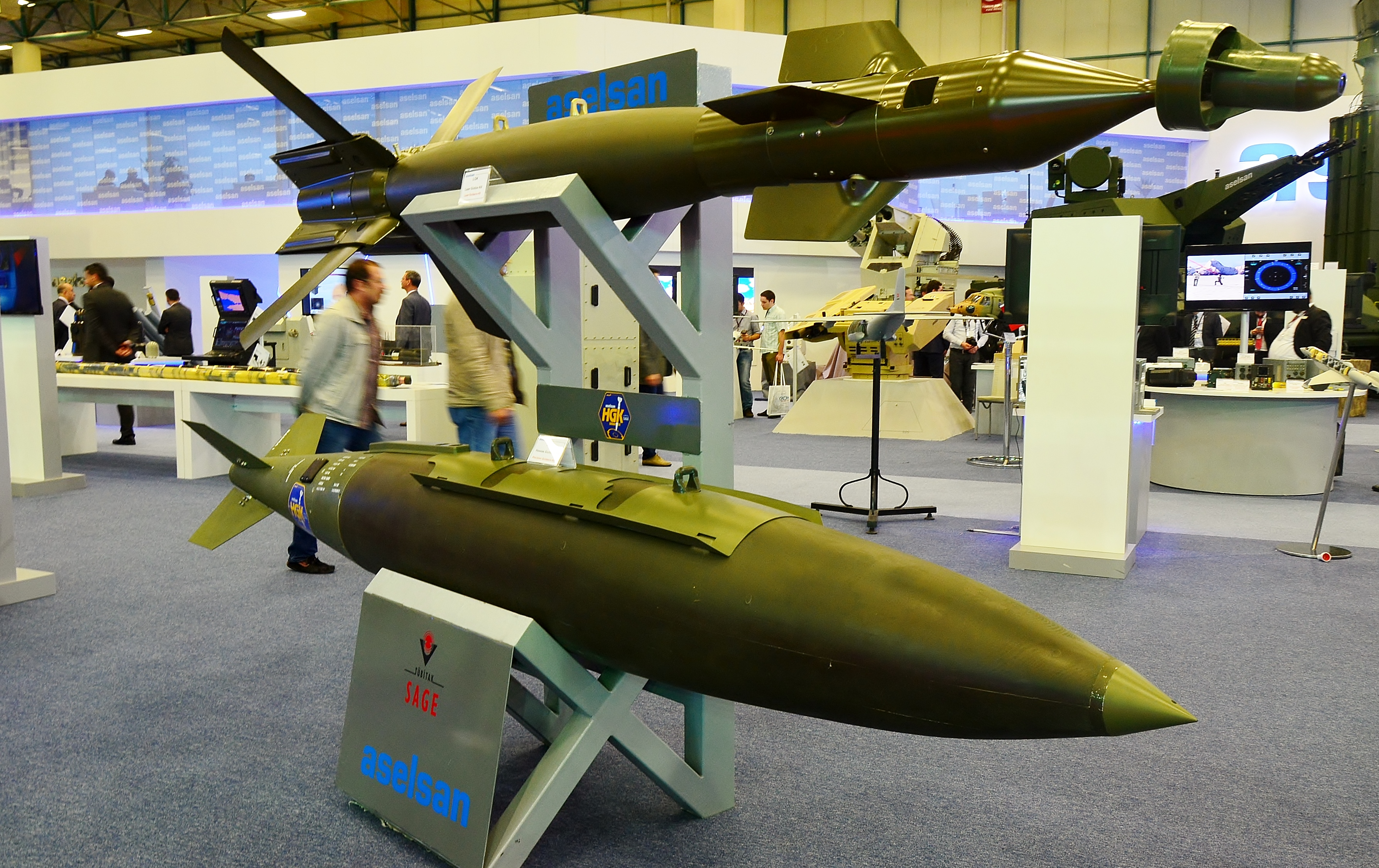
Precicison guidance kit HGK of TÜBİTAK SAGE and Aselsan at IDEF 2015

== History ==
Aselsan was founded by the Turkish Army Foundation in 1975 after US's decision to put an embargo on Turkey due to the Turkish invasion of Cyprus. The first CEO of Aselsan was M. Hacim Kamoy.

In early 1979, after completing investments including card payment systems and establishing the necessary infrastructure, Aselsan started production at its Macunköy facilities in Ankara. Since then, Aselsan has expanded its product and customer portfolio, mostly based on indigenous research and development, locally trained personnel, and in cooperation with other Turkish research institutions and universities.

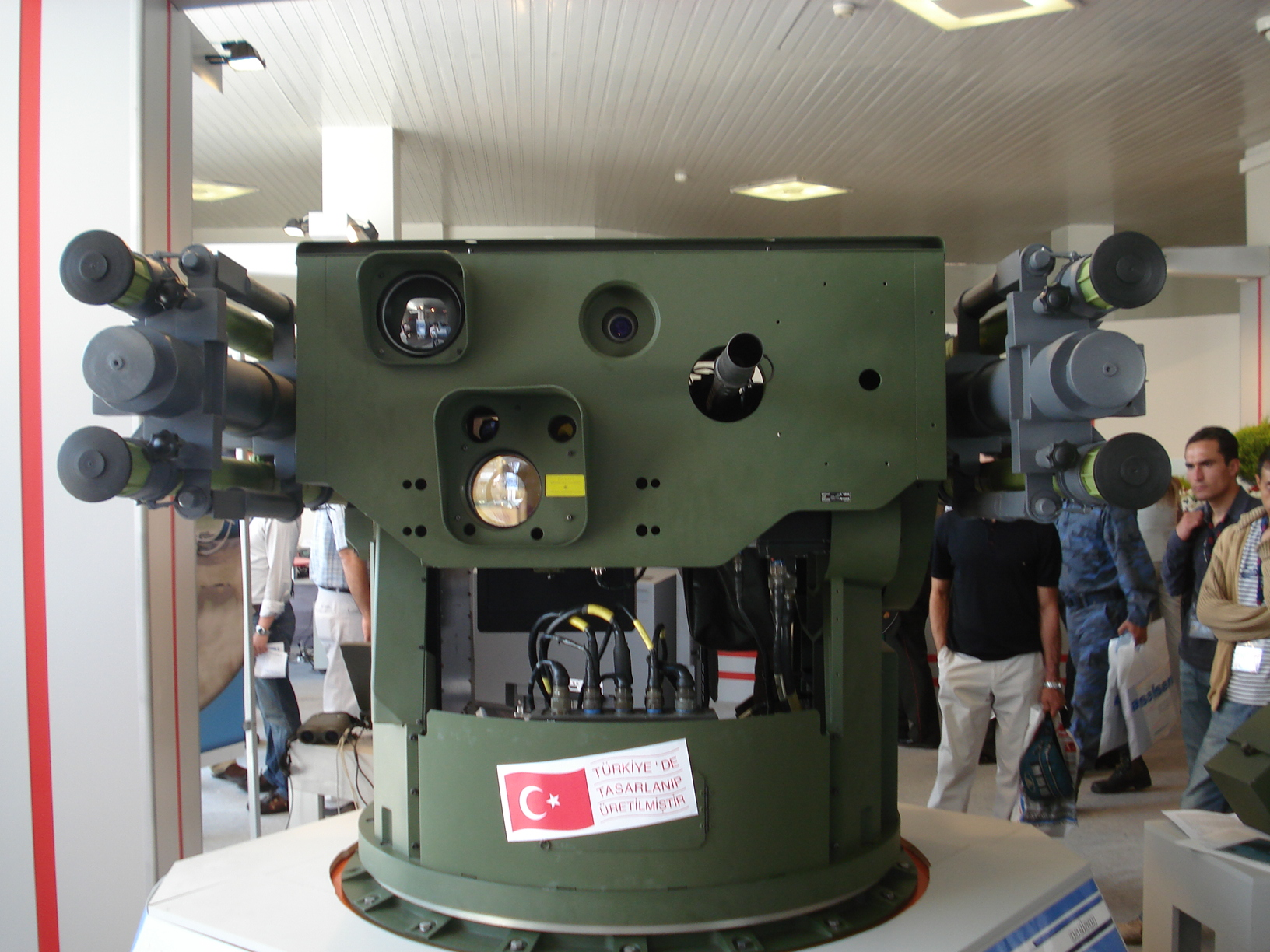
Zıpkın PMADS Stinger launch platform with 12.7 mm automatic machine gun

On August 27, 2025, Aselsan delivered a 47 piece high, medium, and low-altitude air defense system and radar, totaling $460 million, to the Turkish Armed Forces at a ceremony attended by President Erdoğan in Ankara. It was announced that these deliveries were the first component of Türkiye's air defense project, the Steel Dome including ALP 100-G,ALP 300-G, Hisar, Siper, Korkut . Erdoğan stated that one Siper system consisting of 10 vehicles, three Hisar systems consisting of 21 vehicles, seven PUHU and two REDET electronic warfare systems were delivered. On 26 November 2025, the Turkish Defence Agency signed a $6.5 billion contract with Aselsan, Havelsan, and Roketsan for the procurement of new air-defense systems for the Steel Dome project.

== Organization ==
Aselsan designs, develops and manufactures modern electronic systems for military and industrial customers in Turkey and abroad. The company headquarters is located at Macunköy facilities in Ankara, Turkey. According to the field of activities, Aselsan has been organized in five business sectors:

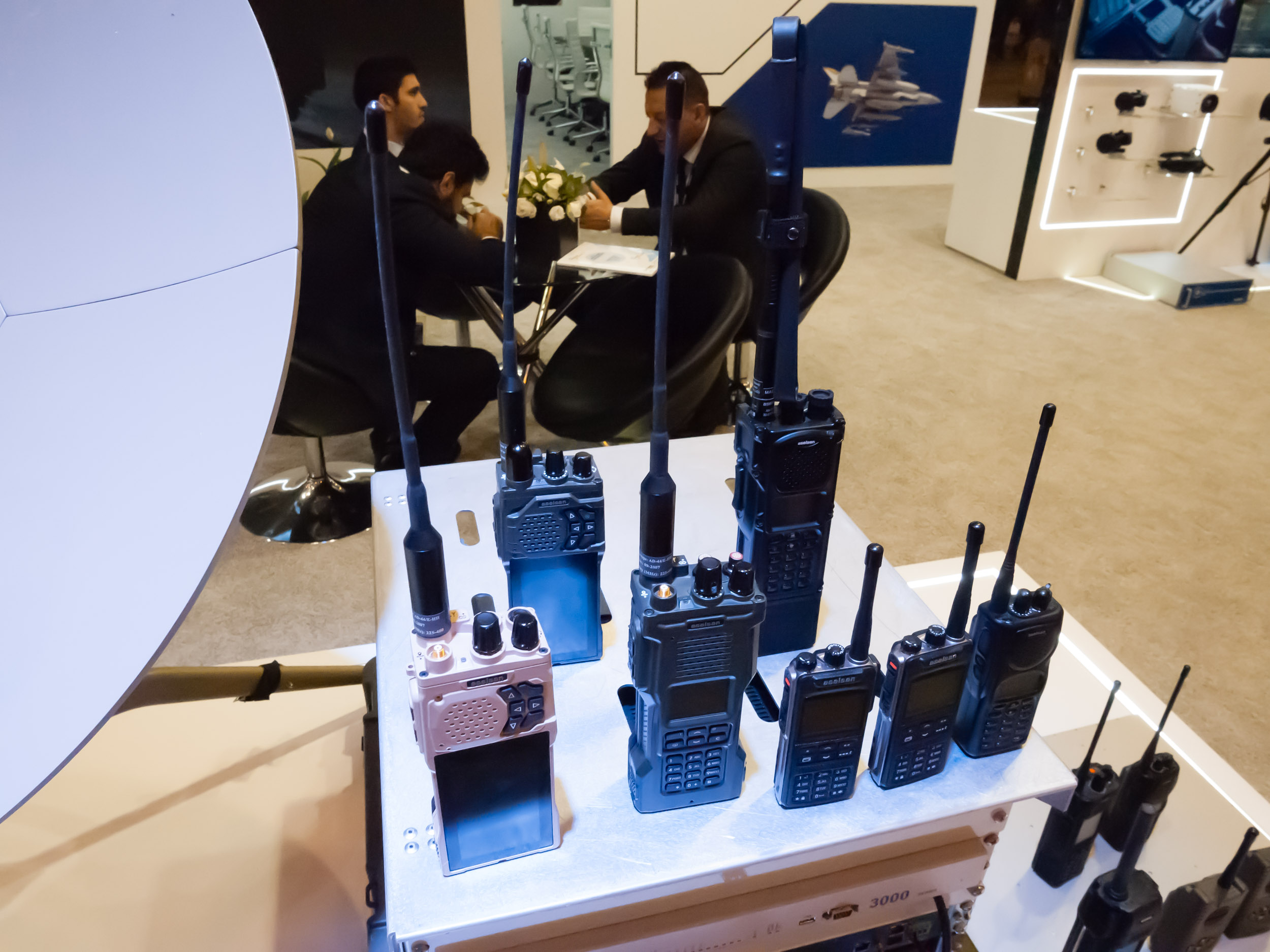
Aselsan military communication devices

- Communication and Information Technologies Business Sector (HBT),
- Microelectronics, Guidance and Electro-Optics Business Sector (MGEO),
- Radar and Electronic Warfare Systems Business Sector (REHIS),
- Defense Systems Technologies Business Sector (SST),
- Transportation, Security, Energy and Automation Systems Business Sector (UGES).

The HBT, REHIS, SST and UGES sectors have high-technology and automated infrastructure in engineering and production at Macunköy facilities. Electronic production includes surface mount technology, multilayer and flexible printed circuit boards, mechanical and mould productions, system integration and test fields. While the HBT sector's main product spectrum covers military and professional communications systems, REHIS sector's main operations are focused on radar, electronic warfare and SST sector's main operations are focused on command-control systems. The MGEO sector manufactures hybrid microelectronic circuits, night-vision devices, thermal cameras, laser ranger/designators and inertial navigation systems at Akyurt facilities.

In all business sectors, methodologies complying with military standards and ISO 9001 are applied using computer-aided design (CAD), computer-aided engineering (CAE) and computer-aided manufacturing (CAM) technologies.

Aselsan is a member of TÜMAKÜDER and IPC.

== Facilities ==
=== Domestic expansion ===
==== AB MikroNano Chip Factory ====
On 23 December 2014, Bilkent University and Aselsan jointly established Türkiye's first commercial chip factory. The factory began operations in 2017 primarily to produce GaN. The factory produces various chips for radars, missiles and other systems produced by Aselsan.

==== Radar and Electronic Warfare Technology Center ====
Aselsan opened its new facility (Turkish: ASELSAN Radar ve Elektronik Harp Teknoloji Merkezi) in Gölbaşı district of Ankara on 16 March 2015. Built in three years at a cost of US$157 million, the site serves for the production of radar and electronic warfare equipment required by the Turkish Armed Forces (Army, Navy, Air Force), space and unmanned platforms. The facility covers an area of 75,000 m^{2} (810,000 sq ft) on a land of 35 ha (86 acres). A total of 776 engineers, 261 technical personnel and more than 200 support personnel are employed in the center.

The technology center serves for the design, research and development, production, test and logistic support of primarily long-range tracking air defense and fighter aircraft radar systems, as well as other radar and electronic warfare systems and antennas, microwave power modules and software.

==== Air Defense Test and Integration Center ====
On 2 December 2022, Aselsan opened the Air Defense Test and Integration Center (HSTEM) in Ankara. The center includes a System Production and Integration Factory with a closed area of 12 thousand square meters, a Test Control Center, a Closed Firing Range, a System Test, Adjustment Calibration Infrastructure, a Test Tower and Test Tracks, and a ROBOSİM Open Area Test Infrastructure. The facility carries out production, testing, analysis, and necessary performance improvements for air defense systems developed by Aselsan.

==== Photon Detector and Nanotechnology Facility ====
In March 2025, Aselsan announced that it will establish a new Photon Detector and Nanotechnology Facility, Radar System Integration and Production Facility, Air Defense Systems Production and Test Facility, and Smart Ammunition Production Facility in Ankara. It reported to Borsa Istanbul's Public Disclosure Platform that Aselsan will spend $616 million for these investments. It was also stated that Aselsan will hire a total of 2,244 people, 1,672 of whom will be qualified, for these facilities.

==== Ogulbey Technology Base ====
Aselsan launched construction on a large facility in the Oğulbey district of Ankara on 27 August 2025, at a ceremony attended by President Erdoğan. The statement noted that Aselsan's current factories total 5,000 acres, while the new Oğulbey Technology Base in Ankara will be 6,500 acres. The new base is expected to cost $1.5 billion and will double Aselsan's production capacity upon its commissioning. Speaking at the groundbreaking ceremony, Erdoğan stated that this facility will mark Aselsan's next 50 years and will become Europe's largest air defense facility. Erdoğan also inaugurated 14 new Aselsan facilities, built at a cost of $280 million, on the same day.

=== International expansion ===
Aselsan has associated companies in Azerbaijan, Kazakhstan, Saudi Arabia, and United Arab Emirates. Besides, the company announced in October 2015 that they are planning to expand their South African business "by seeking partnerships to form a private company out of its local branch Aselsan South Africa"

==== Aselsan Baku ====
Aselsan Baku was founded on 11 February 1998 by Aselsan in Azerbaijan. It currently produces civil and military hand-held radios in Azerbaijan. The capital of the company was fully invested by Aselsan. The company, which will operate in the fields of sales, maintenance-repair and production and whose founding capital is determined as USD 500 thousand, has been the first company established by Aselsan abroad.

The laser guidance kit produced by Aselsan in 2018 was integrated into the ammunition developed by Azerbaijan.

==== Aselsan Ukraine ====
Aselsan Ukraine was established on 1 September 2020 by Aselsan in Ukraine.

==== Aselsan Middle East ====
Aselsan Middle East was established on 19 July 2012 by Aselsan in Jordan.

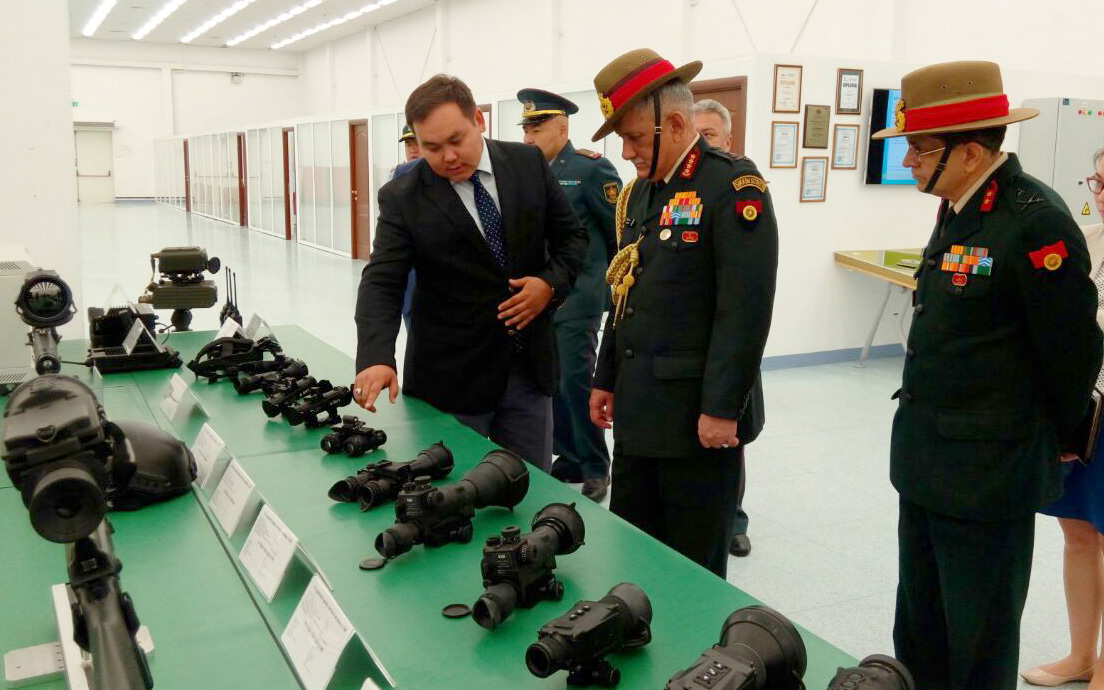
Aselsan Engineering Defence Industrial Base, in Kazakhstan

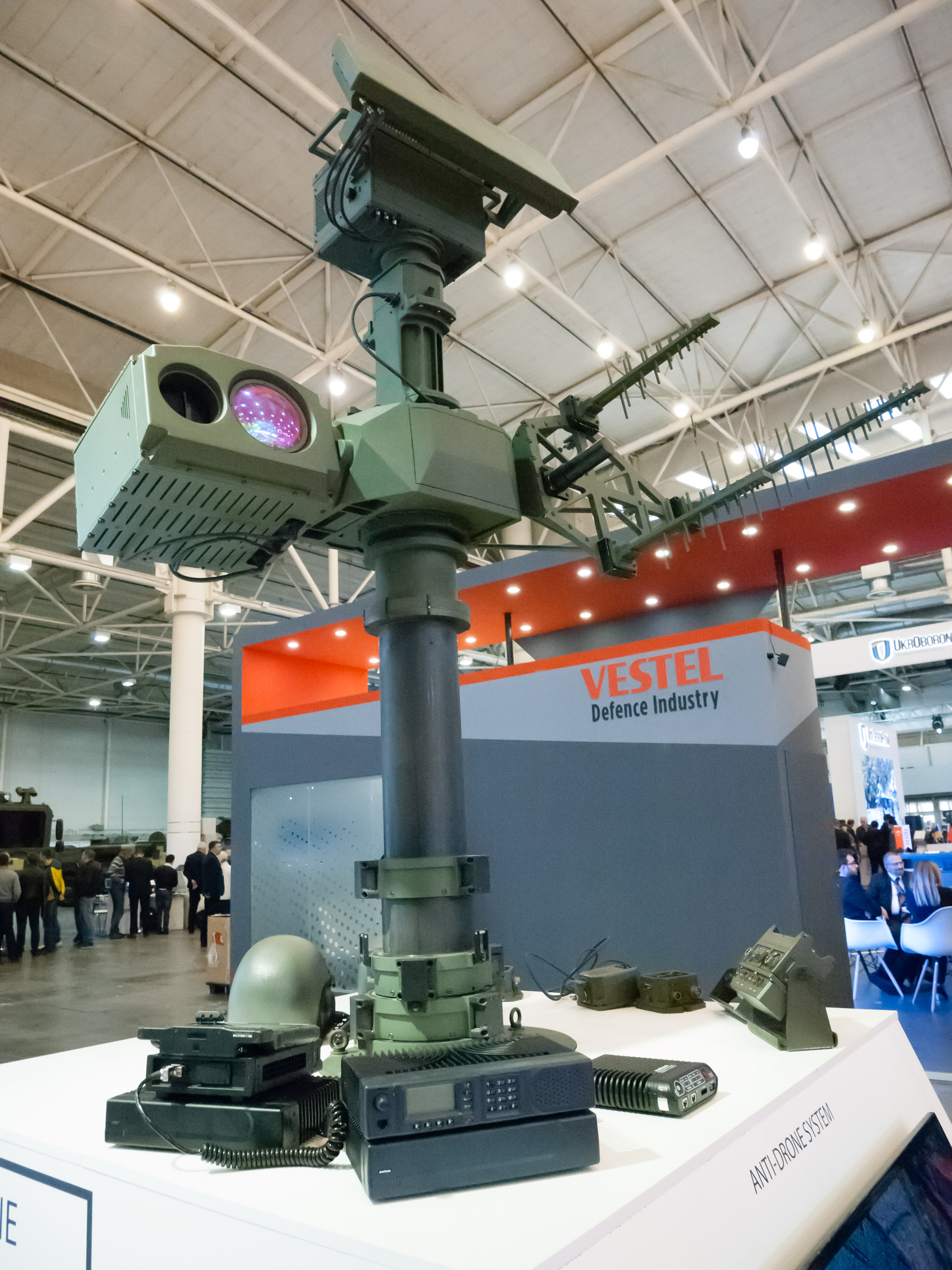
Aselsan anti-drone system

== Products ==
Aselsan is present in many areas, especially in defense industry product supply and research and development activities.

- Albatros USV family, family of unmanned target craft
  - Albatros K catamaran-type unmanned surface vehicles
  - Albatros-S, swarm-type unmanned surface vehicle
  - Albatros-T unmanned surface vehicles
- ALP Radar family
  - ALP 100-G mobile multifunction air surveillance AESA radar
  - ALP 300-G mobile long range early warning AESA radar
- Amphibious landing ship project (LST)
- ARI 1-T rotary wing miniature UAV
- ASELPOD Electro-optical targeting system
- AYAC military routing and switching device
- Biometric integrity verification and access control systems (BKDGKS)
- Comparison of communication solutions
- Çelik Kubbe (Steel Dome),
- EIRS Early-warning radar
- Ejderha/AD 200, a directed-energy weapon (DEW), a High-Power Electromagnetic (HPEM) Countermeasure System.
- Field telephone
- Fixed central radio peripherals and accessories
- ASELSAN FULMAR 500-A is an airborne, multi-function X-band AESA surveillance radar developed for both manned and unmanned aerial and maritime platforms, capable of long-range air, land and surface target detection and tracking, while providing SAR/ISAR imaging, maritime surveillance, weather monitoring, and search-and-rescue operations.
- GÖKALP Counter-UAV System
- GOKDENIZ close-in weapon system
- GÖKTAN missile
- GÖKSUR SAM-based CIWS
- GRC-5220 tactical broadband Ethernet radio family
- GÜRZ SHORAD air defense system
- Hisar short and medium-range air defence systems
- Integrated marine communication systems
- IP remote control system
- KALKAN air defence radar
- KAPLAN unmanned ground vehicle family
- KILIÇ 10 & KILIÇ 200 Kamikaze Autonomous Underwater Vehicle
- KORKUT 35 mm self-propelled anti-aircraft gun (SPAAG)
- KORAL electronic warfare system
- LEVENT unmanned surface vehicle
- Logistics support vessels (LDG)
- MEROPS, (Multi-spectral Extended Range Optical Sight) A gimbal sight for air surveillance and targeting
- MİLGEM combat system procurement project
- MIUS/MUAS miniature UAV
- Military G.SHDSL modems
- Mobile receiver-transmitter and repeater radio equipment – MATE
- Mortar fire management system
- Multi purpose amphibious assault ship (LHD)
- MURAD AESA Radar
- Mobile air traffic control tower
- Tactical fire direction system
- PUHU electronic warfare system
- Portable radio peripherals and accessories
- POYRAZ ammunition transfer system (MTS)
- PRC V / UHF software-defined handheld radios
- REDET electronic warfare system
- Remote controlled weapon stations including Aselsan SMASH, Aselsan STOP, Aselsan STAMP, Aselsan STAMP-2, Aselsan STAMP-G
- Repeater radio and mobile repeater radio accessories
- ŞAHİN C-UAS system
- SAPAN programmable active / reactive electronic mixing system
- Serçe miniature UAV
- TASMUS tactical field communication system
- TOLUN Precision-guided munition
  - TOLUN-L INS/GNSS/SAL Guided All-Up Round Munition
  - TOLUN-EW Guided Full-Round Munition With An Electronic Warfare Payload
  - TOLUN-F INS/GNSS Guided All-Up Round Munition
  - TOLUN-IIR INS/GNSS/IIR Guided All-Up Round
  - TOLUN-P GPS/INS Guided Munition
  - TOLUN-S Ground-Launched All-Up Round Munition
- TUFAN Kamikaze Unmanned Surface Vehicle
- TURKUAZ seismic research ship scientific mission system
- Vehicle radio peripherals and accessories
- VRC-9661 in-vehicle remote control system
- VURAL electronic warfare system
- UKAP unmanned ground vehicle
- ZAMBAK helmet Set Units
- ZARGANA torpedo countermeasure system for submarines

== See also ==
- Defense industry of Turkey
