= High to medium air defense =

Anti-air weapons against high to medium altitude targets

High to medium air defense (HIMAD) is a group of anti-aircraft weapons and tactics to do with defense against high to medium altitude air threats, primarily aircraft and missiles. HIMAD and its complements, short range air defense (SHORAD) and Terminal High Altitude Area Defense (THAAD), divide air defense of the battlespace into domes of responsibility based on altitude and defensive weapon ranges.

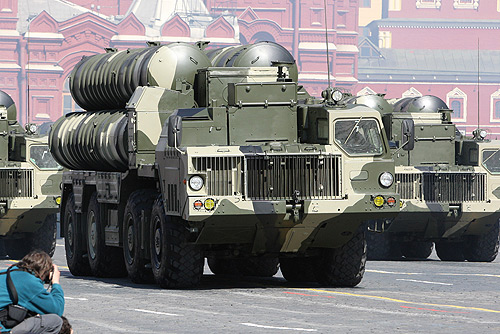
Russian S-300 missile in a parade

== China ==
- HQ-9
- HQ-22

== France / Italy ==
- SAMP/T

== Germany ==
- IRIS-T SLM

== India ==
- Barak-8 (co-developed with Israel)
- Project Kusha

== Iran ==
- Bavar-373

== Israel ==
- Barak-8 (co-developed with India)

== Russia ==
Russian systems include:

- S-300
- S-400
- S-500

== South Korea ==
- M-SAM
- L-SAM Block 1

== Turkey ==
- Hisar (missile family)
- SİPER

== United States ==
United States Army systems include:

- MIM-23 Hawk
- MIM-104 Patriot
