= Microwave power module =

A microwave power module (MPM) is a microwave device used to amplify radio frequency signals to high power levels. It is a hybrid combination of solid-state and vacuum tube electronics, which encloses a solid-state power amplifier (SSPA), traveling wave tube amplifier (TWTA) and electronic power conditioning (EPC) modules into a single unit. Their average output power capability falls between that of solid-state power amplifiers (SSPAs) and dedicated Traveling Wave Tube (TWT) amplifiers. They may be applied wherever high power microwave amplification is required, and space is at a premium. They are available in various frequency ranges, from S band up to W band. Typical output power at K_{u} band ranges from 20W to 1 kW.

== History ==
The microwave power module concept was designed for use in active phased array antennas, where their compact size permits packing a large number of modules into the radiating face of the antenna. The concept was explored in detail by the 1989 Microwave Power Module Panel, supported by the US Naval Research Laboratory. While the eventual goal was to design a power module with a cross section as small as a half square inch, most MPMs today are larger, and suitable only for line arrays, partially distributed arrays and single-module applications.

== Typical specifications ==
Microwave power modules are available at various frequencies, from S band up to W band. Both CW and pulsed MPMs are available, the pulsed MPMs having a wide duty cycle range. Power levels range from less than 20W to over 1 kW. MPMs are light-weight compared to traditional TWTAs, and the power supply requirements are typically low-voltage DC (28–270 volts DC).

== Construction ==
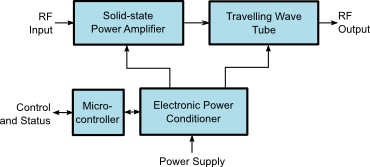
Block diagram of an MPM

A microwave power module consists of a solid state power amplifier, which drives a vacuum power booster, typically a traveling wave tube. The high voltage power supply required by the TWT is provided by an electronic power conditioner. In pulsed-mode MPMs, the power conditioner provides a pulsed high voltage that is triggered by a trigger input. MPMs also include a microcontroller, which is responsible for controlling the operation of the module, such as making sure the various power supply voltages come up in the appropriate sequence to prevent damage to the TWT. It also reports the module status, including the various voltages, currents and temperatures.

== Applications ==
Microwave power modules are used in

- Active phased array antennas
- Radar transmitters where relatively low power, but long pulse widths are needed (such as Synthetic Aperture Radars)
- Commercial and military satellite communications

== See also ==
- Traveling-wave tube
- Microwaves
- Klystron – A device for amplifying or generating microwaves (with greater precision and control than is available from a magnetron)
