= KORKUT =

Turkish anti-aircraft gun

- Type: Self-propelled anti-aircraft gun
- Place of origin: Turkey

Service history
- In service: 2016 – present
- Used by: Turkey; Pakistan
- Wars: Second Libyan Civil War: Turkish military intervention

Production history
- Designer: ASELSAN
- Manufacturer: Aselsan and FNSS
- No. built: 13 systems
- Variants: Aselsan GOKDENIZ

Specifications
- Length: 7 m (23 ft)
- Width: 3.9 m (13 ft)
- Height: 2.2 m (7.2 ft)
- Caliber: 35 mm (1.38in)
- Traverse: 360°
- Rate of fire: 1,100 rpm
- Maximum firing range: 4 km
- Main armament: 35 mm dual-barrelled autocannon (with 400 rounds)
- Secondary armament: Stinger or Igla-S MANPADS
- Maximum speed: 65 km/h (road)

The KORKUT is a Turkish all-weather-capable 35 mm self-propelled anti-aircraft gun (SPAAG) developed by Aselsan.

Designed to replace the aging M42A1 Duster systems of the Turkish Armed Forces, each Korkut system comprises one command and control vehicle and three weapons platforms. Each weapon platform carries a twin 2×35 mm Oerlikon KDC-02 cannon, manufactured under licence by MKEK. Each weapons system can fire up to 1,100 rounds a minute up to a range of 4 km. The command and control vehicle has an effective radar range of 70 km. The Weapon System Vehicle and Command-and-Control Vehicle configurations designed under the Korkut Project are based on the FNSS ACV-30 and is fully amphibious and have the capability of propelling themselves in deep water and rivers.

The Turkish Armed Forces has ordered 40 weapons systems, deliveries are scheduled to complete in 2022.

== Ammunition ==
The cannons can fire different types of 35×228 mm ammunitions including Aselsan made ATOM 35mm airburst ammunition.

ATOM 35mm airburst ammunition ejects tungsten pellets at a predetermined distance. It is a smart ammunition which has a base fuse. Together with the ability of precise time counting and the capability of being programmed during firing by taking muzzle velocity into consideration automatically sets the fuse to detonate the round as it approaches a pre-set distance from the target. Whilst a single pellet is too small to do major damage in itself, the accumulation of damage from multiple strikes is designed to destroy wings and control surfaces, sensors and aerodynamics, causing the target to crash. According to Aselsan, the ammunition is resistant against electromagnetic jamming.

In June 2025 Aselsan unveiled the KORKUT 100/25 SB, a dedicated counter-drone variant using 25mm AI-guided airburst ammunition; in January 2026 the KORKUT 140/35 successfully engaged an FPV drone in live-fire trials.

== Operators ==
=== Current ===
- Turkey: Turkish Land Forces
- Pakistan: Pakistan Air Force
- Ukraine: Armed Forces of Ukraine

=== Future ===
- Czech Republic
