= Aselsan Albatros-S =

Turkish unmanned combat surface vessel

Albatros-S
Class overview
- Name: Albatros-S
- Builders: Aselsan
- Operators: Turkish Navy

General characteristics Albatros-S
- Type: Unmanned surface vehicle
- Length: 7.20 m (23.6 ft)
- Beam: 2 m (6 ft 7 in)
- Speed: 40 kn (74 km/h; 46 mph)
- Range: 200 nmi (370 km; 230 mi)

Albatros-S is a Turkish unmanned surface vessel (USV) swarm of the Turkish Navy developed by the Turkish defense company Aselsan.

== History ==
The USV Albatros-S (Turkish: Albatros-S İnsansız Deniz Aracı, Albatros-S İDA) was developed by the Turkish state-owned defense company Aselsan for the needs of the Turkish Naval Forces. The USV can attack targets in swarm of eight.

In October 2023, a test firing was carried out off Mersin coast in the Mediterranean Sea, at which the target was destroyed when the explosive of Roketsan contained in the USV hit the target on the sea at a high speed and detonated, in the role of a suicide attack (Kamikaze) craft.

== Characteristics ==
Albatros-S is an unmanned marine vehicle swarm system that has a high level of autonomy and can navigate and perform tasks in a swarm formation independent of central control. She can operate in reconnaissance and surveillance, engaging the Target with single or multiple crafts, coast guard patrol and assault, base/port defense.

She features autonomous navigation, task ability to perform solo or swarm, avoiding Fixed and moving obstacles and new route creating, high ppeed and maneuverability, low radar and infrared cross section, navigational radar, anti–jam GNSS System.

She is 7.20 m (23.6 ft) long, and has a beam of 2 m (6 ft 7 in). She weighs 1,955 kg (4,310 lb) and is capable of carrying 250 kg (550 lb) payload. She can cruise at a speed of 40 kn (74 km/h; 46 mph) within a range of 200 nmi (370 km; 230 mi) in total operation time of 10 hours.

She features network radio frequency communication system, narrow-bandwidth satellite communication system and 4.5 G/LTE Communication System.

== See also ==
- Aselsan Albatros USV family
- Aselsan Albatros-K, catamaran-type seaborne target craft
