= Kalkan (radar) =

Turkish radar system

Kalkan (Turkish for "shield") is a phased array 3D search and track radar system for low and medium range air defense mission operations.

It is designed and manufactured by Aselsan, a Turkish corporation that produces electronic systems for the Turkish Armed Forces.

Kalkan is currently the main radar of the Turkish Armed Forces' mobile Air Defense Early Warning and Command Control System (HERİKKS) and Medium Altitude Air Defense Missile System Hisar, entering into service in 2008. ASELSAN introduced to the market a new version of the radar, KALKAN-II, and exhibited at International Defence Industry Fair (IDEF) 2017.

As part of the Next Generation Air Defense Early Warning Radar (KALKAN-II) Procurement Agreement signed between the Ministry of National Defense and ASELSAN in 2016, the acceptance of a total of 11 systems has been completed. The three dimensional radar systems are used as the main search radar of the Turkish Land Forces Command Air Defense Early Warning Command Control System (HERIKKS) and the Medium-Altitude Air Defense missile system (Hisar-O).

== Description ==
Kalkan-II is a mobile X band phased array 3D search and track radar for point and area defense of critical military and civilian assets. KALKAN-II offers an instrumented range of 120 km and can track multiple targets accurately, adding classification and identification information to each target track.

Applications

- Point and area air defense of critical assets
- Integration to Air Defense Missile Systems & Command Control Systems or a radar sensor in self-operating mode

Features

- 3D Detection and Tracking Fighters, Helicopters, Hovering Helicopters, Unmanned Air Vehicles (UAVs), Cruise Missiles
- Multiple target tracking
- Classification of targets
- Identification of targets with integrated Mode 5 IFF
- Jammer direction finding
- Remote operation with Command Control System
- Transportable with its own tactical truck having power and communication subsystems

Technical Specifications

- Operating Frequency : X-Band
- Instrumented Range : 100 / ≥ 120 km
- Target Track Capacity : >60
- Azimuth Coverage : 360°
- Elevation Coverage : -10° / +55°

== Operators ==
- Turkey
