= KORAL electronic warfare system =

KORAL
- Type: Electronic warfare system
- Place of origin: Turkey

Service history
- In service: 2015 - present
- Used by: See Operators
- Wars: Syrian civil war Libyan civil war 2020 Nagorno-Karabakh conflict

Production history
- Designer: ASELSAN
- Manufacturer: ASELSAN

KORAL is a land-based transportable electronic warfare system developed to jam and deceive hostile radars of enemy nations.

It is designed and manufactured by ASELSAN, a Turkish corporation that produces electronic systems for the Turkish Armed Forces. It was developed under the Land Based Stand-off Jammer System project which started in 2009.

KORAL System supports the Suppression of Enemy Air Defenses (SEAD) operations by building information dominance and providing fast response time in a challenging environment. KORAL is composed of an Electronic Support and an Electronic Attack System each mounted on an 8×8 tactical truck. The Operation Control Unit (OCU) is in compliance with NATO standards and also supports NBC (nuclear, biological, chemical) protection.

== Features ==
- One operational unit includes four Koral Electronic Support Systems (ED) and one Electronic Attack System (ET), each mounted on an 8x8 truck.
- Can search, intercept, analyse, classify, and locate the direction of multiple conventional and complex types of radar signals.
- Ability to jam, deceive, and paralyse hostile radars.
- Operating range of 200 km.

== Operational history ==
=== Syria ===
Professor Fahrettin Altun, the director of communications for the Turkish presidency, confirmed that the Aselsan Koral electronic warfare system played an important role in Operation Spring Shield in 2020. Some experts stated that the Koral system created ghost areas on Syrian and Russian radars, blinding them and making them ineffective against Turkish drone attacks.

=== Libya ===
On 4 July 2020, Libyan National Army affiliated fighter jets attacked Al-Watiya Air Base in western Libya. LNA forces airstrikes destroyed Government of National Accord (GNA) defenses including MIM-23 Hawk, and claimed a KORAL Electronic Warfare System destroyed. stationed in the base. Turkish officials stated that the attack could have been perpetrated by UAE Air Force Dassault Mirage aircraft. Russian military sources added that the attack was carried out by Dassault Mirage 2000 aircraft.

== Operators ==
- Turkey- 5 units received by the Turkish Air Force and deployed on the Turkish-Syrian Border in 2016
- Morocco - Aselsan signed an agreement with Morocco to deliver unknown quantity of Koral EW systems.

== See also ==
- VURAL electronic warfare system
