= ATILGAN PMSS =

- Type: Self-propelled anti-aircraft weapon Mobile air defense missile system Surface to air missile
- Place of origin: Turkey

Service history
- In service: 2001–present
- Used by: Turkish Armed Forces; Turkish Naval Forces

Production history
- Manufacturer: ROKETSAN and ASELSAN
- Produced: 2001–present
- No. built: 100+

Specifications
- Mass: 15.3 t (33,731 lb)
- Length: 4.863 m (16.0 ft)
- Width: 3.686 m (12.1 ft)
- Height: 2.5 m (8 ft 2.4 in)
- Crew: 2 (Basic), 3 (STC)
- Main armament: 4 or 8 FIM-92 Stinger missiles
- Secondary armament: 1x 12.7 mm (0.500 in) automatic machine gun
- Engine: Detroit Diesel 6V53T, 6-cylinder diesel engine 205 kW (275 hp)
- Payload capacity: 8 ready-to-fire Stinger missiles
- Suspension: torsion bar, 5 road wheels
- Operational range: 8km
- Maximum speed: 67.6 km/h (36.5 kn; 42.0 mph) on land 5.8 km/h (3.1 kn; 3.6 mph) swimming

The ATILGAN Pedestal Mounted Air Defense System, designated ATILGAN PMAD is a Turkish self-propelled surface-to-air missile system which provides mobile, short-range air defense protection for ground units against cruise missiles, unmanned aerial vehicles, low-flying fixed-wing aircraft, helicopters. and for every short range air defense.

The ATILGAN was originally developed for the Turkish Armed Forces and is currently used by the Turkish Land Forces. The ATILGAN system was also used by the Turkish Naval Forces.

== History ==
The ATILGAN Pedestal Mounted Air Defense System, was developed over a period of 12 years. PMAD project, which started needs analysis and conceptual design in 1989; Following the feasibility, configuration determination and development studies, it was launched with a serial production contract signed in 2001. PMAD Systems, which have undergone challenging tests and field trials within the scope of prototype development period and serial production line qualification approval, has achieved great success in all the shots made until today. The PMAD system eliminated two German companies in the tender opened in 2005 and in addition became the choice of the Dutch army. PMAD System was launched in two different configurations, ATILGAN and ZIPKIN.

Serial production is still continuing by Aselsan and Roketsan companies. There are 100+ systems in the Turkish Land Forces inventory.

== Overview ==
The ATILGAN Pedestal Mounted Air Defense System air defense turret mounted on a modified heavy armored/tracked M113A2 vehicle. The turret has two Stinger missile launcher pods, each capable of firing up to 4 fire-and-forget infrared/ultraviolet guided missiles in rapid succession. It is operated with a three-man crew the driver, the gunner and the commander. The main mission of Low Level Air Defense System ATILGAN, is the low level air defense of stationary and moving forward troops, convoys and tactical bases in the battlefield.

== General features ==
- Short Reaction Time.
- High Hit Capability.
- Coordinated use with the Command and Control System.
- 8 km Range.
- 3 crew.
- Fire on-the-move capability.
- 8 ready-to-fire Stinger missiles.
- Integrated 12.7 mm (0.500 in) automatic machine gun despite self-protection and near air threats.
- Passive target search and tracking sensors, consisting of thermal and daylight TV cameras.
- Multi-pulse Laser Range Finder for target distance measurement.
- Two-axis stabilized turret providing target search, diagnostic tracking and shooting target on the move.
- Firing Control Computer that provides automation of all system functions.
- Target identification by IFF providing friendly / unknown distinction for the target.
- Operable under all weather conditions.
- Detachable operating panel for remote operation up to 50 m (164 ft).
- Can be mounted on different carrier platforms, high speed, light and modular turret.
