= Aselsan Ejderha/AD 200 =

Anti-drone weapon of Turkey

Ejderha/AD 200 (literally: Dragon) is a directed-energy weapon (DEW) developed by the Turkish state-owned defense company Aselsan. It neutralizes targets by emitting high-power electromagnetic waves by damaging the target's electronic circuits and rendering them dysfunctional.

== History ==
The Ejderha/AD 200, a High-Power Electromagnetic (HPEM) Countermeasure System, developed by Aselsan to offer an effective solution against the drone threat. Its targets are micro and mini UAVs. It was introduced end July 2025.

In January 2026, Ejderha/AD 200 was tested in four different attack scenarios at the Gölbek Technology Base of Aselsan. The drones were successfully damaged from hundreds of meters away. In the first scenario, multiple drone threat simulated by three wired FPW drones were simultaneously eliminated within seconds after the system was activated. In the second scenario, a wired and a wireless FPV drone were neutralized. The systen was also effective against the engine, wings and the servomotor of the Mugin UAV.
