= ALP 300-G =

Turkish air defense radar system

- Country of origin: Turkey
- Type: Early warning radar AESA
- Frequency: S band

ALP 300-G is a GaN based long range early warning active electronically scanned array air defense radars developed by the Turkish defense corporation, Aselsan. ALP 300-G, Turkey's longest-range radar, was delivered to the Turkish Air Force with a ceremony on 20 May 2024.

== Design and development ==
ALP 300-G was designed as an early warning radar system. The ALP 300-G radar has the ability to receive over 4 thousand transmissions. Aselsan CEO said in a statement that "the radar system can make nearly 500 digital communications and has the ability to process the content of 81 DVDs per second. More than 435 thousand lines of code were used in the radar. We have nearly 20 patents in the development of this radar. Our AL 300-G Mobile Radar can also be installed in 30 minutes. It provides uninterrupted communication by sending radio links to remote access."

The Turkish Ministry of Defense ordered the ALP 300-G radar worth $225 million from Aselsan in December 2024. Deliveries are planned to be made between 2026 and 2031. On 27 August 2025, at a ceremony attended by President Erdoğan, air defense systems worth approximately $460 million, including the ALP 300-G and ALP 100-G, were delivered to the Turkish Armed Forces.

== See also ==
- ALP 100-G - Low altitude version
- Aselsan EIRS - Similar feature version
