= Aselsan EIRS =

Turkish long range radar system

Aselsan EIRS (Turkish: ERALP) (Early Warning RADAR System) is a new generation S-Band radar, developed for long range early warning purposes, with AESA and digital beamforming antenna architecture. The system developed by Turkish company Aselsan. In addition to air-breathing air targets, EIRS also has the ability to detect and track Ballistic Missiles and targets with stealth technology / low RKA from long range.

Thanks to its EIRS, AESA and digital beamforming architecture and its multi-channel receiver structure, it has the ability to create more than one beam at the same time. EIRS has the feature of using meteorological data in order to increase its detection and tracking performance.

The radar, communication / command control and power subsystems that make up the EIRS are carried on tactical vehicles. For this reason, EİRS, which has high mobility, does not require any disassembly and assembly for installation and assembly. By connecting to existing radar networks, EİRS can share messages in AWCIES format, 3D aerial image with other systems and Control Notification Centers via radio or radio links.

EIRS has the ability to fuse data with other EIRSs and transfer trace information to transfer targets, which are critical for ballistic missile defense. The long range Mode 5 IFF interrogator is integrated with a high gain IFF antenna to support the operational modes of the radar. EIRS's AESA architecture and modular design approach support the concepts of low cost maintenance and high availability.

EIRS has electronic protection features such as wide frequency band frequency and time mobility, side beam dimming, and low side beam levels.

Systems to be Procured

- Portable Early Warning Radar System (TEIRS): 4
- Fixed Early Warning Radar System (SEIRS): 18 units

Some of these radars will replace older radars.

Others will be deployed in areas with low altitude vulnerability due to rugged geography, depending on the need for radar coverage.

In this context, ASELSAN; It works on two different long-range air surveillance and early warning radars with a rotating and fixed (9o sector angle) antenna using Active Phased Array Antenna technology.

General Features

Weather elements it can detect:

- Air-to-air missiles
- Air-ground missiles
- Low altitude cruise missiles
- Anti radiation missiles
- Low face and low cross section UAVs
- Helicopters
- Airplanes
- Tactical, short, medium range ballistic missiles
- Other
- Maximum detection range:
- Number of targets that can be tracked at the same time: 200-300
- Broadcast frequency: S Band
- Antenna: Active phased array
- 3-dimensional target search, detection and tracking (coordinates and altitude)
- Automatic target classification
- IFF (Friend / foe identification) inquiry
- Separate beams for searching and tracking
- Integration to control reporting centers
- Electronic warfare resistance
- Compliance with air and missile defense systems
- Reducing the reaction time by directly transferring target information to weapon systems
- Ability to work in all weather conditions and day / night
- Ability to eliminate false target echoes that wind power plants can create

TEIRS Features

The system consists of the following subsystems that can be transported on 10-ton class vehicles:

- Radar subsystem tool
- Command control vehicle
- Radio link subsystem tool
- Generator tool
- Local control from the command control vehicle or remotely from the command control center
- Transportable with C130 or A400M
- Setup and assembly time in 30 minutes

Commissioning Date.

- .

== See also ==
- SİPER - Air defense system using EIRS
- ALP 300-G - Standalone version of EIRS
