= ALP 100-G =

Air defense radar system

- Country of origin: Turkey
- Type: Early warning radar AESA
- Frequency: S band

ALP 100-G is a GaN based multifunction low altitude early warning active electronically scanned array air defense radars developed by Aselsan. A radar capable of 3D detection and tracking of fighter jets, helicopters, unmanned aerial vehicles (UAVs) and cruise missiles is in the development phase.

ALP 100-G can shows the firing and falling points of enemy elements with its "special weapon detection mode". The first Alp 100-G was delivered to the Turkish Armed Forces on 8 April 2025. On 27 August 2025, at a ceremony attended by President Erdoğan, air defense systems worth approximately $460 million, including the ALP 300-G and ALP 100-G, were delivered to the Turkish Armed Forces.

In 2026, Turkey delivered ALP-100G in Somalia

== See also ==
- ALP 300-G - Long Range version
