= VURAL =

VURAL EW System
- Type: Electronic warfare system
- Place of origin: Turkey

Service history
- In service: 2019 - present
- Used by: Turkey
- Wars: Syrian civil war

Production history
- Designer: Aselsan
- Manufacturer: Aselsan
- Produced: 2021 - present

VURAL (REDET-II) is a land-based transportable electronic warfare system developed to paralyze enemy communications and block radio frequencies by performing high-power jamming in a wide band.

== Operational history ==
In March 2025, the Greek Cypriot news site Simerini published a report stating that the Aselsan VURAL and Aselsan STR-700 G Weapon Detection Radar placed in the Beşparmak Mountains paralyzed the radar and communication systems of the Cypriot forces on the island, rendering them ineffective.
