= Defence Industry Agency =

Turkish civil institution

- Savunma Sanayii Başkanlığı

Agency overview
- Formed: 7 November 1985; 40 years ago
- Employees: 552 (as of January 2016)
- Annual budget: ₺100,839,000 (2020)
- Agency executive: Haluk Görgün, President
- Parent department: Office of the President of Turkey
- Parent agency: Ministry of National Defense
- Website: www.ssb.gov.tr
- Agency ID: SSB

In Turkey, Defence Industry Agency (Turkish: Savunma Sanayii Başkanlığı (SSB)); formerly Presidency of Defence Industries and Undersecretariat for Defence Industries (SSM) before that, is a civil institution established by the government to manage the defence industry of Turkey and the supply of military technology. It was established under Law No. 3238 on 7 November 1985 under the name of "Defence Industry Development and Support Administration Office".

The Presidency has close relations with the Office of the President of Turkey, the Ministry of National Defence and the Turkish Armed Forces, as well as domestic and foreign defence industry companies. In addition to supporting projects and products based on domestic design and production, SSB gives importance to technological transfer of products and services acquired from foreign suppliers.

On 10 July 2018, it became affiliated with the Office of the President with the Presidential Decree No. 1 and its name was changed to "Presidency of Defence Industries".

On 14 December 2020, the United States Department of State issued sanctions against the Turkish Defense Industry including "prohibition on granting specific U.S. export licenses and authorizations for any goods or technology transferred to SSB".

On 16 May 2022, the agency has updated their logo and changed its English name to Defence Industry Agency from Presidency of Defence Industries; however the original Turkish name -Savunma Sanayii Başkanlığı- has been left untouched. At the same date, a new logo has been introduced to be more integrated with other agencies and presidencies of Turkey.

== Departments ==
- Personnel and Education Department
- Strategy Development Department
- Procurement Management Department
- Administrative and Financial Affairs Department
- Department of Industrialization
- R&D and Technology Management Department
- Quality-Testing and Certification Department
- International Cooperation Department
- Land Vehicles Department
- Marine Vehicles Department
- Department of Aircraft
- Helicopter Department
- Communications Electronics and Information Systems Department
- Space Department
- Weapon Systems Department
- Electronic Warfare and Radar Systems Department
- Unmanned and Intelligent Systems Department

== List of presidents ==
No.	Name	Tenure started	Tenure ended
1	Vahit Erdem	23 December 1985	19 July 1993
2	Yalçın Burçak	19 July 1993	31 January 2000
3	Prof. Dr. Dursun Ali Ercan	31 January 2000	6 February 2004
4	Murad Bayar	6 February 2004	28 March 2014
5	Faruk Özlü (acting)	30 March 2014	11 April 2014
6	Prof. Dr. İsmail Demir	11 April 2014	5 Jun 2023
7	Prof. Dr. Haluk Görgün	5 Jun 2023	Incumbent

== See also ==
- National Security Council
- Agency for Defense Development - South Korea
- Defense Advanced Research Projects Agency - United States
- Defence Research and Development Organisation - India
- Defence Technology Institute - Thailand
- Military Institute of Armament Technology - Poland
- National Chung-Shan Institute of Science and Technology - Taiwan
- Rafael Advanced Defense Systems - Israel
- Swedish Defence Research Agency - Sweden
