= TÜBİTAK Defense Industries Research and Development Institute =

Turkish defence research institution

- TÜBİTAK Savunma Sanayii Araştırma ve Geliştirme Enstitüsü
- Abbreviation: TÜBİTAK SAGE
- Formation: 1972
- Type: GO
- Purpose: Defense industry technology
- Headquarters: Lalahan, Elmadağ
- Location: Ankara, Turkey
- Products: Missiles, cruise missiles, bombs, bomb guidance kits, multiple rocket launchers
- Parent organization: Scientific and Technological Research Council of Turkey (TÜBİTAK)
- Website: www.sage.tubitak.gov.tr
- Formerly called: 1972-83 Guided Vehicles Technology and Measurement Center (Güdümlü Araçlar Teknoloji ve Ölçüm Merkezi, GATÖM); 1983-88 Ballistics Research Institute (Balistik Araştırma Enstitüsü, BAE)

TÜBİTAK Defense Industries Research and Development Institute (Turkish: TÜBİTAK Savunma Sanayii Araştırma ve Geliştirme Enstitüsü), shortly TÜBİTAK SAGE, is a Turkish institution carrying out research and development projects on defense industry technology.

It was established in 1972 at Beşevler neighborhood in central Ankara under the name "Guided Vehicles Technology and Measurement Center" (Güdümlü Araçlar Teknoloji ve Ölçüm Merkezi, GATÖM) by the Scientific and Technological Research Council of Turkey (Turkish: Türkiye Bilimsel ve Teknolojik Araştırma Kurumu, TÜBİTAK). In 1983, the institution was renamed to "Ballistics Research Institute" (Balistik Araştırma Enstitüsü, BAE), and finally in 1988 it took its current name. The organization conducts research and development activities to meet the needs of the Turkish Armed Forces and national defense industry.

SAGE moved in 1993 to its new location in Lalahan village of Elmadağ district, 30 km (19 mi) northeast of Ankara. The facility in Beşevler serves as Ankara Wind Tunnel. The institute also runs a site within the Middle East Technical University (ODTÜ).

== Projects ==
=== SOM and SOM-J Cruise Missiles ===
The SOM ; English: Stand-Off Munition) is a family of Turkish indigenous air-launched cruise missiles developed by TÜBİTAK SAGE for precision strike missions against heavily defended land and naval targets.

The SOM family was developed for compatibility with multiple Turkish Air Force platforms including the F-4E/2020, F-16 Fighting Falcon, Bayraktar AKINCI UCAV and the KAAN fifth-generation fighter aircraft.

Variants of the SOM family include:

- SOM-A – baseline land-attack cruise missile variant equipped with GPS/INS guidance and terrain-referenced navigation systems.
- SOM-B1 – improved variant featuring an imaging infrared seeker and enhanced terminal guidance capability.
- SOM-B2 – bunker-buster variant equipped with a tandem penetrator warhead optimized for hardened and fortified targets.
- SOM-J – a compact low-observable cruise missile optimized for internal carriage by fifth-generation fighter aircraft and capable of engaging both land and naval targets.

SOM-J was originally developed for integration with the F-35 Lightning II weapons bay but was later adapted for Turkish indigenous platforms including the KAAN fighter aircraft and Bayraktar AKINCI unmanned combat aerial vehicle.

The SOM missile family is produced by ROKETSAN following technology transfer from TÜBİTAK SAGE.

=== Guidance Kits ===
TÜBİTAK SAGE develops a family of indigenous precision guidance kits designed to convert conventional unguided bombs into smart munitions for the Turkish Armed Forces.

The current guidance kit family includes:

- HGK (Precision Guidance Kit) – a GPS/INS-based precision guidance kit designed for Mk-84, Mk-83 and Mk-82 general-purpose bombs. The system provides all-weather precision strike capability and low CEP values.
- KGK (Wing-Assisted Guidance Kit) – a wing-assisted precision guidance kit that extends the stand-off range of Mk-82 and Mk-83 bombs to over 100 km depending on release conditions.
- GÖZDE – a new-generation precision guidance kit equipped with laser seeker capability for engaging moving and stationary targets with high precision.
- GÖKÇE – a new-generation guidance kit developed for precision engagement of moving and fixed targets, featuring advanced seeker and navigation technologies.

The guidance kit family has been integrated with Turkish Air Force platforms including the F-16 and other indigenous combat aircraft projects.

=== Artillery Rocket Systems ===
TÜBİTAK SAGE develops indigenous artillery rocket systems and guided rocket munitions intended for precision strike missions against tactical and operational targets.

The current artillery rocket systems developed by TÜBİTAK SAGE include:

- K+ – a precision-guided artillery rocket system developed to increase the accuracy and effectiveness of conventional rocket artillery platforms through advanced guidance and navigation technologies.
- GÖKBORA – a long-range ballistic and precision strike missile project developed for strategic deep-strike missions against high-value targets.

The artillery rocket systems developed by TÜBİTAK SAGE utilize indigenous guidance, navigation and control technologies designed to improve strike precision and operational effectiveness.

GÖKBORA was publicly revealed as part of Türkiye's expanding indigenous long-range missile and strategic strike capability initiatives.

Thermal battery

NEB bunker buster

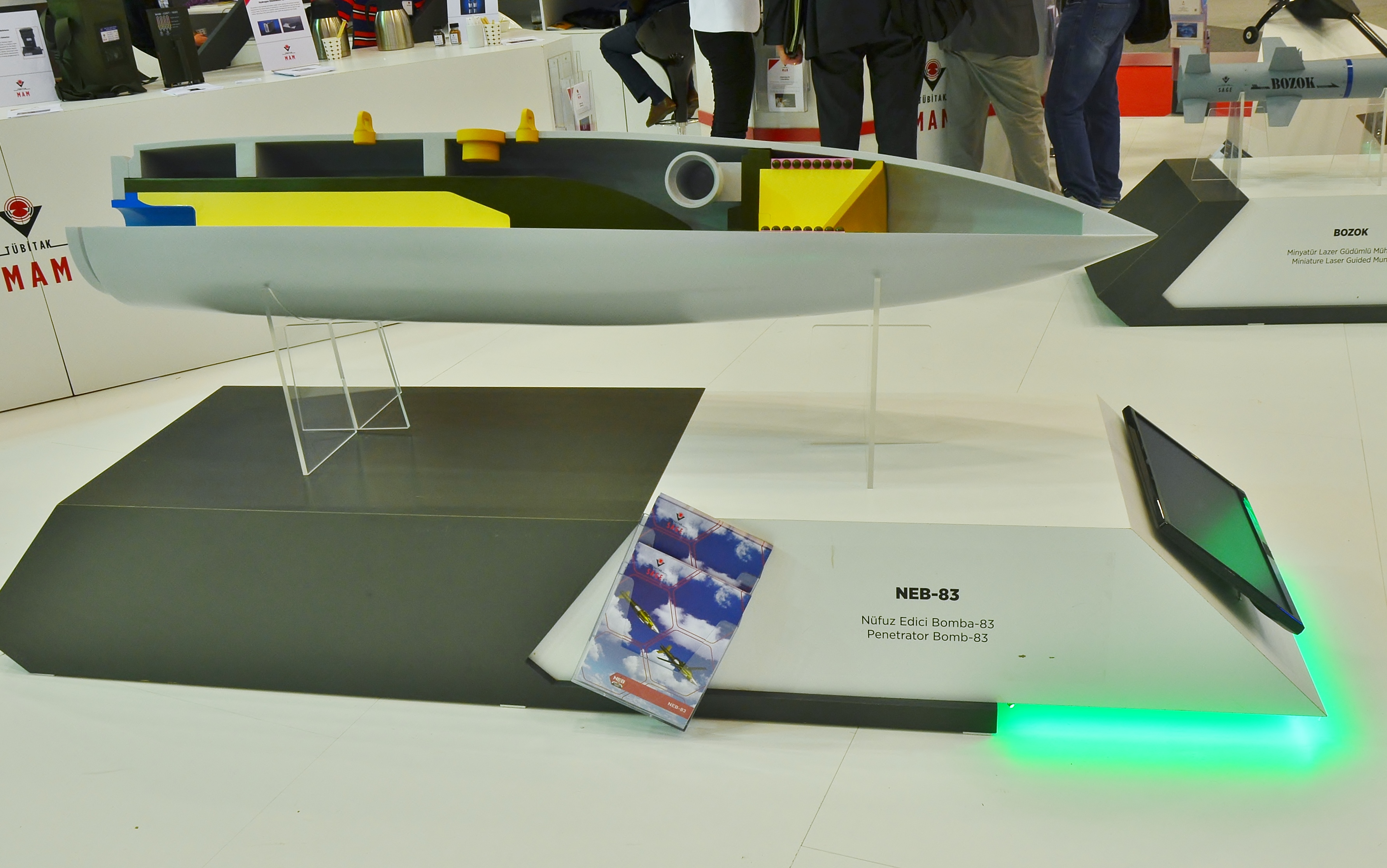
Penetrator bomb NEB-83 at thestand of ROKETSAN during the IDEF 2015.

The NEB Bunker Buster (Turkish: Nüfuz Edici Bomba, NEB) is a bomb able to destroy the reinforced concrete fixed and buried targets by penetrating to them with desired time delay. It is compatible with HGK and GBU-10 Paveway II.

=== UAV Munitions ===
TÜBİTAK SAGE develops a family of indigenous smart munitions optimized for unmanned aerial vehicles (UAVs) and unmanned combat aerial vehicles (UCAVs). These lightweight precision-guided weapons are designed for tactical strike missions against stationary and moving targets.

The current UAV munition family includes:

- BOZOK – a laser-guided miniature munition developed for UAV platforms, featuring semi-active laser seeker guidance and high-precision strike capability against stationary and moving targets.
- TOGAN – a rotary-wing loitering munition and reconnaissance UAV system capable of autonomous surveillance and precision attack missions.
- KUZGUN – a modular smart munition family developed in multiple variants including guided bombs and cruise missile configurations for UAV and manned aircraft integration.
- KEMANKEŞ – a miniature intelligent cruise missile and loitering munition system designed for long-endurance precision strike missions from unmanned aerial platforms.

The UAV munition family has been developed for integration with Turkish unmanned aerial platforms including the Bayraktar TB2, Bayraktar AKINCI, Bayraktar KIZILELMA and TAI ANKA series.

=== Air Defense Missiles ===
TÜBİTAK SAGE develops indigenous air defense missile systems and munitions for the Turkish multi-layered air defense architecture known as the Steel Dome (Turkish: Çelik Kubbe).

The current air defense systems and munitions developed by TÜBİTAK SAGE include:

- SİPER – a long-range surface-to-air missile system developed jointly with ASELSAN and ROKETSAN for strategic air and missile defense missions.
- GÖKDEMİR – a mobile air defense missile system developed as a component of the Steel Dome architecture. The system utilizes derivatives of the GÖKDOĞAN air-to-air missile adapted for ground-based air defense missions.
- GÖKSUR – a close-in naval air defense missile system jointly developed by TÜBİTAK SAGE and ASELSAN to protect naval platforms against anti-ship missiles and other low-altitude aerial threats.

The GÖKSUR missile features:

  - 360-degree engagement capability
  - Imaging infrared (IIR) seeker with next-generation imaging capability
  - Multiple target interception capability
  - Vertical and angled launch capability
  - Folding fin structure
  - Fragmentation warhead
  - Mid-course guidance via datalink.
- PARM – a programmable 35 mm airburst ammunition developed for close-in air defense systems against unmanned aerial vehicles, helicopters, cruise missiles and low-altitude aerial threats.

TÜBİTAK SAGE air defense projects are developed in cooperation with Turkish defense companies including ASELSAN and ROKETSAN as part of Türkiye's indigenous integrated air defense ecosystem.

=== Shelter Penetrator Munitions ===
TÜBİTAK SAGE develops indigenous shelter penetrator and bunker-buster munitions designed to defeat hardened, reinforced and underground targets.

The current shelter penetrator munition family includes:

- NEB (Turkish: Nüfuz Edici Bomba; English: Penetrating Bomb) – a bunker-buster munition developed for destroying hardened underground structures, shelters and reinforced strategic targets. The weapon was developed with enhanced penetration and delayed fuze capabilities.
- SARB-83 – a penetration bomb developed against hardened shelters and fortified targets using Mk-83 class warheads and advanced fuze technologies.
- SERT-82 – a hardened target penetrator munition based on the Mk-82 bomb class, developed for precision attacks against reinforced structures and field fortifications.

The NEB penetrator bomb attracted international attention after Turkish officials stated that it had successfully penetrated several meters of reinforced concrete during qualification testing.

Shelter penetrator munitions developed by TÜBİTAK SAGE are integrated with Turkish Air Force combat aircraft and precision guidance kits including HGK and KGK series.

=== Thermobaric Bombs ===
TÜBİTAK SAGE develops indigenous thermobaric explosives and aerial bomb systems designed to generate enhanced blast pressure and thermal effects against enclosed, fortified and underground targets.

The current thermobaric munition family includes:

- NEB-T – a thermobaric variant of the NEB penetrator bomb developed for enhanced blast and thermal effects against underground facilities, tunnels and fortified structures.
- VOLKAN – a powder-based thermobaric explosive designated PBP-102, developed to increase pressure, heat and destructive effects in confined environments.
- TENDÜREK (MK82-T / PBP-003) – a thermobaric variant of the Mk-82 general-purpose bomb utilizing plastic-bonded thermobaric explosive material containing metallic powder additives for increased thermal and blast effectiveness.

According to TÜBİTAK SAGE, the TENDÜREK thermobaric bomb was designed to produce increased pressure impulse and extended thermal effects compared to conventional Mk-82 bombs, particularly against caves, bunkers, tunnels, headquarters buildings and aircraft shelters.

The TENDÜREK system is compatible with multiple precision guidance kits and bomb integration systems including HGK-82, KGK-82, LGK-82, GBU-38 and GBU-58 configurations.

Thermobaric munitions developed by TÜBİTAK SAGE are intended for use by Turkish Air Force combat aircraft and indigenous unmanned combat aerial vehicle platforms.

== Projects under development ==
=== GÖKTUĞ Air-to-Air Missile Family ===
The GÖKTUĞ is a Turkish indigenous air-to-air missile family developed by TÜBİTAK SAGE. Originally consisting of two missile variants, the program was later expanded with the addition of the ramjet-powered GÖKHAN missile.

The missile family currently consists of:

- BOZDOĞAN (Merlin) – a within-visual-range air-to-air missile (WVRAAM) equipped with an imaging infrared (IIR) seeker.
- GÖKDOĞAN (Peregrine) – a beyond-visual-range air-to-air missile (BVRAAM) equipped with an active radar seeker and datalink capability.
- GÖKHAN – a ramjet-powered beyond-visual-range air-to-air missile under development for long-range engagements and air superiority missions.

The GÖKTUĞ project was initiated to provide the Turkish Air Force with indigenous air-to-air missile systems compatible with platforms such as the F-16 and the TAI TF Kaan fighter aircraft.
