= List of Turkish Air Force aircraft =

The Turkish Air Force operates a diverse fleet of aircraft, supported by a domestic aerospace industry, such as Turkish Aerospace Industries, that has made contributions to locally produce license-built aircraft and indigenous Unmanned aerial vehicle. The following is a list of currently military aircraft in the Turkish Air Force.

== Aircraft ==
=== Current inventory ===
Aircraft	Origin	Type	Variant	In service	Notes
Combat aircraft
F-16 Fighting Falcon	United States; Turkey	Multirole	F-16C/D Block 30TM	34	Nearly all active aircraft were built under license by TAI. Block 30s are being upgraded to 'TM' standard. Block 40s and 50s have been upgraded under the PO-III and F-16 MSM/CCIP to Block 50+ standard. They will further be upgraded under F-16 Özgür program which is already being applied to Block 30s. 60 F-16Ds are used for conversion training. 1 used by SoloTürk demonstration team.
F-16 Fighting Falcon	United States; Turkey	Multirole	F-16C/DM Block 40 & 50	172	Nearly all active aircraft were built under license by TAI. Block 30s are being upgraded to 'TM' standard. Block 40s and 50s have been upgraded under the PO-III and F-16 MSM/CCIP to Block 50+ standard. They will further be upgraded under F-16 Özgür program which is already being applied to Block 30s. 60 F-16Ds are used for conversion training. 1 used by SoloTürk demonstration team.
F-16 Fighting Falcon	United States; Turkey	Multirole	F-16C/D Block 50+	29	Nearly all active aircraft were built under license by TAI. Block 30s are being upgraded to 'TM' standard. Block 40s and 50s have been upgraded under the PO-III and F-16 MSM/CCIP to Block 50+ standard. They will further be upgraded under F-16 Özgür program which is already being applied to Block 30s. 60 F-16Ds are used for conversion training. 1 used by SoloTürk demonstration team.
F-16 Fighting Falcon	United States; Turkey	Multirole	F-16C/D Block 70	40 on order	Nearly all active aircraft were built under license by TAI. Block 30s are being upgraded to 'TM' standard. Block 40s and 50s have been upgraded under the PO-III and F-16 MSM/CCIP to Block 50+ standard. They will further be upgraded under F-16 Özgür program which is already being applied to Block 30s. 60 F-16Ds are used for conversion training. 1 used by SoloTürk demonstration team.
Eurofighter Typhoon	United Kingdom; Germany; Italy; Spain	Multirole	Tranche 3A	24 on order	Full integration with domestic munitions. T3s will be upgraded to T4 standard. 20 more on option.According to the Turkish Presidency's Directorate of Communications, the agreement also includes an option for 20 additional aircraft.
Eurofighter Typhoon	United Kingdom; Germany; Italy; Spain	Multirole	Tranche 5	20 on order	Full integration with domestic munitions. T3s will be upgraded to T4 standard. 20 more on option.According to the Turkish Presidency's Directorate of Communications, the agreement also includes an option for 20 additional aircraft.
F-4 Phantom II	United States; Israel	Fighter-bomber	F-4E Terminator 2020	30	Upgraded by Israeli Military Industries 18 more in reserve.
KAAN	Turkey	Stealth Multirole	Block 10	20 on order	According to TAI executives, the company will supply limited-capacity 20 Kaan Block 10 by 2028. Total 300.
AEW&C
E-7 Peace Eagle	United States; Turkey	AEW&C	E-7T	4	Being upgraded with ASELSAN’s ARES-2A ESM/ELINT System, that replaced EL/L-8382.
Electronic warfare / Reconnaissance
CN-235	Spain; Indonesia; Turkey	Surveillance	CN-235M-100	2	1 used for reconnaissance under Treaty on Open Skies, 1 used for maritime patrol.
Global Express	Canada; Turkey	EW/SIGINT/ELINT	Hava SOJ	4 on order	Airframe modified by TUSAŞ. Mission systems of Aselsan.
Tanker
KC-135 Stratotanker	United States	Aerial refueling	KC-135R	7	Upgraded to Block 45.1
Transport
C-17 Globemaster III	United States	Strategic airlifter	Block 21	1	Leased from Qatar Emiri Air Force
A400M Atlas	European Union; Turkey	Strategic airlifter	A400M-180	10	Built in co-op with TAI
C-130 Hercules	United States	Tactical airlifter	C-130EM/BM Erciyes	17	6 C-130BM and 11 C-130EM variants. All upgraded by TAI.
C-130J Super Hercules	United States	Tactical airlifter	C-130J-30	12 on order	Former RAF Hercules C4. Being retrofitted by RAF.
CN-235	Spain; Indonesia; Turkey	Airlift/Air ambulance	CN-235M-100	41	All licensed built by TAI. One used by SoloTürk demonstration team. Three used by the Special Forces for SAR. Undergoing avionics modernization as TCAS, IFF Mode 5S, ADS-B OUT, GPS-based Navigation.
Helicopters
AS532 Cougar	France	CSAR	AL	6	License built by TAI. A contract was signed for the avionics modernization between ASELSAN, ASFAT and AIRBUS.
AS532 Cougar	France	SAR	UL	15	License built by TAI. A contract was signed for the avionics modernization between ASELSAN, ASFAT and AIRBUS.
UH-1 Iroquois	United States	Utility	UH-1H	56	Some underwent avionics modernization.
S-70 Black Hawk	United States	Utility	T-70	5	Produced under license by TAI, 1 lost in 2026
T625 Gökbey	Turkey	Utility		6	First indigenous helicopter.
Trainer aircraft
SZD-50 Puchacz	Poland	Glider	SZD-50-3 Puchacz	20	Owned by Turkish Aeronautical Association.
SF.260	Italy; Turkey	Basic trainer	SF.260D	34	Licensed built by TAI.
MFI-395 Super Mushshak	Pakistan	Basic trainer	MFI-395 IIB	52	
KT-1 Woongbi	South Korea	Advanced trainer	KT-1T	40	Licensed built by TAI.
TAI Hürkuş	Turkey	Advanced trainer	2B	55 on order	
T-38 Talon	United States	Jet trainer	T-38M	68	Upgraded under project ARI to T-38M.
CF-5A/B Freedom Fighter	Canada; Israel	Aerobatics	F-5/2000	18	Upgraded by Israeli Military Industries. Used by the Turkish Stars demonstration team
TAI Hürjet	Turkey	Advanced jet trainer	Block 1	16 on order	First indigenous jet aircraft.
UAV
Bayraktar Kızılelma	Turkey	UCAV	A	3	
TAI Anka	Turkey	UCAV	B / S	36	
Bayraktar Akinci	Turkey	UCAV	B	20	
TAI Aksungur	Turkey	UCAV		5	

== Future ==
- 6 F-35A Lightning II owned by the Turkish Air Force are stored in a hangar in the U.S.
- Undergoing negotiations for acquisition of new tanker aircraft to replace KC-135R. Possibilities are A330 MRTT+ or KC-46A.
- Possible acquisition of Bayraktar Kızılelma developed by Baykar unmanned combat aircraft in the future.
- Possible acquisition of C-390 Millennium transport aircraft in future, after it was offered by Embraer for TAF.

== Retired aircraft ==
Retired aircraft of the forces. Includes the Ottoman Aviation Squadrons inventory:

=== European & Local made ===
- AEG C.IV
- Airco DH.9
- Airspeed Oxford
- Albatros B.I
- Albatros C.I
- Albatros C.III
- Albatros C.XV
- Albatros D.III
- Albatros D.V
- Aviatik B.I
- Avro 504
- Avro Anson
- Blériot XI
- Blériot-SPAD S.51
- Bristol Beaufighter
- Bristol Beaufort
- Bristol Blenheim
- Bristol Prier monoplane
- Bristol Scout
- Breguet XIV
- Breguet XIX
- Caproni Ca.3
- Caudron C.27
- Caudron C.59
- Caudron G.3
- Caquot kite balloon
- De Havilland Mosquito
- de Havilland Dragon
- Deperdussin TT
- Dewoitine D.21
- DFW C.V
- DFW Mars
- Etrich Taube
- Fairey Battle
- Farman MF.7
- Fleet Model 1
- Fiat R.2
- Focke-Wulf Fw 44
- Focke-Wulf Fw 58
- Focke-Wulf Fw 190
- Fokker Eindecker
- Fokker D.VII
- General Aircraft Monospar
- Gotha Go 145
- Gotha WD.2
- Gotha WD.12
- Gotha WD.14
- Gotha WD.15
- Halberstadt C.V
- Halberstadt D.II
- Halberstadt D.V
- Hawker Hurricane
- Heinkel He 111
- Hanriot H.180
- Junkers A 35
- Junkers F 13
- Koolhoven F.K.49
- Letov Š-16
- LVG B.I3
- Messerschmitt Bf 109
- Miles Magister
- Miles Master
- MKEK-4
- Nieuport 17
- Nieuport 24
- Nieuport 27
- Nieuport-Delage NiD 42
- Morane-Saulnier AR
- Morane-Saulnier M.S.406
- Morane-Saulnier MoS-50
- Nuri Demirağ Nu D.36
- Parseval-Sigsfeld kite balloon
- Pfalz D.III
- Polikarpov Po-2
- Polikarpov R-5
- Potez 25
- PZL P.24
- REP Type N
- Rohrbach Ro III
- Rumpler B.I
- Rumpler C.I
- Rumpler C.IV
- Savoia-Marchetti S.59
- Short Type 184
- SPAD S.XIII
- Supermarine Southampton
- Supermarine Spitfire
- Supermarine Walrus
- THK-2
- THK-4
- THK-5
- THK-09
- Tupolev ANT-9
- Westland Lysander
- Vickers Viscount
- Voisin III

=== US-made ===
- A-26 Invader
- B-24 Liberator
- C-45 Expeditor
- C-47 Skytrain
- C-54 Skymaster
- F-84F Thunderstreak
- F-5 Freedom Fighter
- F-84 Thunderjet
- F-86 Sabre
- F-100 Super Sabre
- F-102 Delta Dagger
- F-104 Starfighter
- H-1 Cobra
- H-13 Sioux
- H-19 Chickasaw
- H-55 Osage
- H-58 Kiowa
- MQ-1 Predator
- PA-18 Super Cub
- P-40 Warhawk
- P-47 Thunderbolt
- RQ-7 Shadow
- T-6 Texan
- T-11 Kansan
- T-33 Shooting Star
- T-34 Mentor
- T-37 Tweet
- T-41 Mescalero
- Curtiss BF2C Goshawk
- Curtiss Falcon
- Curtiss Fledgling
- Curtiss-Wright CW-22
- General Atomics Gnat
- Martin B-10
- Martin B-26 Marauder
- Martin Baltimore
- Vultee V-11

== See also ==
- Satellites of Turkey
