= 1997 in aviation =

This is a list of aviation-related events from 1997.

== Events ==
- British Airways adopts a new livery which consists of a revised logo and around 20 different ethnic tailfins featuring art and designs representing many countries around the world.

=== January ===
- The United States Department of Defense brings unmanned aerial vehicles under its unified aircraft designation system, assigning them the designation "Q".
- January 1 – Aircraft of the United States, the United Kingdom, and Turkey begin Operation Northern Watch, the enforcement of a no-fly zone over northern Iraq north of the 36th parallel to protect Iraqi civilians from attack by Iraqi aircraft. The operation will continue until May 1, 2003.
- January 9 – Comair Flight 3272, an Embraer EMB 120 Brasilia, crashes nose-down in Monroe, Michigan, 18 miles (29 km) short of the runway while on approach to Detroit Metropolitan Wayne County Airport due to atmospheric icing. All 29 people on board die.

=== February ===
- February 4 – Two Israeli military Sikorsky CH-53 Sea Stallion Yas'ur 2000 helicopters collide over She'ar Yashuv, Israel, killing 73 Israel Defense Forces soldiers.

=== March ===
- Air Comet begins airline operations during the month.
- March 2 – Sailplane and sailboat designer Lars Bergstrom is killed in a crash while testing the stall characteristics of an experimental Windex 1200 home-built motorized sailplane near Sarasota, Florida.
- March 10 - A Gulf Air aeroplane goes through the wall at Abu Dhabi International Airport. The landing gear falls apart during takeoff. The plane is severely damaged but there are no fatalities.
- March 13 – The United States commences Operation Silver Wake, an operation to evacuate American and third-country citizens from Albania during unrest there. Under the overall command of the commander of the United States Sixth Fleet, Vice Admiral Charles S. Abbot, the operation involves helicopters of the United States Marine Corps 26th Marine Expeditionary Unit operating from the USS Nassau (LHA-4) Amphibious Ready Group and United States Army CH-47 Chinook helicopters based in Italy ferrying civilians from Tirana to United States Navy ships in the Adriatic Sea.
- March 14
  - U.S. Marine Corps helicopters involved in Operation Silver Wake come under fire from small arms and a shoulder-launched surface-to-air missile in Albania. The helicopters are not hit and return fire. The United States temporarily suspends evacuation operations in Albania.
  - Six Italian military helicopters evacuate about 100 people from Tirana's main football stadium. Ground fire hits one of the helicopters, but no one is injured. Sixty-nine French nationals evacuate by helicopter from Durrës and are flown to Durrës, and 16 Russian citizens evacuate by air from Tirana.
- March 17 – May 28 – Linda Finch, pilot, aviation historian, and San Antonio, Texas businesswoman, flying a restored and specially equipped 62-year-old Lockheed Model 10 Electra, recreates the 1937 Amelia Earhart flight to circumnavigate the globe solo. Her attempt is successful, taking 73 days. She touches down in Oakland, California.
- March 18 – Badly corroded after extensive service in the Congo, the tail section of Stavropolskaya Aktsionernaya Avia Flight 1023, an Antonov An-24, breaks off in mid-air during a charter flight from Stavropol, Russia, to Trabzon, Turkey. The airliner crashes in a Planet near Prigorodny, Russia, east of Cherkessk, killing all 50 people on board.
- March 26 – Operation Silver Wake comes to an end. During the 13-day operation, U.S. Marine Corps and U.S. Army helicopters have evacuated 400 American citizens and 489 citizens of other countries from Albania.
- March 27 – The Royal Thai Navy commissions its first aircraft carrier, HTMS Chakri Naruebet.

=== May ===
- May 8 – After China Southern Airlines Flight 3456, a Boeing 737-31B, suffers serious damage while attempting to land at Shenzhen Huangtian Airport (now Shenzhen Bao'an International Airport) in Shenzhen, China, during a thunderstorm, its flight crew begins a go-around and instructs all aboard to prepare for an emergency landing. The airliner then crashes during its second landing attempt, killing 35 of the 74 people on board and injuring nine of the 39 survivors.
- May 11 – Continental Airlines Flight 1760, a Boeing 737-524 with 54 people on board attempting to land through low clouds at Corpus Christi International Airport in Nueces County, Texas, mistakenly lands safely at Cabaniss Field, a part of Naval Air Station Corpus Christi in Corpus Christi, Texas, 5.8 miles (9.3 km) away.
- May 14 – Air Canada, Lufthansa, Scandinavian Airlines, Thai Airways International, and United Airlines form the Star Alliance, the world's first multilateral airline alliance.

=== June ===
- June 6 – American aviation author and pilot Jeffrey Ethell is killed when an engine on the Lockheed P-38 Lightning he is piloting fails and the plane crashes near Tillamook, Oregon.
- June 8 – Ansett Australia begins service to Shanghai.
- June 9 – Two men hijack Air Malta Flight KM 830, a Boeing 737-2Y5Adv with 78 other people on board flying from Malta to Istanbul, Turkey, and order the plane to divert to Cologne, Germany, where they demand the release of Mehmet Ali Ağca, who is serving a life sentence in Italy for trying to assassinate Pope John Paul II in 1981. The hijackers surrender to German police three hours after landing without further incident.

=== July ===
- July 7 – The NASA Pathfinder unmanned aerial vehicle (UAV) sets an unofficial world altitude record for both solar-powered and propeller-driven aircraft, reaching 71,530 feet (21,800 meters) during a flight from the United States Navy's Pacific Missile Range Facility on Kauai, Hawaii.
- July 25 – The Government of Italy establishes the National Agency for Civil Aviation as Italy's national civil aviation authority.
- July 26 – At the Ostend Airshow in Ostend, Belgium, a pilot of the Jordanian Air Force display team, the Royal Jordanian Falcons, loses control of his Walter Extra EA300s. His plane crashes at the end of a runway and bursts into flames near a Red Cross tent and spectator stands, killing him. On the ground, eight people die and 40 are injured.
- July 30 – Air Littoral Flight 701A, an ATR-42, suffered a runway excursion after landing at Florence airport, Florence, Italy. One out of the 17 occupants on board were killed.
- July 31 – FedEx Express Flight 14, a FedEx Express McDonnell Douglas MD-11F cargo aircraft, crashes while landing at Newark International Airport in Newark, New Jersey. All five crew members are injured, but survive; a fire destroys the aircraft.

=== August ===
- August 1 – Boeing and McDonnell Douglas complete a merger, forming The Boeing Company.
- August 6 – Korean Air Flight 801, a Boeing 747-300, crashes on Nimitz Hill in Asan-Maina, Guam, on landing approach to Antonio B. Won Pat International Airport, killing 228 of the 254 people on board.
- August 7 – Fine Air Flight 101, a Douglas DC-8-61F, crashes seconds after takeoff due unsuitable cargo distribution, killing all four on-board and further two on the ground.
- August 10
  - Canadian filmmaker Jean-Claude Lauzon and his passenger, Canadian actress Marie-Soleil Tougas, die when the Cessna 180K Lauzon is piloting crashes into a mountainside near Kuujjuaq, Quebec, Canada, in strong winds and rain while they are returning from a fishing trip.
  - Formosa Airlines Flight 7601, a Dornier 228 registered as B-12256, crashed during a failed go-around attempt. All 16 occupants on board were killed.

=== September ===
- September 3 – Vietnam Airlines Flight 815, a Tupolev Tu-134, crashes short of the runway in a dry rice paddy while on final approach to Phnom Penh International Airport in Phnom Penh, Cambodia, killing 65 of the 66 people on board. Local villagers loot the wreckage.
- September 4 – Continental Express begins regional jet service.
- September 6 – Royal Brunei Airlines Flight 238, a Dornier 228, crashes on a hillside in Malaysia's Lambir Hills National Park while on approach to Miri Airport in Miri, Malaysia, killing all 10 people on board. The wreckage will not found until the morning of September 7, over 11 hours after the crash.
- September 8 – The Boeing 777-300 is rolled out. At 73 metres (240 feet) it is the longest airliner ever built. This title will be claimed by the Airbus A340-600 in 2001.
- September 14 – At the Chesapeake Air Show in Middle River, Maryland, a Lockheed F-117 Nighthawk (serial number 81–793) of the United States Air Force's 7th Fighter Squadron, 49th Fighter Wing, loses its port wing during a pass over Martin State Airport and crashes into a residential area of Bowley's Quarters, damaging several homes. The pilot ejects and sustains only minor injuries, and four people on the ground also suffer minor injuries.
- September 15–21 – The World Air Games are held in Turkey. They include the 10th FAI World Rally Flying Championship.
- September 26 – Garuda Indonesia Flight 152, an Airbus A300B4-220, crashes 29 km (18 mi) from the airport while on approach in low visibility to Medan on Sumatra in Indonesia, killing all 234 passengers and crew. It is the deadliest aviation accident of 1997, and it remains the deadliest in Indonesian history.

=== October ===
- October 10 – Austral Líneas Aéreas Flight 2553, a McDonnell Douglas DC-9-32, crashes at Nuevo Berlin, Uruguay, after its pitot tube freezes, causing the flight crew to receive false readings that the airliner is flying much more slowly than it actually is, resulting in catastrophic damage when they mistakenly deploy wing slats at too high a speed. The aircraft strikes the ground almost vertically at about 1,200 km/h (750 mph), killing all 74 people on board. It remains the deadliest aviation accident involving an Argentinian aircraft, as well as the deadliest one ever to occur in Uruguay.
- October – 12
  - During an air show at Duxford, Cambridgeshire, England, the last airworthy Messerschmitt Bf 109 overshoots the runway while landing following the malfunction of its Daimler-Benz DB 605 engine and crashes, coming to rest upside down. Its pilot, Air Chief Marshal Sir John Allison, Commander-in-Chief of the Royal Air Force's Strike Command, is uninjured.
  - Singer John Denver dies when the Rutan Long-EZ he is piloting crashes into the Pacific Ocean off Pacific Grove, California.
- October 22 – VARIG joins the Star Alliance.

=== November ===
- Trans World Airlines (TWA) and Royal Jordanian Airlines begin codeshare service between the United States, the Netherlands, and Jordan, making TWA the first American airline to offer direct service (via Royal Jordanian flights) to Amman, Jordan.
- Alaska Airlines orders the Boeing 737-900, becoming the launch customer for the aircraft.
- November 17 – ValuJet Airlines terminates operations after merging with AirTran Airways.

=== December ===
- December 6 – A Russian Air Force (RA-82005) Antonov An-124-100 crashes in Irkutsk, Russia, after multiple engines fail during its initial climb after take-off. The crash kills all 23 people on board, as well as 49 people on the ground.
- December 15 – A Tupolev Tu-154 operating as Tajikistan Airlines Flight 3183, crashes into the ground a few kilometres away from the Sharjah Airport runway. Of the 86 people on board, only the flight navigator survives.
- December 16 – Unable to land successfully at Fredericton, New Brunswick, Canada, because of poor visibility, Air Canada Flight 646, a Canadair CL-600-2B19 Regional Jet, attempts a go-around and crashes. No fire results and, although the flight crew is poorly trained in evacuation procedures, emergency response time is 20 minutes, and some people have to be extricated from the plane by rescue services, there
- December 17 – After a missed approach at Thessaloniki, Greece, Aerosvit Flight 241, a Yakovlev Yak-42, attempts a go-around, during which it crashes on Mount Pieria in the Pierian Mountains, killing all 70 people on board. The wreckage is not found for three days; during the search, a Greek Air Force Lockheed Hercules crashes near Athens, killing its entire five-man crew.
- December 19 – SilkAir Flight 185, a Boeing 737-36N, suddenly dives nearly vertically from 35,000 feet (11,000 m) – breaking up in mid-air during the dive – into the Musi River on Sumatra near Palembang, Indonesia, killing and dismembering all 104 people on board the aircraft. Among the dead is Singapore model and author Bonny Hicks. While the Indonesian National Transportation Safety Committee is unable to determine the cause, the U.S. National Transportation Safety Board concludes that a pilot, most likely the captain, deliberately crashed the plane in an act of murder-suicide.
- December 28 – United Airlines Flight 826, a Boeing 747-100, encounters severe clear-air turbulence over the Pacific Ocean two hours after takeoff from Narita International Airport, Tokyo, Japan, bound for Honolulu International Airport in Honolulu, Hawaii. A female passenger is fatally injured, and the plane turns back to land at Narita. On the same day, a PIA plane crash lands at Dubai Intl Airport on landing. It goes through a fence and important runway lights. The craft suffers some damage but it is returned to service.

== First flights ==
=== March ===
- March 4 – NASA Centurion (quarter-scale version)

=== May ===
- May 17 – McDonnell Douglas X-36

=== June ===
- June 25 – Kamov Ka-52

=== July ===
- July 1 – Sukhoi Su-30MK
- July 15 – Beriev Be-103 Bekas ("Snipe")
- July 27 – Griffon Lionheart

=== August ===
- August 13 – A330-200
- August 22 – AASI Jetcruzer 500

=== September ===
- September 7 – F-22 Raptor

=== October ===
- October 16 – Boeing 777-300

== Entered service ==
- May 17 – EHI EH101, later rebranded as the AgustaWestland AW101, with the Royal Navy as the Merlin HM1

== Deadliest crash ==
The deadliest crash of this year was Garuda Indonesia Flight 152, an Airbus A300 which crashed on approach to Medan, Indonesia on September 26, killing all 234 people on board.
