= Yıldız Eruçman =

Turkish parachutist

Yıldız Kayalar Eruçman
- Born: 1919 (age 105–106); Thessaloniki, Kingdom of Greece
- Occupation: Aviator
- Known for: the first female parachutist of Turkey

Yıldız Kayalar Eruçman (born 1919) was the first Turkish female parachutist.

== Early life ==
Yıldız Kayalar was born in Thessaloniki, Kingdom of Greece in 1919. Her family was of Turkish descent, and according to Population exchange agreement between Turkey and Greece, her family moved to Turkey, and settled in İzmir in 1924. In 1934, after the Surname Law, the family assumed the surname Kayalar. Eruçman is her surname by marriage.

== Career ==
In 1935, after reading an article in a foreign periodical about the female pilots, she applied to the training center of Turkish Aeronautical Association in Ankara. Mustafa Kemal Atatürk's adopted daughter and aviator Sabiha Gökçen personally concerned herself with Eruçman's training. Together with three other women in the training center, namely Edibe Subaşı, Nezihe Viranyalı and Sahavet Karapas, she received her aviation certificate. On 4 October 1935, she parachuted from a Soviet-made aircraft of type Polikarpov R-5. She was the first ever female sky diver in Turkey. In later years, she continued in the same association as a trainer. However, her profession was not officially acknowledged. So, her title was "minaret worker", which was considered one of the most dangerous occupations of that time.
