= Nezihe Viranyalı =

- Born: 1925; Vidin, Bulgaria
- Died: December 22, 2004 (aged 78–79); Istanbul, Turkey
- Resting place: Karacaahmet Cemetery

Nezihe Viranyalı (1925 – 22 December 2004) was one of the first Turkish female aviators. She was trained by Sabiha Gökçen, Turkey's first female pilot.

== Biography ==
Born in Vidin, Bulgaria of Turkish descent, she immigrated to Turkey as she was impressed by the Turkish female pilot Sabiha Gökçen's flight tour around the Balkan countries and the air show at Sofia in 1938. At the age of sixteen, she enrolled at the flight school Türkkușu (literally Turkishbird) of the Turkish Aeronautical Association, where Sabiha Gökçen was a trainer. Nezihe Viranyalı learned skydiving first, and later obtained her pilot license for gliders and airplanes. She was the last of the four female aviators trained by Sabiha Gökçen, the others being Edibe Subaşı, Yıldız Uçman, and Sahavet Karapas. She herself trained hundreds of aviators at the Türkkușu Flight School.

In 1955, she took part as a skydiver at the international air shows held in the Netherlands and Germany. Invited by the American pilot Jacqueline Cochran, she went to the United States to attend a course on civil aviation at the University of Tennessee on a scholarship. In 1956, Nezihe Viranyalı displayed her flying skills at an air show in Baghdad, Iraq.

In her career, she parachuted more than 100 times, had more than 180 hours of flight time on gliders and more than 2,800 hours on airplanes. Nezihe Viranyalı retired from her position as an instructor from the Türkkușu Flight School.

She is quoted as saying

"If you’ve made a good landing, it’s impossible to recapture that joy again on another day. The emotions you experience as you bring your aircraft to the parking place and turn off the engine are nothing less than what great conquerors feel when they storm the gates of a fortress. And you have the right to feel that way. You too are a conqueror, who has just conquered the skies..."

Stuart Kline's exhaustive work Türk Havacılık Kronolojisi / A Chronicle of Turkish Aviation mentions her with pictures.

== Private life ==
In the 1940s, she was one of the few women in Ankara to own an automobile. She enjoyed ice skating and playing the accordion. Besides Bulgarian and Russian, she was also fluent in English and German.

Never married, she spent her last years in a retirement home at Maltepe, Istanbul. One of her legs was amputated because of gangrene following surgery on a fractured foot and shoulder bone.

Nezihe Viranyalı died of colon cancer at a hospital in Göztepe, Istanbul on 22 December 2004. She was buried at the Karacaahmet Cemetery.

== Honors ==
In 2004, she was honored with the award "The Successful Turkish Woman" by the newspaper Dünya Gazetesi.
