= THK-13 =

1940s experimental tail-less glider

General information
- Type: Tail-less research glider
- National origin: Turkey
- Manufacturer: Turk Hava Kurumu Ucak Fabrikasi (THK) (en:Turkish Air League Aircraft Factory)
- Number built: 1

History
- First flight: 1948

The THK-13 was an experimental tail-less glider built by the Turk Hava Kurumu Ucak Fabrikasi (THK) in Turkey in the late 1940s.

== Design and development ==
The THK-13 was a tail-less glider, built predominantly from wood with fabric covering, with the pilot sitting in a faired open cockpit on the centre-line at mid-chord. The aircraft was controlled through ailerons on the inner portion of the trailing edges with pitch control through elevators outboard of the fins, situated at approximately ¾-span giving yaw control and stability. The undercarriage was of the mono-wheel type, common to many gliders, but with outrigger wheel struts in the lower fins keeping the aircraft level when on the ground.

== Operational history ==
To validate the design a 10% scale model was attached to a THK-5 and used as a flying wind tunnel, to validate the design values. The THK-13 was initially planned to have a small piston engine or turbojet, but was completed as a glider, principally launched by aero-tow behind a Focke-Wulf Fw 44. The first flight took place in mid 1948, flown by Kadri Kavukçu, lasting for around 30 minutes. Modifications were carried out before the next flight in August 1948, flown by Cemal Uygun. The aircraft took-off, but at 150–200 m (490–660 ft) the right wing dropped, caused by a control restriction, so Uygun carried out an emergency landing, with the aircraft suffering some damage. Repairs were carried out and flight tests resumed, revealing poor yaw stability and heavy rudder forces. The rudders were reduced in area shortly before the THK-13 was exhibited at the 1949 Paris Air Show. Further development of the THK-13 was abandoned when THK's priorities were re-aligned.

== Specifications (THK-13) ==
Data from

General characteristics

- Crew: 1
- Length: 5.04 m (16 ft 6 in)
- Wingspan: 20 m (65 ft 7 in)
- Height: 1.94 m (6 ft 4 in)
- Wing area: 34.5 m^{2} (371 sq ft)
- Sweepback: 20°
- Washout: -4°
- Aspect ratio: 11.6
- Empty weight: 430 kg (948 lb)
- Gross weight: 520 kg (1,146 lb)

Performance

- Stall speed: 48 km/h (30 mph, 26 kn)
- Rate of sink: 0.96 m/s (189 ft/min)
- Lift-to-drag: 24:1
