= SH5 =

SH5, SH-5, or similar may refer to:

- Harbin SH-5, an amphibious aircraft
- Sheremetev Sh-5, a 1930s sailplane
- Siemens-Halske Sh 5, a 1920s aircraft engine
- Silent Hill: Homecoming, a video game
- Silent Hunter 5: Battle of the Atlantic, a video game
- Slaughterhouse-Five, a novel by Kurt Vonnegut
- State Highway 5, see List of highways numbered 5
- SuperH 5, a RISC instruction set
