= Edibe Subaşı =

Turkish aviator

- Born: c. 1920; Erzincan, Ottoman Empire
- Died: 7 May 2011 (aged 90–91); İzmir, Turkey
- Occupation: Aviator

Edibe Subaşı (also known as Edibe Kutucuoğlu, 1920 – 7 May 2011) was a Turkish aviator.

Subaşı was born in Erzincan, and her family moved to Adana when she was three years old. In 1937, the Turkish Aeronautical Association (THK) was established by Mustafa Kemal Atatürk. 36 women applied for training as aviator. Subaşı lied about her age, adding two years to her actual age, and was accepted to the training at Eskişehir. She and four other women, including Sabiha Gökçen and Yıldız Eruçman, became Turkey's first women pilots. Subaşı trained as an aerobatics pilot and as a parachutist, and later became a gliding and light aircraft flight instructor at the THK. She performed at aerobatics shows in the United States, the Netherlands, Germany, Greece, France and Italy.

In 1957, Subaşı had a flying accident and retired. She died in a nursing home in İzmir in 2011.
