= Ann Pellegreno =

American aviator (born 1937)

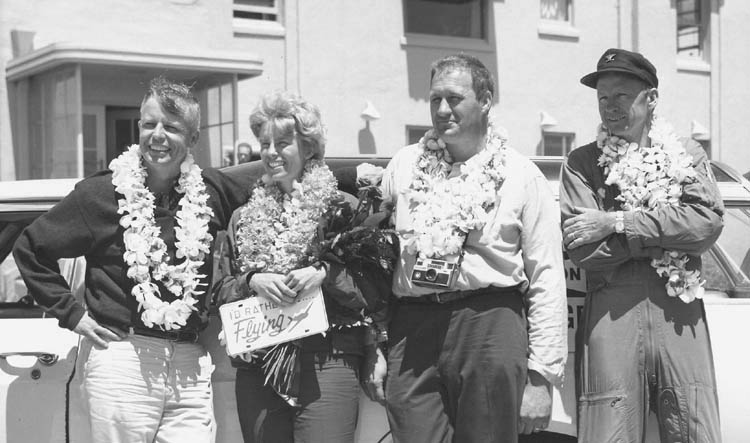
- Ann Pellegreno at Oakland Airport upon the return of the world flight on July 7, 1967. L to R: William Polhemus (navigator), Ann Pellegreno, Leo Koepke (aircraft owner and mechanic) and William Payne (copilot)
- Born: 1937 (age 88–89); Chicago, Illinois, U.S.
- Education: University of Michigan, B.Mus. ’58
- Occupations: Aviator, musician, teacher, author, and lecturer.
- Known for: Business and Aviation achievements
- Spouse: Don Pellegreno

Ann Dearing Holtgren Pellegreno (born 1937 in Chicago, Illinois) is a professional musician, teacher, author, and lecturer. In 1967, Pellegreno and a crew of three successfully flew the same type aircraft, Lockheed 10 Electra, to complete a world flight that closely mirrored Amelia Earhart's flight plan in 1937. On the 30th anniversary of Earhart's disappearance, Pellegreno dropped a wreath in her honor on tiny Howland Island and returned to Oakland, California, completing the 28,000-mile commemorative flight on July 7, 1967.

== Early years ==
In 1961, on the day she obtained her private pilot's license, Pellegreno took her mother up for a surprise flight as her first passenger; Mrs. Holtgren was not aware that her daughter had learned to fly. Within five years, Pellegreno obtained a commercial pilot's license, to which she added ratings for instrument, multi-engine, and flight instructor for airplanes and instruments.

== 1967 flight ==
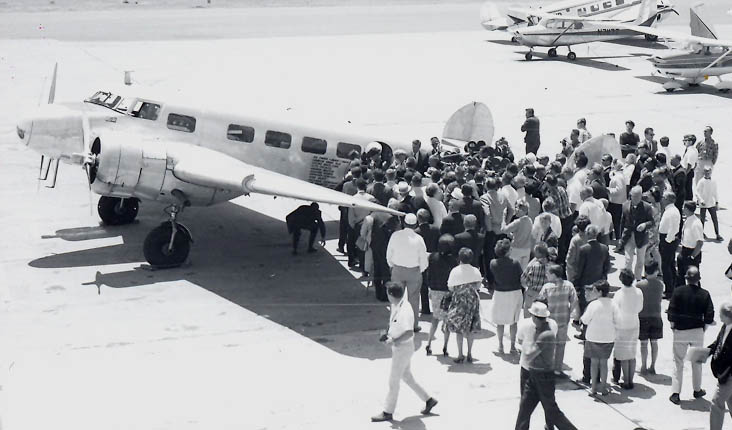
Ann Pellegreno arriving back at Oakland after circling the globe to recreate Earhart's flight in a Lockheed 10

Koepke owned a twin-engine Lockheed Electra 10 that he was restoring at the time, a sistership to that flown by Amelia Earhart on her fateful world flight in 1937.

On June 9, she and her crew of three took off from Oakland, California in the plane. Her crew was made up of William L. Polhemus (navigator), William "Bill" R. Payne (co-pilot) and Lee Koepke (owner and restorer of the Electra). The Electra was originally registered in Canada as CF-TCA and re-registered in the U.S. as N79237 when Pellegreno and her crew made their round-the-world flight.

Pellegreno proceeded from Willow Run, Detroit, Michigan on June 7, 1967 to Oakland, to take off from the same airport from which Earhart departed 30 years before. It was wheels-up on this commemorative round-the-world flight on June 9 when she took off from Oakland flying east on their journey. Pellegreno and her team followed the same route Earhart and navigator Fred Noonan followed in 1937, but for better re-fueling connections landed at differing airports. They carried 2,000 sets of philatelic covers that would be canceled at various cities on their path, to be sold to collectors to help finance their flight. Pellegreno's Electra was equipped with state-of-the-art radio and navigation equipment.

After a refueling stop at Nauru in the Pacific, Pellegreno flew to Howland Island, making a tribute fly-over at approximately the same time and on the same day as Earhart and Noonan would have arrived there 30 years before on July 2, 1937. On that day, July 2, 1967, Pellegreno personally dropped a wreath commemorating the history-making round-the-world effort of Earhart and Noonan. Exactly 30 years later, Pellegreno found Earhart's flight-planned destination – tiny Howland Island – dropped a wreath, and returned to Oakland on July 7 having completed the 28,000 mile world flight. She returned to Willow Run arriving there on July 10.

=== Itinerary ===
Departed Willow Run, Detroit, MI (Pre-Flight), June 7, 1967

- DuPage, IL
- Cedar Rapids, IA
- Ogden, UT

D Oakland, CA (Start round-the-world), June 9, 1967

- Tucson, AZ
- Fort Worth, TX
- New Orleans, LA
- Miami, FL
- San Juan, Puerto Rico
- Caracas, Venezuela
- Trinidad
- Paramaribo, Suriname
- Belem, Brazil
- Natal, Brazil (Atlantic Ocean crossing) June 15, 1967
- Dakar, Senegal, June 17, 1967
- Las Palmas, Canary Islands
- Lisbon, Portugal
- Rome, Italy
- Ankara, Turkey
- Tehran, Iran
- Karachi, Pakistan, June 22, 1967
- New Delhi, India
- Calcutta, India
- Bangkok, Thailand
- Singapore, June 27, 1967
- Djakarta, Indonesia
- Kupang, Timor
- Darwin, Australia
- Port Moresby, New Guinea
- Lae, New Guinea (Pacific Ocean crossing), June 30, 1967
- Nauru Island
- Howland Island (Fly-over), July 2, 1967
- Canton Island
- Honolulu, HI

Arrived Oakland, CA (Finish round-the-world), July 7, 1967

- Phoenix, AZ (Post-Flight)
- Denver, CO
- Newton, KS
- Oshkosh, WI

Arrived Willow Run, Detroit, MI, July 10, 1967

== Later years ==
In 1974 Pellegreno was appointed to the Iowa Aeronautics Commission and also to the Iowa Department of Transportation Commission, the first woman in the nation to serve in that capacity.

Her first book World Flight, the Earhart Trail was published in 1971. The volumes of the trilogy Iowa Takes to the Air (1845-2003) were published in 1980, 1986, and 2003. The author's articles have appeared in McCalls, Air Progress, Air Trails, Sport Aviation, Antique Airplane Association News, and The Annals of Iowa.

Pellegreno was inducted into the International Forest of Friendship of The Ninety-Nines, Inc. (1987), the Iowa Aviation Hall of Fame (1990), the Michigan Aviation Hall of Fame (1991), the Experimental Aircraft Association – Vintage Aircraft Hall of Fame (1997), and the Iowa Women's Hall of Fame in 2001. In 2004 she received the Earhart Pioneering Achievement Award from the Cloud L. Hall Cray Foundation. She received the 2010 Outstanding Involvement in Aviation Award from the Iowa Department of Transportation, Aviation Division. That same year she was inducted into the Hall of Heroes at the Iowa Transportation Museum. In 2023 she was inducted as a Distinguished Educator into the Hall of Fame for the Foundation for Saline Area Schools.

The Lockheed Electra owned by Lee Koepke was, in a previous existence, one of the three Trans-Canada Airlines Electras that were used to initiate transcontinental air service in Canada in 1937. After Pellegreno's flight, the Canada Aviation Museum acquired the aircraft from Koepke. Volunteers from Air Canada (the new name of Trans-Canada Airlines) overhauled the aircraft in 1968 and donated it to the museum. Today, Lockheed Electra (S/N 1112) is part of the National Aeronautical Collection and is displayed in its original CF-TCA configuration.

== See also ==
- Pratt & Whitney
- Lockheed
- Linda Finch
