= Linda Finch =

American aviator and businesswoman (born 1951)

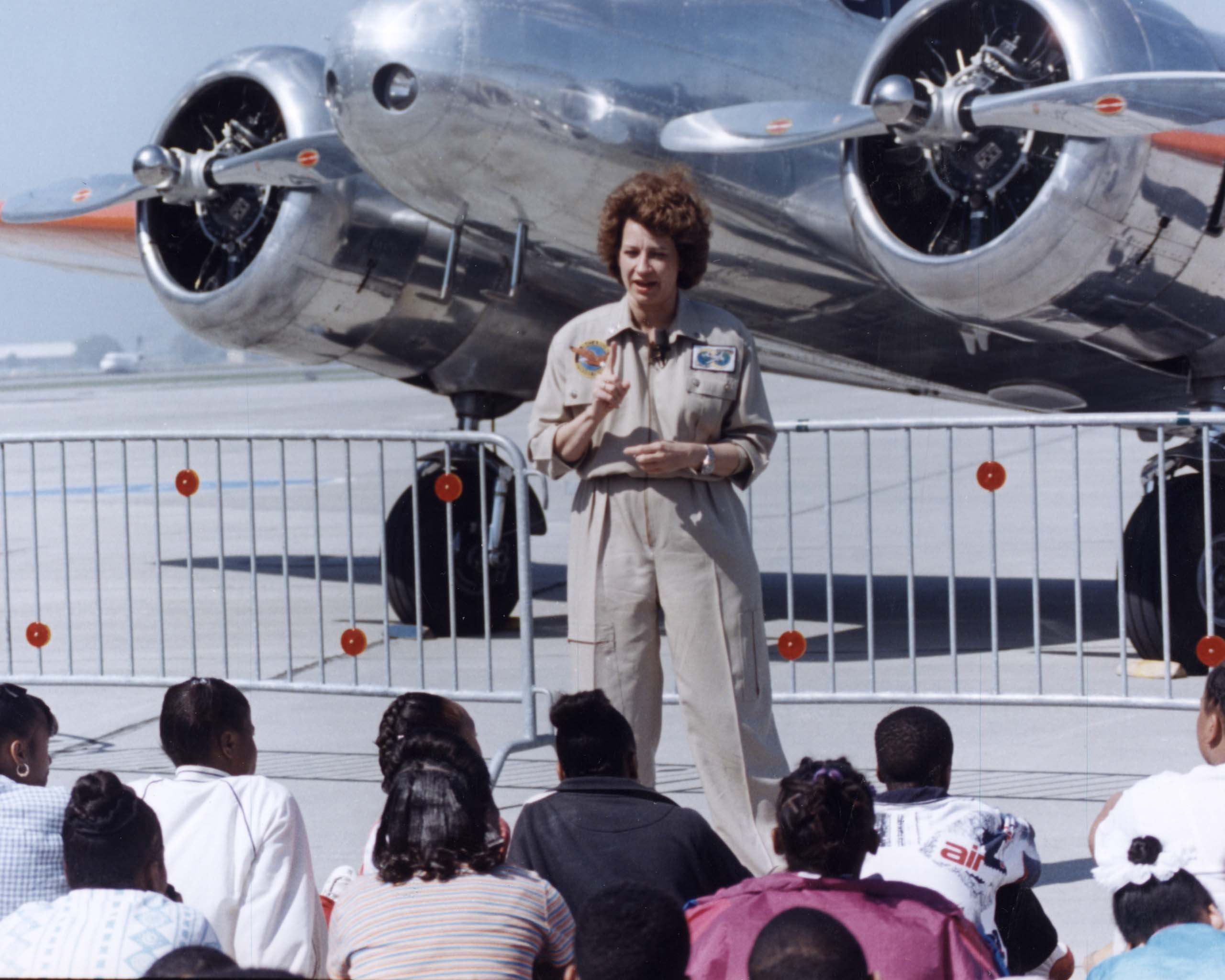
- Linda Finch speaks to children during World Flight 1997 in New Orleans
- Born: Linda Dueler; March 13, 1951 (age 75); San Antonio, Texas, U.S.
- Other name: Linda Finch Doctor
- Occupations: Aviator, aviation historian, businesswoman, author, spokesperson
- Children: 3

Linda (Dueler) Finch, also known as Linda Finch Doctor (born March 13, 1951), is an American businesswoman, aviator, and aviation historian from San Antonio, Texas. Finch had 30 years of experience in the construction industry, making prefabricated buildings, and operating healthcare facilities. She began her career managing nursing homes in her twenties and owned several nursing homes in her thirties. Finch became a pilot and purchased an airplane that she used in her nursing-home business. She later added construction firms to her portfolio.

Finch's primary aircraft interest was World War II-era planes. She has restored vintage aircraft and has participated in air shows and airplane races. Finch became a member of the Confederate Air Force (now Commemorative Air Force).

Finch is best known for her 1997 World Flight, which recreated (and completed) Amelia Earhart's world-record attempt. She flew a restored 1935 Lockheed Electra 10E, which was the type of plane that Earhart flew in 1937 on her around-the-world attempt. Finch's Electra was modified, with a Global Positioning System, increased fuel capacity, and modern communications equipment. She followed Earhart's route as closely as she could and completed the 26,000-mile trip around the world in 73 days. With Pratt & Whitney (who funded the restoration and flight), Finch established the You Can Soar educational and motivational program, which enabled students in 200,000 classrooms to follow her flight. Its website was viewed 30 million times.

The magazine Flying characterized her as a "Veteran aircraft restorer and accomplished warbird pilot."

== Early life and education ==
Linda Dueler was born in San Antonio on March 13, 1951, to Mary Beth and Leslie Dueler. Her father worked for a phone company. She grew up with two brothers in Highland Hills, a neighborhood in San Antonio. When Linda was a teen, the family moved outside the city limits to a neighborhood with good schools where they would have a better standard of living.

Finch left John Marshall High School at the age of 16. Finch worked as a bookkeeper in New Jersey, Texas, South Dakota, Montana, and Illinois. Some of Finch's jobs were at nursing facilities. She studied accounting to further her career at Southwest Texas State University and she earned her high school equivalency certificate.

== Marriages and children ==
At the age of 16, Finch married an Army soldier who was about the age of 19. Her husband left for Vietnam after they were married. Their daughter July was born in February 1969; the couple was divorced in 1970. She was married a second time, during which her son Leslie was born about 1977 in San Antonio. Her third marriage, in 1983 to businessman Delos Finch, lasted for ten years. Her third child is her granddaughter (born about 1995) whom she adopted. She lived in San Antonio, where she owned a 300-acre (120 ha) farm and cattle ranch near Mason, Texas. She also resides in Denton, Texas.

In the mid-1980s, Finch met Laird Doctor at a Reno air show. She became Linda Finch Doctor when they were married in the summer of 1998 at their ranch outside of Dallas. Laird was critically injured in April 1999 in Oshkosh, Wisconsin at an annual event of the Experimental Aircraft Association. Laird had been taxiing a vintage Corsair F4-U when he clipped the wing of another plane that sat on the runway. The Corsair's wing split, the plane cartwheeled, and then it burst into flames. Laird's spinal cord was injured, but it was not fractured. He was left with some paralysis.

== Business career ==
Finch has owned and operated retirement communities, nursing homes, and a construction firm that manufactured prefabricated buildings. She purchased her first nursing home in 1979, followed soon after by a second nursing home, both of which Finch received loans from family members to help finance the purchases. Finch acquired five more nursing homes over the next two years, with a total of 750 residents. She owns the company Care Centers Management Corporation, a nursing home management company, that in 1997 owned four nursing homes and one retirement property. At that time, her businesses employed 500 people and earned $14 million annually. About the time that Finch was landing at Oakland International Airport on May 28, 1997, completing her World Flight 1997, her name was added to a suit filed by the Texas Attorney General's office. The suit, filed in 1994, addressed deficiencies in patient care. Finch stated that any deficiencies were corrected by that time.

== Flying career ==
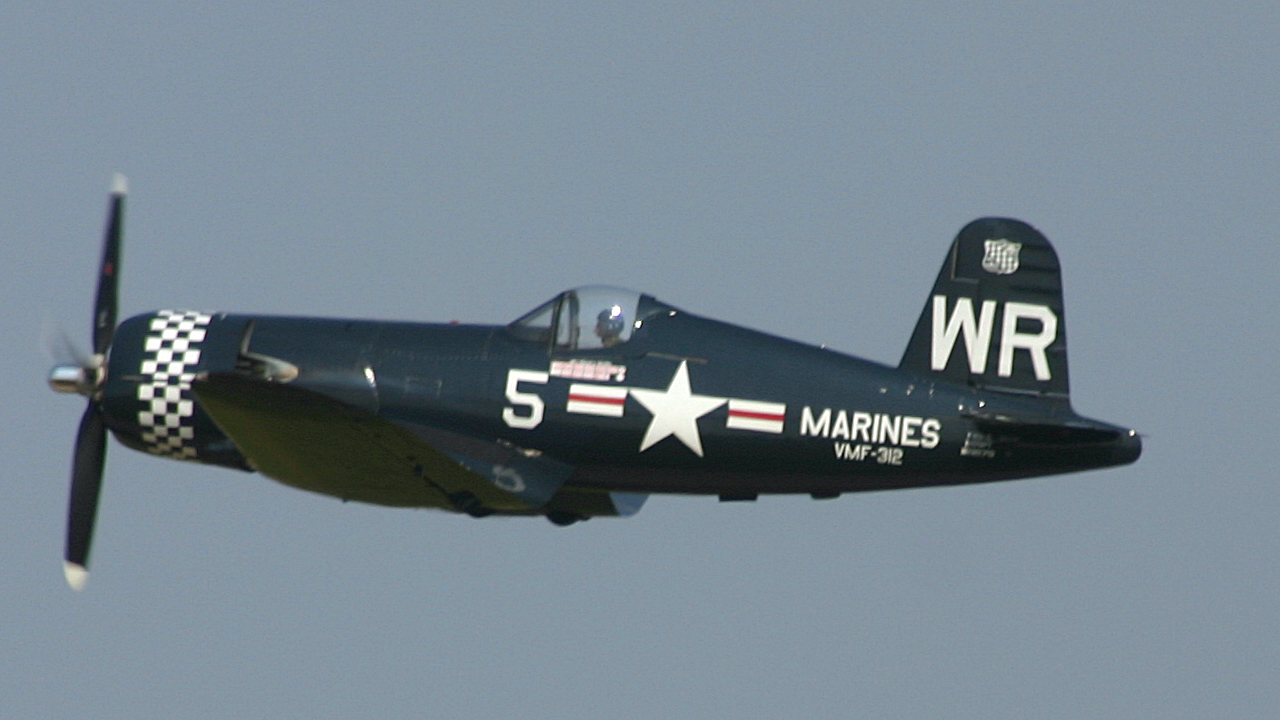
Vought F4U Corsair

Finch saved up the money, $20 at a time, for flying lessons, having dreamed of flying since she was a teenager. She was particularly interested in the gull-winged World War II Corsair fighter plane. Around 1974, Finch began learning how to fly, and she earned her pilot's license in 1979. She purchased a Beechcraft airplane to fly across Texas to conduct business.

Finch then purchased a North American T-6 Texan, a World War II trainer. She restored it in the 1980s and became a member of the Confederate Air Force (now the Commemorative Air Force) to begin participating in air shows. Finch, an aviation historian, restored six vintage planes by 1997.

== World Flight 1997 ==
=== Amelia Earhart ===
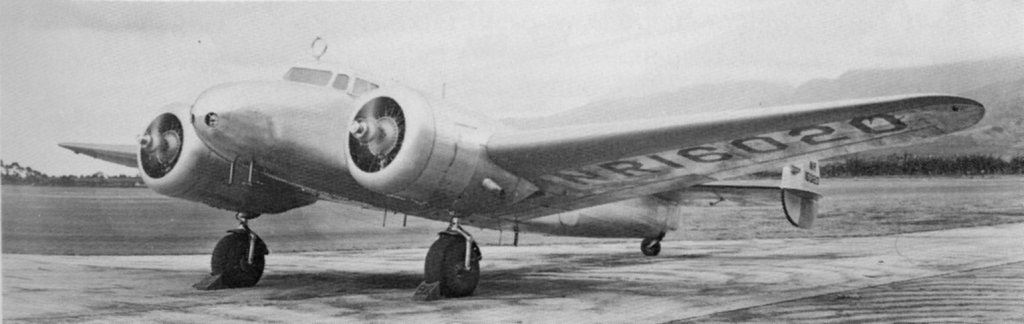
Amelia Earhart's Lockheed Model 10 Electra

Finch, inspired by the deceased aviator Amelia Earhart – who had attempted in 1937 the first airplane flight around the world via the equator – began planning in 1991 to duplicate Earhart's doomed World Flight. With her flight navigator Frederick Noonan relying on the stars at night for navigation, Earhart was expected to land at the tiny Howland Island in the South Pacific on July 2, 1937. When they did not arrive, they were thought to have become lost. (Note: Anticipating the difficult 2,227-mile flight to Howland Island from Papua New Guinea, the Coast Guard cutter Itasca and other U.S. ships monitored Earhart's radio transmissions. She communicated that she was low on fuel and lost. Earhart unknowingly flew around Itasca several times but was unable to see the long trails of black smoke that the cutter had sent. The Electra 10 was lost at sea without a trace.)

In 1997, Finch planned to complete the 29,000 nautical-mile flight around the world that Amelia Earhart attempted in 1937. Finch's flight, called World Flight 1997, marked the 60th anniversary of Earhart's failed effort and the centennial of her birth.

=== Preparations ===
Finch acquired the type of plane that Earhart flew, a 1935 Lockheed Electra 10E. Of the fifteen Lockheed Martin Model 10 Electra planes that were manufactured, only two were available in 1997. Finch found the plane she would acquire sitting on an airstrip in Wisconsin. It had not flown since 1977. (Note: Finch purchased her Electra 10 from its resting place in Amery, Wisconsin since 1983. Before that, it sat at Wissota Airport (five miles east of Chippewa Falls) after its engine was destroyed in 1977.) She acquired it in 1994 for $330,000, after three years of negotiations with the owner. When it arrived on a truck, it was full of rat's and bird's nests. The plane's wings were detached from the fuselage, and the engines and the tail were gone.

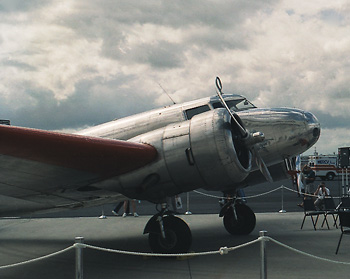
Finch's Electra 10E in 2007

Finch is said to have spent $1 million refurbishing the plane. Pratt & Whitney donated $4.5 million toward the cost of the World Flight 1997 trip, with $3 million spent on the educational program and $1.5 million for the plane. Earhart's Electra was powered by Pratt & Whitney Wasp engines. About $1 million more in donations was needed to cover the total cost of the World Flight 1997 trip and educational program. Also based in Hartford, Connecticut, the newspaper Hartford Courant contributed to the trip's funding. The navigational equipment for the Electra and the plane that flew along with Finch were donated by the Universal Avionics Systems Corporation out of Tucson.

Finch rebuilt and refurbished the plane over two years, guided by Lockheed's manufacturing plans and photographs of the Electra 10. The former 10-passenger-seat airliner was reconfigured for its new mission. Passenger seats were removed and additional fuel tanks were installed, for a total of twelve tanks that held a total of 1,250 gallons of fuel, which weighed 17,000 pounds. (Note: The Leader-Telegram stated that there would be ten fuel tanks.) Two nine-cylinder Wasp engines were assembled from spare parts. Finch flew back and forth to Breckenridge, Colorado, where stronger landing gear was installed and maintenance was performed on the wing tips, engine cowlings, and gas tanks at an aviation repair shop. Finch's flight varied from Earhart's in that she had modern satellite tracking and communication equipment, and Global Positioning System navigational gear. Like Earhart, Finch had a bamboo pole that she could use to speak to her navigator.

Another plane, the Albatross, was outfitted with communication and navigational equipment to accompany Finch around the world. The escort plane monitored the weather for Finch by flying one or two hours ahead of her. The National Geographic Society supplied a video camera for the plane, which was used by the plane's film crew to record Finch's journey.

=== Recreation of historic flight ===
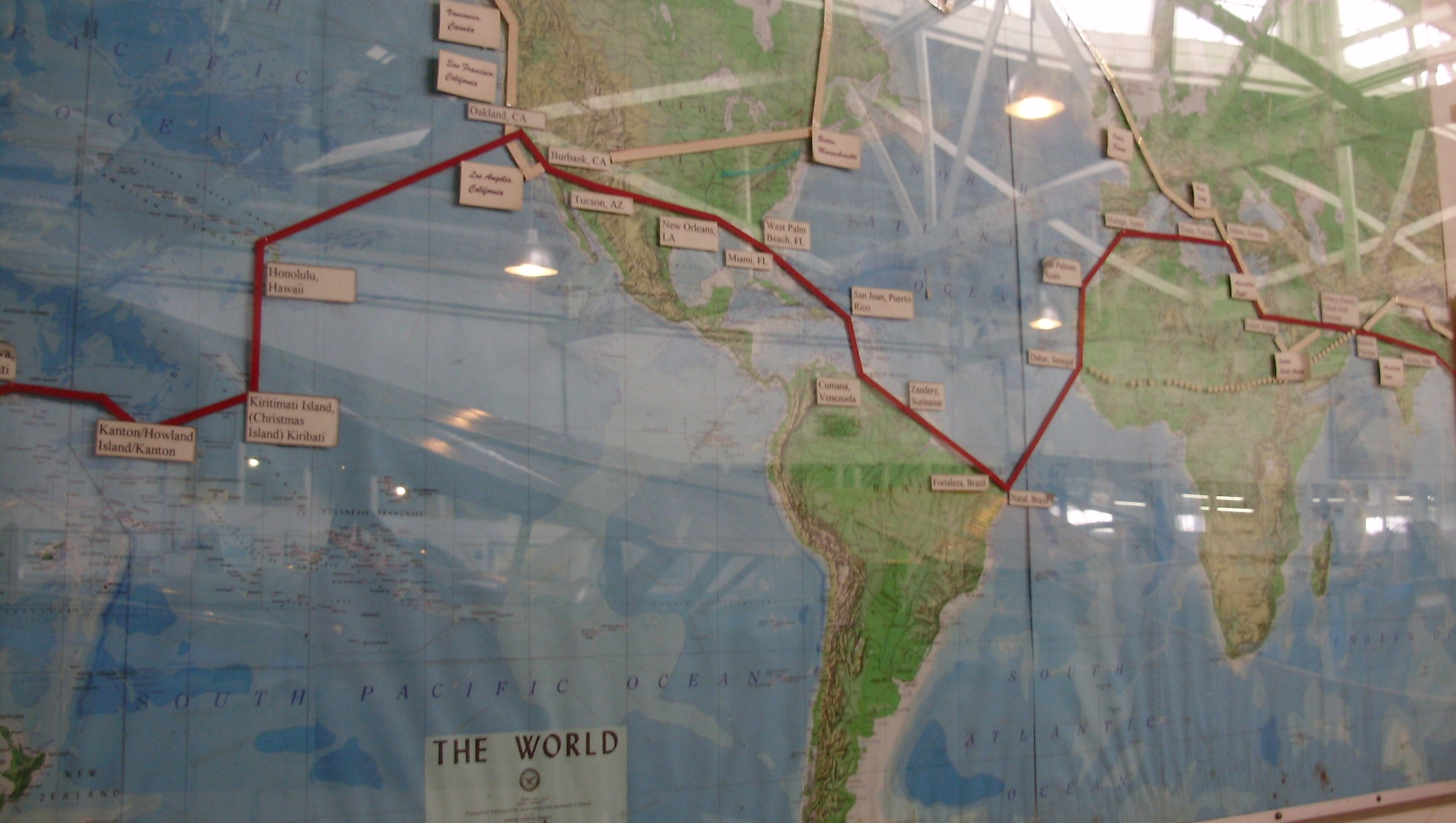
Map of Finch's route (in red) at the Oakland Aviation Museum

Finch and her navigator, Denny Ghirendelli, began their journey on March 17, 1997, when they took off from the Oakland International Airport in California. Her team for each flight included two navigators, two Pratt & Whitney employees, and promotional staff. Seven navigators, one of whom was Peter Cousins, took turns assisting Finch as she flew around the world.

Finch's flight was patterned after Earhart's route, eastward along the equator — and took 73 days. She was in the air for 225 hours while flying 26,004 nautical miles (41,850 km) and stopping 34 times in 19 countries. The plane has a cruising speed of 90 miles per hour (140 km/h). (Note: The Electra's top speed was 202 miles (325 km) at 5,000 feet (1,500 m).) She touched down on five continents. (Note: Texas Monthly stated that she flew over five continents.) Her stops included the Martin Luther King School for Girls in Dakar and, in Egypt, at the Queen of Hatshepsut temple.

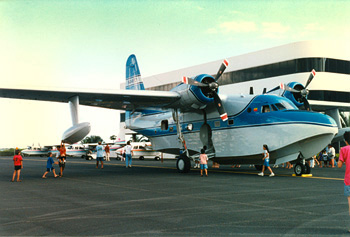
A Grumman Albatross was Finch's emergency and spare-parts plane, which accompanied her on the 1997 flight.

Finch's route differed from Earhart's route in a couple of ways. At the time that Earhart made her trip, geo-political events were leading up to World War II, including Japan's occupation of some of the islands in the Pacific Ocean. Finch could not land on those islands. In 1997, Finch avoided countries that were dangerous due to the country's political climate, like Myanmar and Libya. Nor would she land on Howland Island or Lae, Papua New Guinea because there were not sufficient services or proper runways to land there. In planning her route, Finch had to ensure that every city that she stopped in would have the type of fuel needed for the Electra 10.

Like Earhart, Finch needed to fly at 10,000 feet (3,000 m) for most of the trip because the Electra 10 is not pressurized. During the flight, Finch noted her position every half hour, aided by satellite navigational equipment. It was important to monitor the positioning because some countries required permits to enter their airspace. She used the internet to convey her feelings and respond to correspondence.

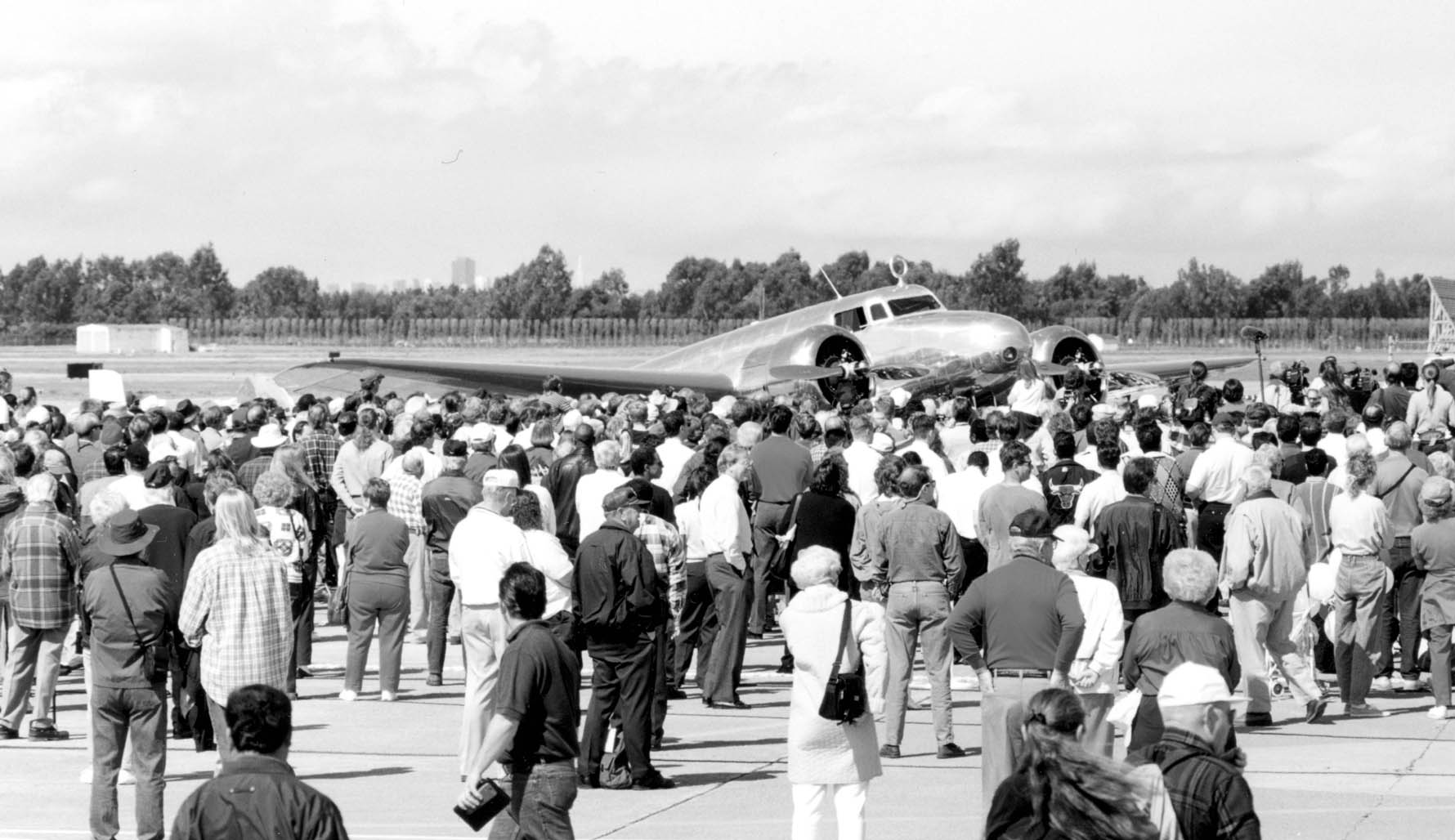
Linda Finch arrived at Oakland International Airport, on May 28, 1997, completing her trip around the world.

The country is magnificent! The mountains are covered with jungle, and some of the small hills are covered with what looks like moss. It is very smooth, almost like a carpet in many shades of green.

— Finch describing Papua New Guinea on May 16, 1997

When she flew over Howland Island, Finch honored Earhart and Noonan by releasing three wreaths from the plane. Finch's flight between Honolulu and Oakland took about sixteen hours. Finch landed at Oakland International Airport that day, where she was met by a large crowd. The Western Aerospace Museum held a dinner in her honor that night.

=== You Can Soar ===
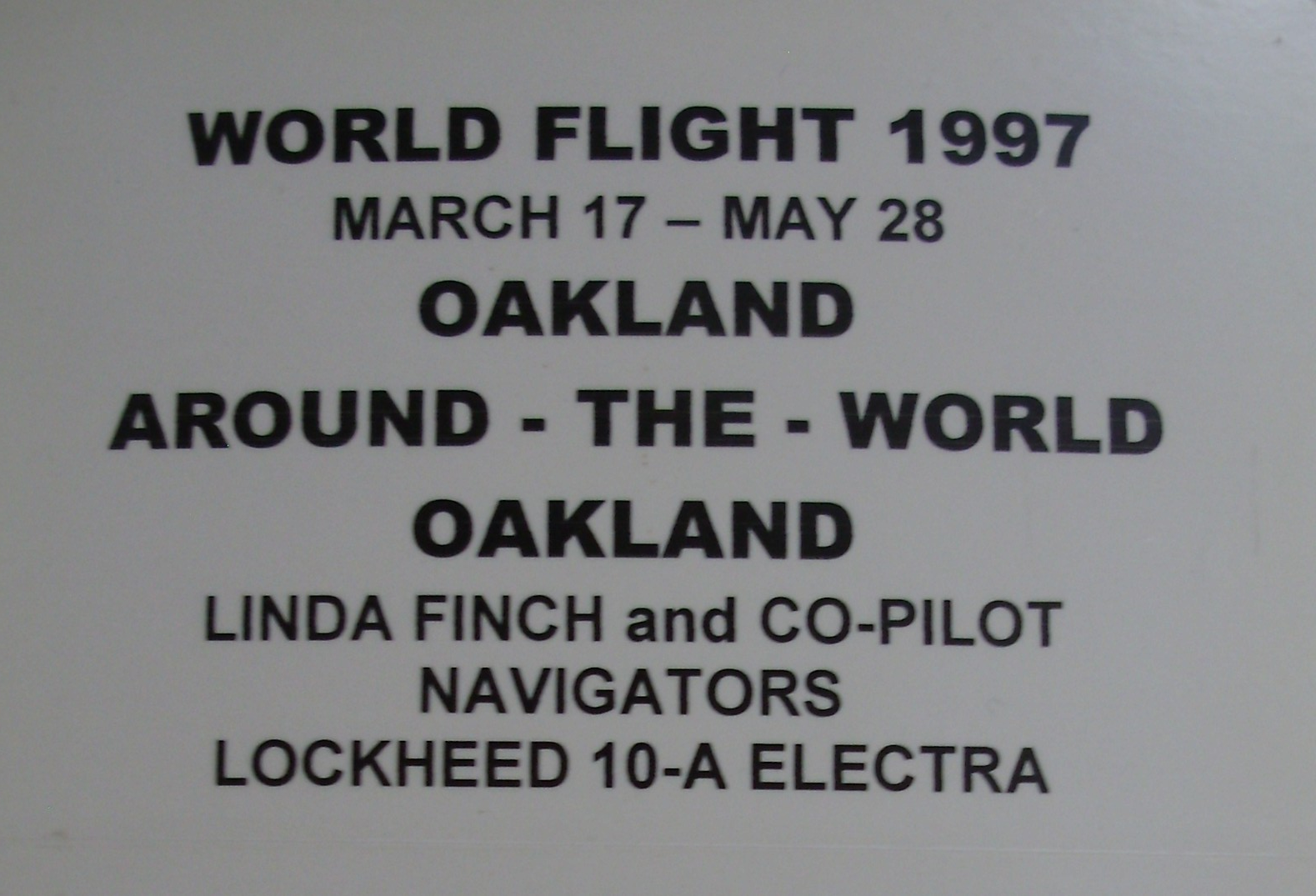
Explanatory display at the museum

An educational program entitled You Can Soar allowed participating 5th through 8th grade students to hone their mathematical skills as they also learned about time zones, aerodynamics, weather gauging, and geography. Addressing the countries that Finch visited, the program's cultural studies portion taught poetry, language, and art.

An internet site tracked the progress of Finch's flight, with hourly updates, which allowed more than a million people around the world to observe and participate in her journey for free. About 200,000 classrooms worldwide monitored the trip based upon information provided by the plane's computer equipment. People communicated with her via e-mail and Finch responded with answers to their questions. There were about 30 million times that people viewed the website during Finch's trip.

She met with schoolchildren in the United States, Africa, and countries around the world. Finch states that the program intended to "emphasize Earhart's pioneering spirit, her vision of limitless human potential and her belief in individual accomplishment."

=== After the flight ===
PBS said about Finch's flight, "Though others have recreated Earhart's flight, Finch is the first to use the same make and model plane as Earhart and to make the attempt with only a pilot and navigator."

The Museum of Flight in Seattle acquired the Electra.

== Legal cases ==
Between May 16 through May 20, 1994, the Texas Department of Human Services (TDHS) made onsite visits to the Dublin Nursing Center in Dublin, Texas, owned by Finch, to investigate the facility for violating the state's Health and Safety Code. Due to the number of violations that they found, Finch agreed to have the nursing center operated by a trustee. The violations included insufficient nursing staff, residents with severe pressure sores, others severely malnourished, negligent care of sores and malnourished patients, and poor sanitation processes for linens and food management. In March 1995, the state Attorney General's office became involved in the case. Five years later, they announced a record-level settlement of $300,000 against the nursing center.

In 1997, Finch was sued by Julie Markel, who had been an employee and friend, over allegations related to the nursing homes owned by Finch. Finch's firm, World Flight, sought and obtained a court order to prevent Markel from speaking with sponsors of the Earhart re-creation.

== See also ==
- Ann Pellegreno, in 1967, completed a world flight by flying a plane similar to Earhart's plane.
