= Sabiha Gökçen =

World's first female fighter pilot

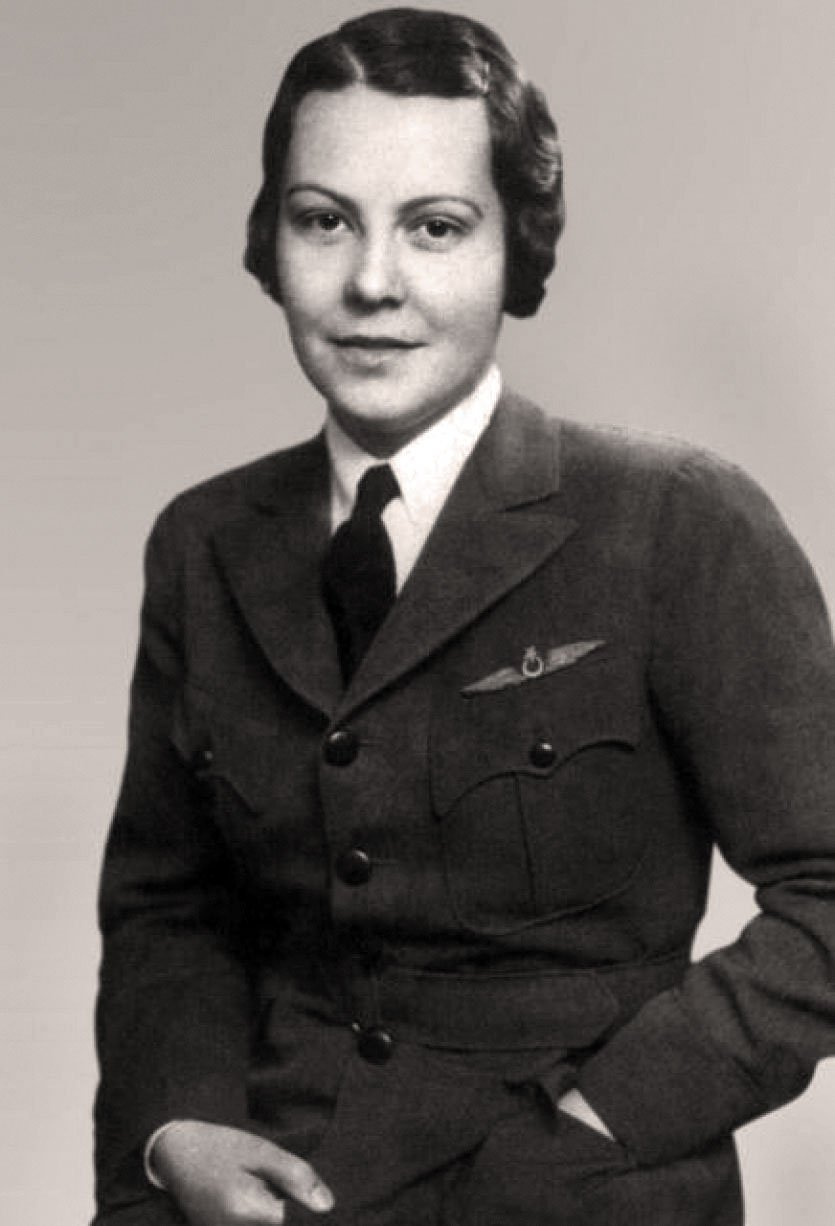
- Sabiha Gökçen, c. the 1930s
- Born: 22 March 1913; Bursa, Hüdavendigâr Vilayet, Ottoman Empire
- Died: 22 March 2001 (aged 88); Ankara, Turkey
- Resting place: Cebeci Askerî Şehitliği, Ankara
- Education: Üsküdar American Academy
- Occupations: Aviator, author and spokesperson
- Known for: World's first female fighter pilot
- Spouse: Kemal Esiner (m. 1940; died 1943)
- Children: 1
- Parents: Mustafa İzzet Bey; Hayriye Hanım
- Awards: FAI Gold Air Medal

Sabiha Gökçen (Turkish: [sabiˈha ɟøcˈtʃɛn], born Ćorović; 22 March 1913 – 22 March 2001) was a Turkish aviator. During her flight career, she flew around 8,000 hours and participated in 32 different military operations. She became the world's first female fighter pilot, at age 23. (Note: Others such as Marie Marvingt and Evgeniya Shakhovskaya preceded her as military pilots in other roles, but not as fighter pilots and without military academy enrollment.) As an orphan, she was one of the nine children adopted by Mustafa Kemal Atatürk.

Gökçen became the world's first woman combat pilot after taking part in military operations during the Dersim massacre, in which she carpet-bombed civilians and massacred survivors with machine guns.

She is recognized as the first female combat pilot by The Guinness Book of World Records and was selected as the only female pilot for the poster of "The 20 Greatest Aviators in History" published by the United States Air Force in 1996. Sabiha Gökçen International Airport, the second airport in Istanbul, is named after her. She was also the subject of an ancestry controversy in Turkey, which led to Hrant Dink's assassination.

== Early life ==
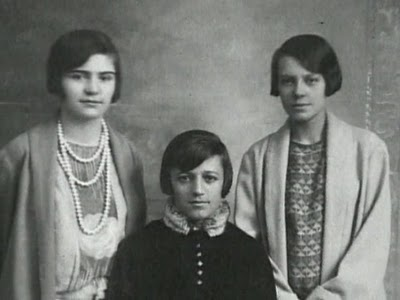
Left to right: Zehra Aylin, Rukiye (Erkin) and Sabiha (Gökçen)

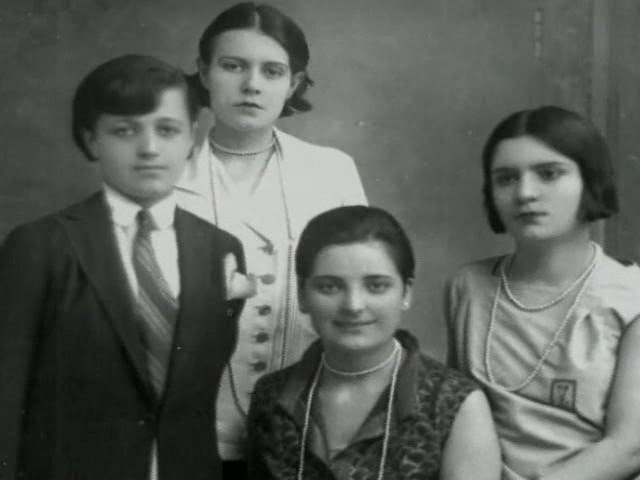
Left to right: Rukiye (Erkin), Sabiha (Gökçen), Afet (İnan), and Zehra Aylin

During Atatürk's visit to Bursa in 1925, Sabiha, who was only twelve years old, asked for permission to talk with Atatürk and expressed her wish to study at a boarding school. After hearing her story and about her miserable living conditions, Atatürk decided to adopt her and asked her brother for permission to take her to the Çankaya Presidential Residence in Ankara, where Sabiha would live with Atatürk's other adoptive daughters, Zehra, Afet and Rukiye. Gökçen attended the Çankaya Primary School in Ankara and the Üsküdar American Academy in Istanbul.

According to a February 2004 article in the newspaper Agos, Gökçen was actually of Armenian ancestry; see Ancestry controversy.

After the introduction of the Surname Law, Atatürk gave her the family name Gökçen on 19 December 1934. 'Gök' means sky in Turkish and Gökçen means 'belonging or relating to the sky'. However, she was not an aviator at that time, and it was only six months later that Sabiha developed a passion for flying.

== Career ==
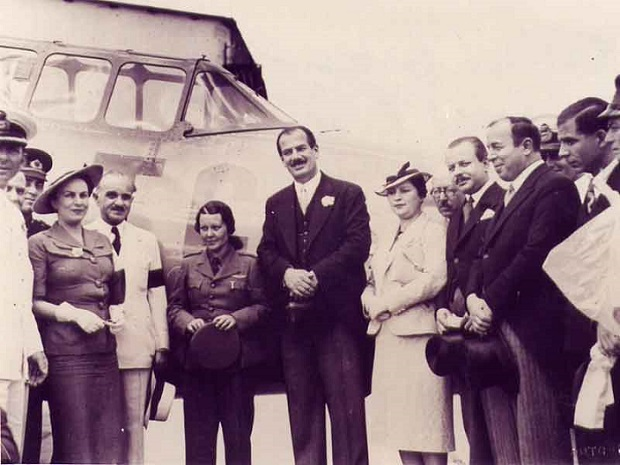
Sabiha Gökçen in Athens, during her 1938 Balkan tour

Atatürk attached great importance to aviation and for that purpose oversaw the foundation of the Turkish Aeronautical Association in 1925. He took Sabiha along with him to the opening ceremony of Türkkuşu (Turkish Bird) Flight School on 5 May 1935. During the airshow of gliders and parachutists invited from foreign countries, she got very excited. As Atatürk asked her whether she would also want to become a skydiver, she nodded, "yes indeed, I am ready right now". Atatürk instructed Fuat Bulca, the head of the school, to enroll her as the first female trainee. She was meant to become a skydiver, but she was much more interested in flying, so she earned her pilot's licence. Gökçen, together with seven male students, was sent to Crimea, Soviet Union for an advanced course in glider and powered aircraft piloting. However, when she was in Moscow, she learned the news that her sister Zehra had died, and with collapsed morale, she immediately returned to Turkey, isolating herself from social activities for some time.

After a while, at Atatürk's insistence, Gökçen began working again. At Eskişehir Aviation School, she received special flight training from Savmi Uçan and Muhittin Bey. She began flying a motorized aircraft for the first time on February 25, 1936.

Gökçen, due to the success in flight training, Ataturk himself said: "You've made me very happy ... Now I can explain what I have planned for you ... Perhaps you'll be the first woman military pilot in the world ... For the world's first military woman pilot to be of Turkish descent would be a proud event, you can imagine, right? Now I will act immediately and send you to Tayyare School in Eskişehir. You will receive a special education there".

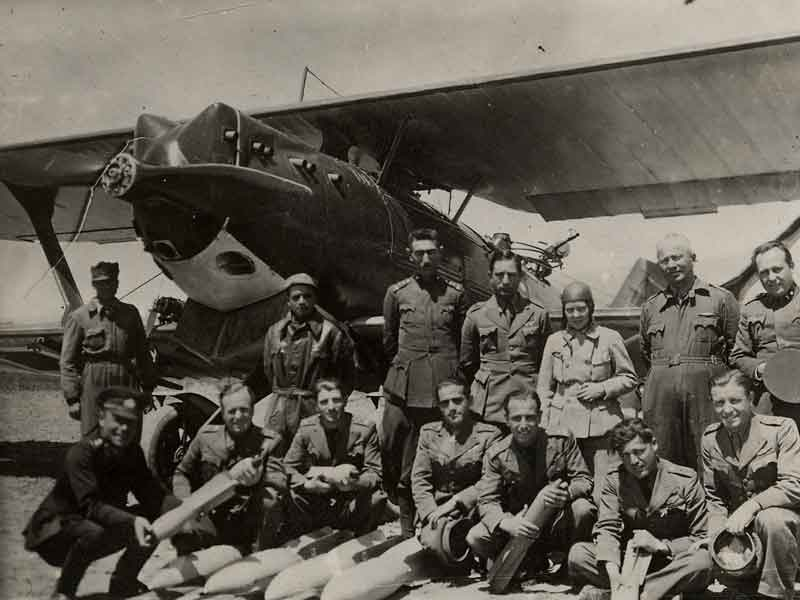
Sabiha Gökçen and her colleagues in front of a Bréguet 19

As girls were not being accepted by the Turkish War Academies in those years, Gökçen was provided, on Atatürk's orders, with a personalized uniform, and attended a special education programme of eleven months at the Tayyare Mektebi (Aviation School) in Eskişehir in the academic year 1936–1937. After receiving her flight patents (diploma) she trained to become a war pilot at the 1st Airplane Regiment in Eskişehir for six months.

She improved her skills by flying bomber and fighter planes at the 1st Aircraft Regiment in Eskişehir Airbase and gained experience after participating in the Aegean and Thrace exercises in 1937. In that same year, she took part in military operations during the Dersim massacre, becoming the first Turkish female air force combat pilot and the world's first woman combat pilot. Turkish planes flew numerous sorties against the Dersim people during the military operation. During the operations, she bombed civilians and killed survivors with machine guns. A report of the General Staff mentioned the "serious damage" that had been caused by her 50 kg bomb upon a group of what the Turkish government referred to as rebels. Nuri Dersimi stated that the Turkish Air Force bombed the district with poisonous gas in 1938 which was later proven correct.

In an interview she gave to Halit Kıvanç in 1956, Sabiha Gökçen stated about the time: "They gave us the order 'Shoot every living thing you see', we were firebombing even the goats which were the food of the rebels". She was awarded with a commendation for her actions during the operation. She was also awarded the Turkish Aeronautical Association's first "Murassa (Jeweled) Medal" for her superior performance in this operation.

In 1938, she carried out a five-day flight around the Balkan countries to great acclaim. In the same year, she was appointed chief trainer of the Türkkuşu Flight School of the Turkish Aeronautical Association, where she served until 1954 as a flight instructor and became a member of the association's executive board. She trained four female aviators: Edibe Subaşı, Yıldız Uçman, Sahavet Karapas and Nezihe Viranyalı. Gökçen flew around the world for a period of 28 years until 1964. Her book entitled A Life Along the Path of Atatürk was published in 1981 by the Turkish Aeronautical Association to commemorate Atatürk's 100th birthday.

== Ancestry controversy ==
According to official Turkish sources and interviews with Sabiha Gökçen, she was the daughter of Mustafa Izzet Bey and Hayriye Hanım, both of whom were of Bosniak ancestry. However, in February 2004 an article in the newspaper Agos, headlined "The Secret of Sabiha Hatun", contained an interview with Hripsime Sebilciyan, a former resident of Gaziantep, who claimed to be Gökçen's niece and that Gökçen herself was of Armenian ancestry. Sebilciyan claimed that Gökçen's birth name was Hatun Sebilciyan and that she was adopted by Atatürk from an orphanage in Cibin in Urfa Province. Sebilciyan said that Gökçen had four brothers: Sarkis, Boğos, Haçik and Hovhannes, and a sister, Diruhi (Hripsime's mother). According to Turkish-Armenian linguist Pars Tuğlacı, who knew Gökçen personally and deemed Sebilciyan's story to be false, Gökçen was born to an Armenian family from Bursa and was left in an orphanage there when her family was deported during the Armenian genocide. Tuğlacı also claimed that Gökçen later found out about her Armenian roots when members of her family contacted her from Beirut and that she visited her Armenian relatives there.

Τhese claims have been disputed by Turkish sources and in interviews with Gökçen herself, as well as by her adopted sister Ülkü Adatepe, who reiterated that Gökçen and both of Sabiha's parents were of Bosniak ancestry.

The notion that Gökçen could have been Armenian caused controversy in the country; the Turkish General Staff released a statement saying that the debate "mocked national values" and was "not conducive to social peace". Hrant Dink, the journalist who wrote the article, came under criticism, most notably from newspaper columnists and Turkish nationalist groups. A leaked US consul dispatch penned by an official from the American consulate in Istanbul contained the observation that the entire affair "exposed an ugly streak of racism in Turkish society." It is believed that the affair was one of the reasons that led to Hrant Dink's assassination in Istanbul in January 2007.

== Death and legacy ==
Gökçen died of heart failure at Gülhane Military Medical Academy on 22 March 2001, her 88th birthday.

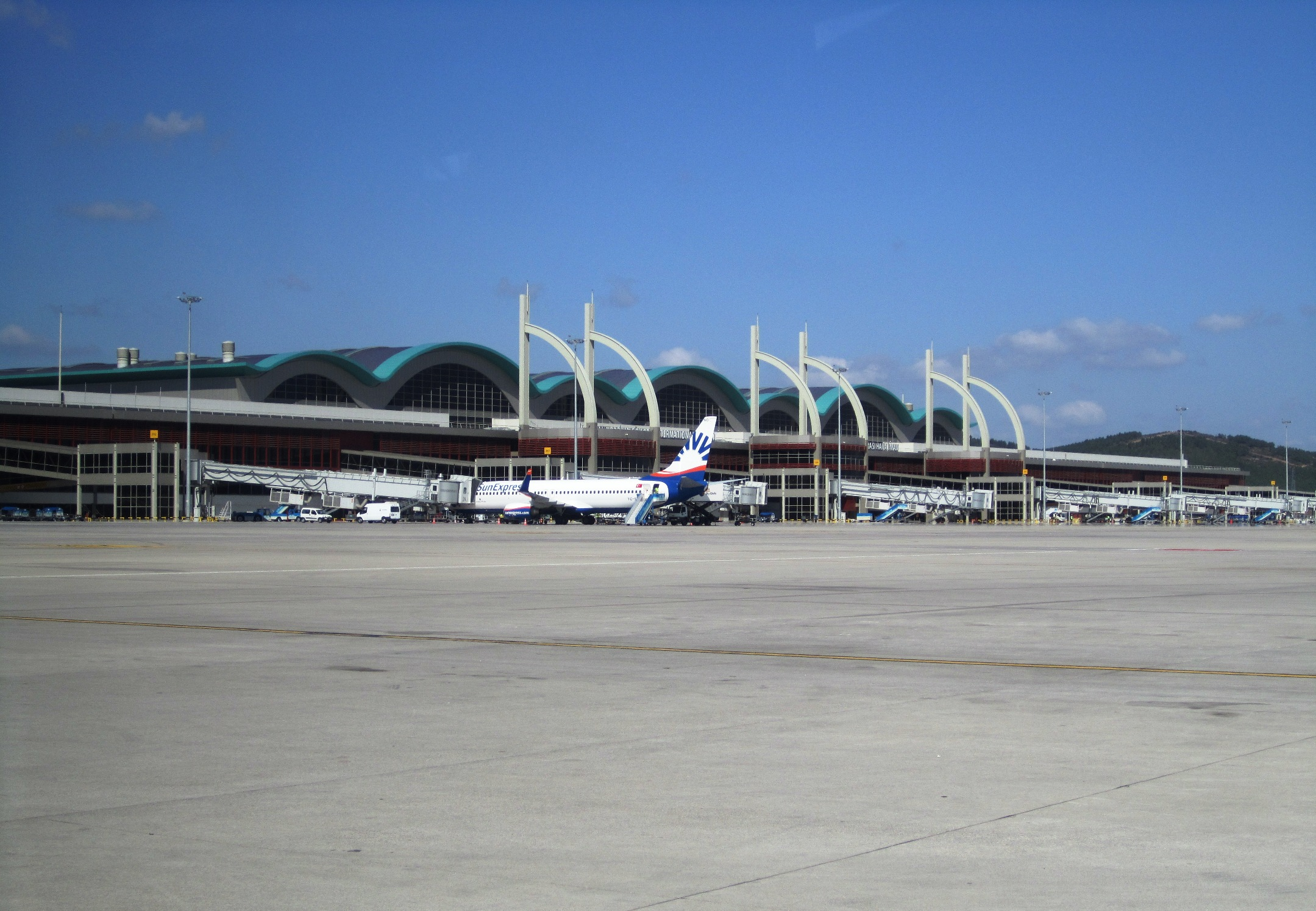
Istanbul Sabiha Gökçen International Airport

Sabiha Gökçen International Airport in Istanbul is named after her. It opened on 8 January 2001, 2 months before her death.

She is recognized as the first female combat pilot by the Guinness Book of World Records.

She was selected as the only female pilot for the poster of "The 20 Greatest Aviators in History" published by the United States Air Force in 1996.

That year, she was also honored at the Air Command and Staff College's Gathering of Eagles at Maxwell Air Force Base. The program encourages the study of aviation history by emphasizing the contributions of aviation pioneers.

She was the subject of a Google Doodle honouring her birthday, which was displayed in Turkey on 22 March 2009.

== Awards and medals ==
- Number one Medal of Övünç (Murassa) and certificate of Turkish Aeronautical Association
- The Badge of the White Eagle, the highest badge given by the Yugoslav Army, and an army badge
- Romanian Army Aviation Badge
- Commemorative medals awarded for the Thracian and Aegean maneuvers
- Pioneer women's plaque in their professions, given at the ceremony in the Turkish Grand National Assembly on the 50th anniversary of Turkish women gaining suffrage and election rights
- Honorary Doctor of Selcuk University
- Gold medal awarded by THK in 1989
- The FAI gold medal, awarded by the International Aviation Federation in 1991 to aviators showing outstanding success in all branches of aviation
- The title of "one of the 20 aviators who made their mark in world history" at the ceremony at the USA's Maxwell Air Base in 1996
- 28 plaques given by the army, various associations and organizations

== Gallery ==
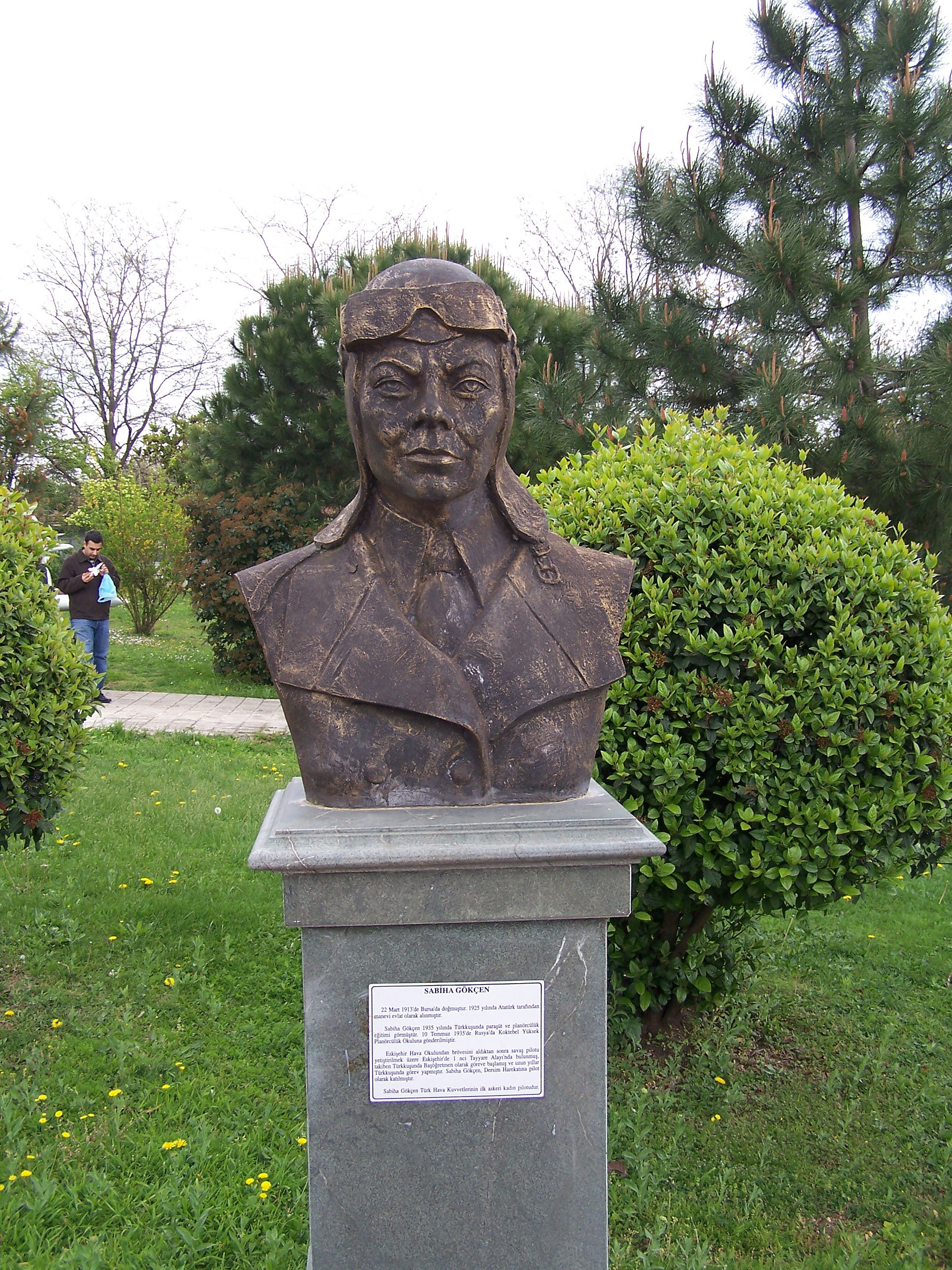
Bust of Sabiha Gökçen at the Istanbul Aviation Museum

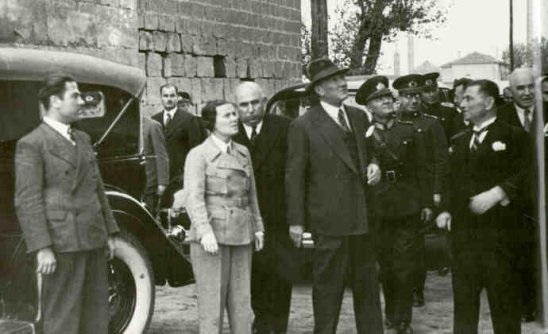
Mustafa Kemal Atatürk, Ali Çetinkaya and Sabiha Gökçen in Diyarbakır

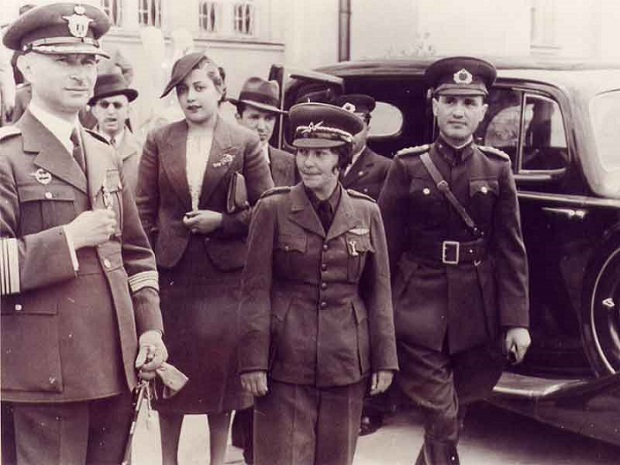
Sabiha Gökçen with Turkish and foreign officers

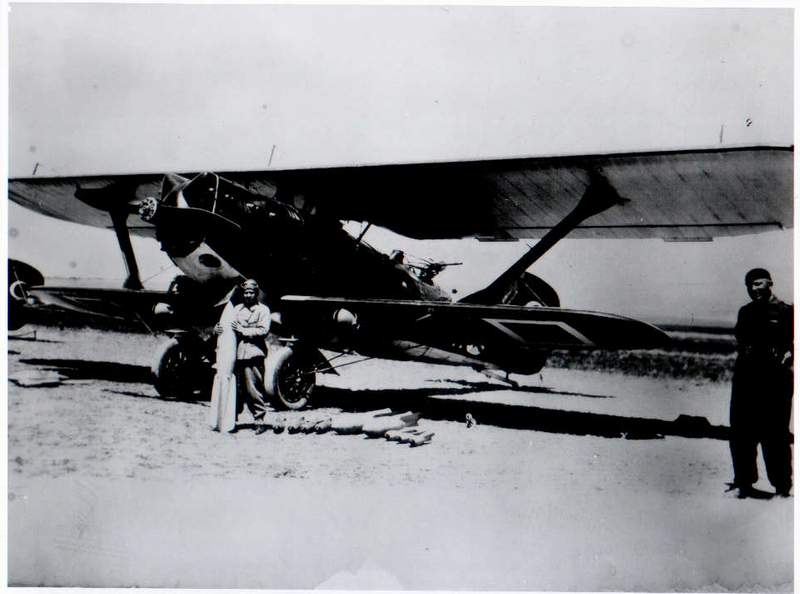
Sabiha Gökçen poses with her Bréguet 19

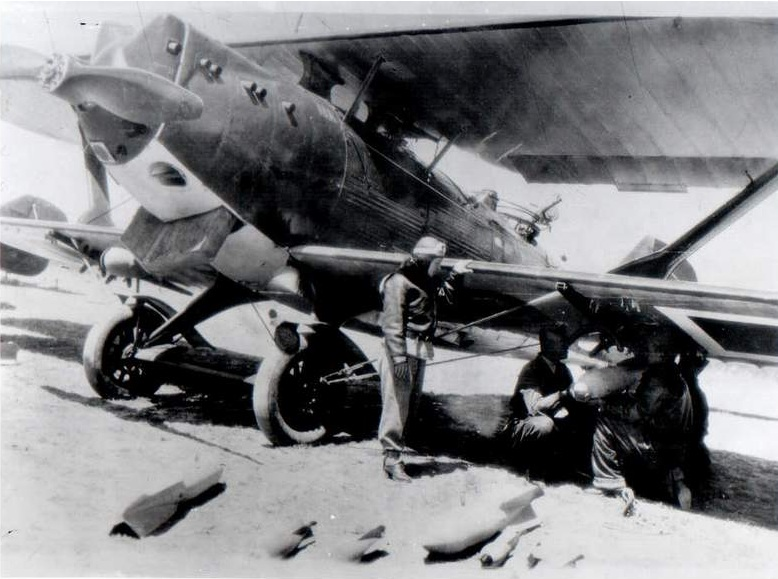
Sabiha Gökçen reviews her Bréguet 19

== See also ==
- Bedriye Tahir Gökmen
- Ahmet Ali Çelikten
- Women in aviation
