= THK-2 =

General information
- Type: Aerobatic trainer
- National origin: Turkey
- Manufacturer: THK
- Designer: Stanisław Rogalski, Jerzy Teisseyre and Leszek Dulęba
- Primary user: Turkish Air Force
- Number built: 6

History
- First flight: 1944

The THK-2 was a single-seat, single-engine aerobatic trainer aircraft developed in Turkey in 1944 intended as an advanced trainer. It was a conventional, low-wing cantilever monoplane with an elliptical planform and of wooden construction. The cockpit was enclosed and the main units of the tailwheel undercarriage retracted backwards into the wing.

Designed by Polish engineers who had come to Turkey to help establish the Türk Hava Kurumu factory, the first prototype flew in 1944 and the second flew the following year. This led to production in series, but only four further examples were built before the project was abandoned. When THK was taken over by MKEK, this was one of the designs selected for further work. However, although the designation MKEK-2 was allocated, nothing further came of this. The THK-2s were used by the Turkish Air Force in their intended role until the mid-1950s.

== Specifications ==
Data from Jane's All The World's Aircraft 1951–52

General characteristics

- Crew: 1
- Length: 6.98 m (22 ft 11 in)
- Wingspan: 8 m (26 ft 3 in)
- Height: 2.08 m (6 ft 10 in)
- Wing area: 10.4 m^{2} (112 sq ft)
- Empty weight: 490 kg (1,080 lb)
- Gross weight: 660 kg (1,455 lb)
- Powerplant: 1 × de Havilland Gipsy Major , 101 kW (135 hp)

Performance

- Maximum speed: 265 km/h (165 mph, 143 kn)
- Cruise speed: 220 km/h (140 mph, 120 kn)
- Stall speed: 80 km/h (50 mph, 43 kn)
- Never exceed speed: 500 km/h (310 mph, 270 kn)
- Range: 700 km (430 mi, 380 nmi)
- Endurance: 3.5 hr
- Service ceiling: 6,000 m (20,000 ft)
- Rate of climb: 8.7 m/s (1,710 ft/min)
