= 10th FAI World Rally Flying Championship =

10th FAI World Rally Flying Championship took place between September 14–21, 1997 in Antalya, Turkey, as a part of the 1st World Air Games.

== Competitors ==
There were 82 crews from Poland (5), South Africa (5), Germany (5), Austria (5), Chile (5), Greece (5), Czech Republic (4), Slovakia (4), Hungary (4), Turkey (4), United States (3), France (3), Croatia (3), Italy (3), Russia (3), United Kingdom (2), Spain (2), Republic of Macedonia (2), Cyprus (2), Brazil (2), Switzerland (1), Lithuania (1), New Zealand (1), Slovenia (1), Denmark (1), the Netherlands (1), Luxembourg (1), Mozambique (1), Indonesia (1) (there are no details given as for two crews).

== Contest ==
First navigation competition results:

1. Krzysztof Wieczorek / Wacław Wieczorek POL - 54 points (penal)
2. Janusz Darocha / Zbigniew Chrząszcz POL - 64 pts
3. Jiři Jakes / Lubomir Šťovíček CZE - 80 pts
4. Włodzimierz Skalik / Ryszard Michalski POL - 84 pts
5. Marek Kachaniak / Sławomir Własiuk POL - 160 pts

Second navigation competition results:

1. Marek Kachaniak / Sławomir Własiuk POL - 62 pts
2. Jiři Jakes / Lubomir Šťovíček CZE - 88 pts
3. Kazda / Stastny SVK - 115 pts
4. Dariusz Zawłocki / Jerzy Markiewicz POL - 133 pts
5. Włodzimierz Skalik / Ryszard Michalski POL - 180 pts

Third navigation competition results:

1. Krzysztof Wieczorek / Wacław Wieczorek POL - 84 pts
2. František Cihlář / Petr Toužimský CZE - 168 pts
3. Włodzimierz Skalik / Ryszard Michalski POL - 180 pts
4. Philippe Odeon / Girault FRA - 245 pts
5. Marek Kachaniak / Sławomir Własiuk POL - 247 pts

== Results ==
=== Individual (10 best) ===
#	Pilot / navigator	Country	Aircraft	Penal points for 1st / 2nd / 3rd competition = total
1.	Krzysztof Wieczorek / Wacław Wieczorek	POL		54 + 292 + 84	430 (292)
2.	Janusz Darocha / Zbigniew Chrząszcz	POL		64 + 224 + 342	630 (342)
3.	Włodzimierz Skalik / Ryszard Michalski	POL		84 + 180 + 180	444
4.	Marek Kachaniak / Sławomir Własiuk	POL		160 + 62 + 247	469
5.	Jiři Jakes / Lubomir Šťovíček	CZE		80 + 88 + 316	484
6.	František Cihlář / Petr Toužimský	CZE		276 + 231 + 168	675
7.	Hubert Huber / Johannes Cserveny	AUT		216 + 277 + 815	1308 (815)
8.	Dariusz Zawłocki / Jerzy Markiewicz	POL		388 + 133 + 324	845
9.	Nathalie Strube / Patrick Sicard	FRA		443 + 278 + 279	1000
10.	Nigel Hopkins / Dale de Klerk	ZAF		186 + 612 + 282	1080

Note: crews from the 1st, 2nd and 7th places apparently were taken into account with a result of only one (worst) competition.

=== Team ===
Two best crews were counted

1. POL - 634 pkt
2. CZE - 1159
3. AUT - 2341
4. ZAF - 2366
5. HRV - 2661
6. FRA - 2898
7. SVK - 3808
8. GBR - 4099
9. DEU - 4286
10. HUN - 4369
11. ITA - 5948
12. CHL - 6048
13. MKD - 6843
14. TUR - 7364
15. ESP - 9057
16. RUS - 9135
17. GRC - 9978
18. CYP - 11474
19. BRA - 13035
20. USA - 14628

== See also ==
- 9th FAI World Rally Flying Championship
- 11th FAI World Rally Flying Championship
