= Stavropolskaya Aktsionernaya Avia Flight 1023 =

1997 aviation accident

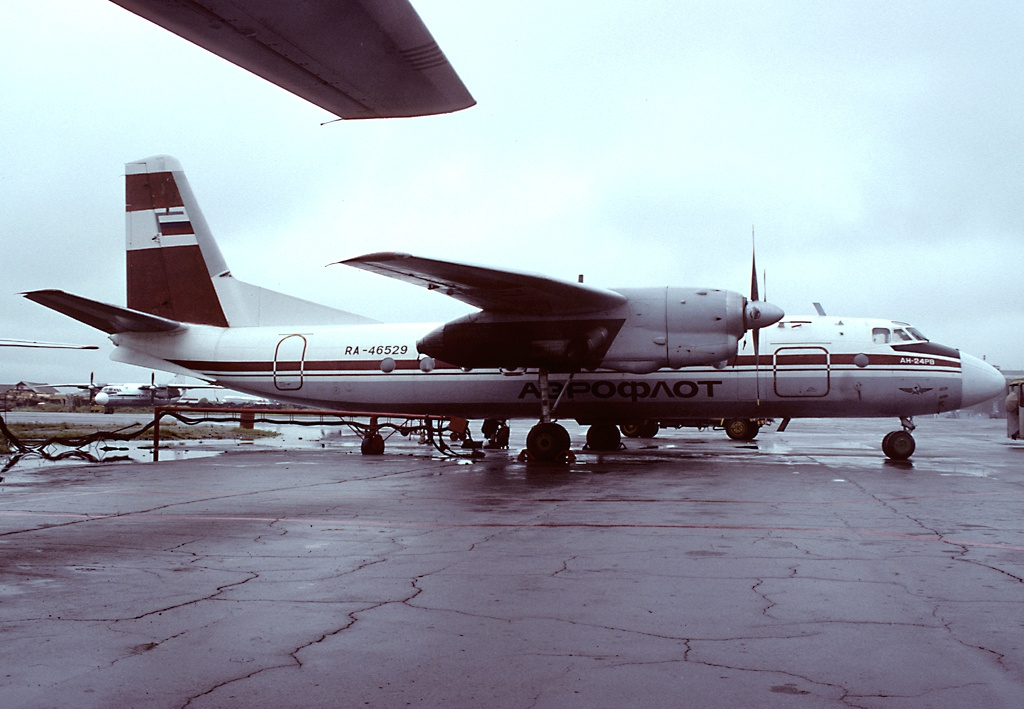
- A Antonov An-24 similar to the aircraft involved

Accident
- Date: 18 March 1997
- Summary: Structural failure of tail due to corrosion, improper maintenance
- Site: Cherkessk, Russia; 44°13′N 42°03′E

Aircraft
- Aircraft type: Antonov An-24
- Operator: Stavropolskaya Aktsionernaya Avia
- Registration: RA-46516
- Flight origin: Stavropol Shpakovskoye Airport, Russia
- Destination: Trabzon Airport, Turkey
- Passengers: 44
- Crew: 6
- Fatalities: 50
- Survivors: 0

Stavropolskaya Aktsionernaya Avia Flight 1023 was an international charter flight between Stavropol in southern Russia and Trabzon in Turkey operated by the Russian airline Stavropolskaya Aktsionernaya Avia (SAAK). On 18 March 1997, while cruising at 6,000 metres (20,000 ft), the Antonov An-24 operating the flight suffered a catastrophic structural failure, in which its tailplane separated in mid-flight. The aircraft then disintegrated and crashed into a forest, killing all 50 passengers and crew on board.

The final report concluded that the crash was caused by improper maintenance by the airline and lack of oversight on the proper maintenance procedures. The aircraft had been brought back from multiple flights in Africa and corrosions had appeared under the aircraft's lavatory. The ground crew had not properly maintained the aircraft, causing the cracks to form and widen, that eventually travelled through the entire tailplane and caused the tail to separate.

== Background ==
=== Aircraft ===
The aircraft involved in the accident was an Antonov An-24 with a registration number of RA-46516. The aircraft, manufactured in 1973, was operated by Aeroflot for two decades before being delivered to SAAK airlines in 1993. Its newest airworthiness certificate was issued in 1996. The aircraft had accrued a total flying hours of more than 41,000 flight hours. Its last overhaul was conducted 1991 and had gone into repair for 7 times. The last operational maintenance was conducted on 18 March 1997, the day of the accident. At the time of the accident, the aircraft was still painted with the Aeroflot livery.

=== Passengers and crew ===
There were 44 passengers and 6 crew members on board, consisted of five cockpit crews and one cabin crew member. The passengers were mainly traders who planned to purchase cheap consumer goods in Turkey, all of whom were Russian citizens.

Among the passengers was one of the directors of the airline, Felix Asanov.

The commander of the flight was 41-year-old Captain Viktor Vasilyevich Goncharov. Graduated from Krasnokutsk Flight School, he had a flying experience of 12,641 hours, of which 11,600 hours were on the An-24 and more than 9,000 hours as a Captain. His co-pilot was 34-year-old First Officer Igor Evgenievich Osipov. He had accrued a total flying hours of 4,563 hours, more than 2,500 of which were on the An-24. The navigator was 40-year-old Valery Anatolyevich Nikiforov, who had flown with more than 11,500 hours. The last cockpit crew member was 38-year-old Flight Engineer Rustem Nurievich Asanov, who had nearly 4,000 hours of flight experience.

The flight was also carrying two off-duty flight crew, who were listed as passengers.

== Accident ==
The flight was a frequently operated charter between Stavropol and Trabzon on the Black Sea coast of Turkey. On 18 March 1997, the crew of the flight underwent pre-flight checks and prepared the Antonov An-24 for flying. At 08L40 a.m, the crew received weather information for their route. The relayed comms indicated that there would be strong winds of up to 90 km/h at altitudes between 5,000 metres (16,000 ft) and 7,000 metres (23,000 ft). Afterwards, the cargo was loaded with 170 kg of baggages and 41 passengers. At around 09:30 a.m local time, the aircraft took off from Stavropol Shpakovskoye Airport.

=== Crash ===
After taking off, the aircraft climbed to 2,700 metres (8,900 ft) and approached Severny. At 09:37 a.m, communications between the ground controller and the crew were transferred to Mineralnye Vody. The aircraft climbed further to 4,800 metres (15,700 ft) and continued to climb to 5,400 metres (17,700 ft). The crew then requested for further climb to 6,000 metres (20,000 ft), before finally levelling off. The flight crew were at their assigned stations and kept doing their task. The engine thrust was set and the autopilot was engaged. The aircraft was flying with a steady airspeed of 320 - 330 km/h.

While leveling off, flight engineer Rustem Asanov went out of the cockpit and walked to the tail section, as per the assigned flight procedure that had been given to him. Flight attendant Olga Spivakova was still at her station. Around 37 minutes after takeoff, at 10:03 a.m. local time, one of the passengers had stood up and gone to the lavatory and had just closed the door when a sudden loud explosion was heard, followed by a huge swoosh of wind and the separation of the tailplane of the Antonov An-24. Flight engineer Asanov was quickly sucked out of the aircraft to his death, while some seats on the back also detached from the aircraft. The aircraft immediately nosedived, with parts of the fuselage chipping off. Due to the abrupt changes in air pressure, g-forces, and oxygen level, everyone on board was quickly affected by hypoxia.

The radar blip of Flight 1023 suddenly disappeared from the radar, and instead, there were now two objects flying on a northward trajectory. Both objects kept flying for approximately 4 km before they finally disappeared as well. Air traffic control then tried to contact Flight 1023, but got no answers. Shortly after, the tailplane fell onto an open field in Cherkessk, while the remaining fuselage crashed onto a forest, crashing down with its nose and with a steep 55-degree left-wing angle. The remaining fuel on board resulted in a huge explosion. All 50 people on board were killed. According to forensics investigation, majority of those on board were still conscious when the aircraft impacted the ground.

=== Immediate response ===
External videos
- Crash site footage
- News report and footage of the crash site on YouTube

Having lost all contact with Flight 1023, ATC declared the aircraft as missing. By 10:39 a.m, a rescue team was formed to search for the aircraft. Approximately 18 minutes later, the team received a telephone call from local authorities that an aircraft had just crashed on a forest, about 1 km off Cherkessk. Wreckage of the Antonov An-24 was found scattered over a wide area in a forest near the village of Prigorodny, east of Cherkessk, northern Caucasus. The tail of the plane was discovered 1.7 kilometres (1.1 miles) from the rest of the debris, suggesting that the aircraft may have disintegrated in mid-air.

Firefighting services were immediately deployed by the crash site to douse the flames. The crash caused fires of approximately 10-12 square meters in area. By 10:40 a.m, all fires were managed to be extinguished. Meanwhile, Russian military dispatched helicopters to help rescue services. Three ambulances were deployed, but no medical assistance was given as it became immediately clear that there were no survivors from the crash. The site was immediately cordoned off by authorities.

== Investigation ==
=== Preliminary investigation ===
A wide area of wreckage suggested that Flight 1023 had suffered a mid-air breakup. The tailplane was located 1.7 kilometres (1.1 miles) from the rest of the wreckage. This was corroborated by findings that showed that the radar blip of Flight 1023 had turned from one object to two objects, one slightly north and one slightly south, flying in a northward direction for 4 km before finally disappearing. In the direction of the flight, fragments of the fuselage and personal belongings were recovered along the path, confirming that the aircraft had indeed broken up in mid-air.

Several theories were initially explored, including the possibilities of an in-flight fire, a surface-to-air missile attack, and terrorism. However, all of them were dismissed. Wreckage of the aircraft suggested that there were no external forces that had caused the aircraft to break up. No explosive traces were found. Forensic findings indicated that those on board were killed by major trauma, presumably at the moment of impact with the ground. Examination of the victims' adrenal glands suggested that many were under severe stress before their deaths.

The wreckage showed that the aircraft had been corroding for a while. Multiple areas located beneath the lavatory and pantry were found to be "exfoliating," indicating a water-induced corrosion. The finding suggested that leaks from the pipe system might have caused corrosion to develop. This leak likely was either neglected or undetected, as the corrosion had seeped deep into the inner layers of the underfloor and exterior of the aircraft. Numerous cycles of pressurization caused cracks to form within the weaker walls of the aircraft.

The process of the mid-air breakup was suspected to have started from the source of the first crack, which was located right under the toilet drain. The failure started from the starboard side first. Following pressurization, a longitudinal crack began to form, propagating forward and aft. Eventually, two cracks widened transversely to the port side and ended at the aircraft's rear door. Additional weakening from static cracks located at the port section caused the empennage and rear fuselage to detach from the aircraft, as the walls could no longer hold onto the main airframe.

=== Improper maintenance ===
The corrosion on the wreckage was found to be worse on the right side than the left side, with the depth of corrosion almost twice that on the left. Some of the areas showed signs of intergranular corrosion, while others indicated that the layers had delaminated. The findings should have warranted the operators to take an overhaul of the aircraft for immediate repair. The problem would be rectified by replacing the damaged skin sections.

Corrosion on the An-24, particularly around the lavatory section, was an already known issue. According to the investigation, proper maintenance would've resolved the problems immediately. However, in Flight 1023, wreckage inspection suggested that the repair procedure was not followed. The depth of corrosion on the toilet area itself had reached 0.85 nm, which exceeded the acceptable amount for normal operation of the aircraft. Instead of being grounded, the aircraft involved in the crash was still allowed to be operated, and its airworthiness certificate was even extended.

Investigation into the aircraft's history revealed that the aircraft had been operating in Africa for years before being transferred back to Russia. From 1994, the aircraft was flown to Zimbabwe and was stored there until 1995 before being finally operated in the Republic of Congo for 16 months under hot and humid conditions. While in Africa for 1 year and 4 months, the aircraft flew for about 940 hours. Tests conducted by investigators showed that under hot and humid conditions, the corrosion would have developed 1.5 times faster than normal.

Even though the corrosion had developed deep into the airframe, the repair works that had been done were deemed inadequate, as the ground crew had only repaired the superficial parts of the skin. Areas that had been damaged deeply by the corrosion should have been cut out and replaced, but there were no signs that said procedures were followed. There were also no traces of anti-corrosion chemicals on the aircraft. This caused severe corrosion damage on the aircraft, indicated by the exfoliating corrosion found on the wreckage, which caused cracks to form due to lowered structural integrity.

=== Oversight failure ===
Findings on the investigation showed that deep cracks had been formed on the aircraft long before the accident. The aircraft was old and apparently had developed corrosion years before the crash. However, during its penultimate overhaul, the aircraft was improperly maintained and not serviced in accordance with the procedures. The insufficient periodic repairs indicated systematic problems within the oversight system of the operator, particularly with the Stavropol Airport authorities, where the aircraft was mostly based.

According to investigators, there were deficiencies in the technological documentation when performing periodic technical maintenance in terms of identifying zones of corrosion damage to the fuselage structure. Airline officials didn't find anything wrong with the aircraft, which was criticized by investigators for "not paying attention."

Moreover, the aircraft had been in service way over its lifespan limit. With the added context of the aircraft's operational history in Africa, the aircraft should've been retired, as it had exceeded its allowable lifespan. However, in 1996, the bodies overseeing the aircraft, including authorities from Antonov led by Chief Engineer Alexander Andreychuk, extended the aircraft's service life. The deficiencies in the maintenance procedures were not rectified, and during its last major overhaul, the aircraft was deemed to be airworthy.

=== Conclusion ===
The accident was blamed on sudden structural failure that had been caused by massive corrosion on the rear of the airplane which had not been properly maintained by the airline's ground crew. Investigators also noted the failure to detect corrosion during inspection, with the allowable time between inspections and maintenance being exceeded. Oversight failure to detect such deficiencies was noted as one of the main causes of the disaster.

== Aftermath ==
A criminal investigation into the crash was opened in March 2003. A total of 6 people were charged with negligence and safety rules violations, which, if found guilty, would face possible imprisonment for up to ten years in prison. Those charged include Chief Engineer Alexander Andreychuk and other officials from SAAK Airlines. The defendants pleaded not guilty and claimed that the aircraft might have been hit by a surface-to-air missile. After a year of trial, juries decided to acquit all 6 from any charges, citing "lack of relevant actual information" as the reason. The verdict was appealed by Stavropol Regional Prosecutor's Office, in which the Supreme Court of the Russian Federation decided to uphold the verdict to acquit those accused.

== See also ==
- British European Airways Flight 706
