= 1997 World Air Games =

International air sports competition

1997 World Air Games (1997 WAG) was an international competition of air sports, held between September 15–21, 1997 in Selçuk, Turkey, hosted by Turkish Aeronautical Association (THK). It was the first of World Air Games organized by Fédération Aéronautique Internationale (World Air Sports Federation - FAI) once every four years. The games marked the first time more than 3000 participants from 60 countries took part in 16 different championship categories at 7 different locations at the same time.

== Participation ==
Out of about 80 FAI members, 60 countries took part in the 1997 WAG, with 1714 athletes and 3183 participants. The list of participating countries is as follows:

Argentina	Australia	Austria	Belarus	Belgium	Brazil
Bulgaria	Canada	Chile	China	Chinese Taipei	Croatia
Cyprus	Czech Republic	Denmark	Finland	France	Germany
Greece	Guatemala	Hong Kong	Hungary	India	Indonesia
Iran	Ireland	Israel	Italy	Japan	Jordan
Kazakhstan	Latvia	Lithuania	Luxembourg	Mexico	Moldova
Mozambique	Netherlands	New Zealand	Norway	Poland	Portugal
Macedonia	Romania	Russia	Slovakia	Slovenia	South Africa
South Korea	Spain	Sweden	Switzerland	Thailand	Turkey
Ukraine	United Kingdom	United States	Uzbekistan	Venezuela	FR Yugoslavia

== Competitions ==
The first World Air Games consisted of competitions in the following categories:

=== Parachuting ===
- 1st World Parachuting Championships in Freestyle and Skysurfing
- 12th World Parachuting Championships in Formation Skydiving
- 9th World Cup of Parachuting Champions in Style and Accuracy

Competitions were held in THK Selçuk (Ephesus) Training Center near Selçuk-Ephesus. 10,408 jumps and 707 sorties have been made.

=== Air race and general aviation ===
- 10th World Air Rally Flying Championships
- 1st World Air Games Long Range Air Race
  - 1,640 flight hours were flown with 42 aircraft and 513 sorties.

=== Gliding ===
- 1st World Gliding Championship in World Class

In the part held in THK İnönü Training Center in İnönü, Eskişehir, 319 flights were flown by gliders. The aircraft made 268 sorties of retrieval with a total flight time of 83 hours. In Antalya - Karain airport 260 sorties have been made with gliders.

=== Aerobatics ===
- 7th World Glider Aerobatic Championships
- Europeans Unlimited Aerobatics Championships

Held in Antalya - Karain airport with 228 sorties.

=== Aeromodelling ===
- World Championship in Class F3B
- World Championship in Class F3C
- World Cup in Classes F1A, F1B, F1C for seniors
- European Aeromodelling Championships in Classes F1A, F1B, F1J for juniors
- European Aeromodelling Championships in Classes S1B, S3A, S5C, S6A, S7, S8E

=== Microlight ===
- 1st World Air Games Microlight Championships

Held in Aydın, with 22 hours of flight with ultralights.

=== Hang gliding ===
- 1st World Air Games Hang gliding Championships

Held in Aydın, with 53 hours of flight with powered hang gliders. In Denizli - Pamukkale, 699 flights were completed in hang gliding.

=== Paragliding ===
- 1st World Air Games Paragliding Championships

Held in Aydın, with 28 hours of flight with powered paragliders. In Denizli - Pamukkale, 1,040 flights were completed in paragliding.

=== Ballooning ===
- 1st World Air Games Ballooning Championship

Held in Cappadocia region with 868 hours balloon flight with 62 balloons and 7 hours flight time.

== Results ==
Rank	Nation	Gold	Silver	Bronze	Total
1	Russia	17	12	9	38
2	France	8	9	8	25
3	United States	8	7	4	19
4	Germany	8	6	3	17
5	Poland	5	4	5	14
6	Great Britain	5	3	5	13
7	Slovakia	4	3	5	12
8	Ukraine	3	10	5	18
9	Switzerland	3	3	1	7
10	Spain	3	2	1	6
11	Czech Republic	1	5	3	9
12	Hungary	1	2	1	4
13	Sweden	1	1	2	4
Totals (13 entries)		67	67	52	186
