= Sheremetev Sh-5 =

Sh-5

General information
- Type: Sailplane
- National origin: USSR
- Designer: Boris Nikolayevich Sheremetev

History
- First flight: 1933

The Sheremetev Sh-5 (Шереметьев Ш-5) was a two-seat sailplane designed by Boris Nikolayevich Sheremetev and produced in the Soviet Union in the 1930s. It was an unorthodox design, with a pod-and-boom layout and a cruciform tail that had its horizontal stabiliser mounted atop the boom with a large ventral fin extending below it. The monoplane wing was mounted high, on a pylon above the fuselage pod, and braced to the fuselage with V-struts. Two open cockpits were provided in tandem, with the rear cockpit located beneath the wing. The landing gear consisted of a single sprung skid under the fuselage and a small tailwheel on the ventral fin.

The Sh-5 was used to establish several records during the decade, including distance records of 60 kilometres (37 mi) and 140 kilometres (87 mi) in 1933, and an altitude record set by Dmitri Aleksandrovich Koshits in 1935. On May 11 the same year, Koshits made a long-distance flight through the Caucasus mountains in a Sh-5 towed behind a Polikarpov R-5, covering 5,025 kilometres (3,122 mi) at altitudes up to 3,200 metres (10,500 ft) in 34 hours of flight.

The Sh-5 was also produced in Turkey as an unlicensed copy by THK as the THK-9 and subsequently by MKEK as the MKEK-7 when the latter company took over the production facilities of the former in 1952.

== Specifications ==
Data from Krasil'shchikov 1991, 226

General characteristics

- Crew: Two
- Length: 7.68 m (25 ft 2 in)
- Wingspan: 16.00 m (52 ft 6 in)
- Height: 2.05 m (6 ft 9 in)
- Wing area: 22.3 m^{2} (240 sq ft)
- Empty weight: 220 kg (480 lb)
