= MKEK-4 =

MKEK-4 Uğur
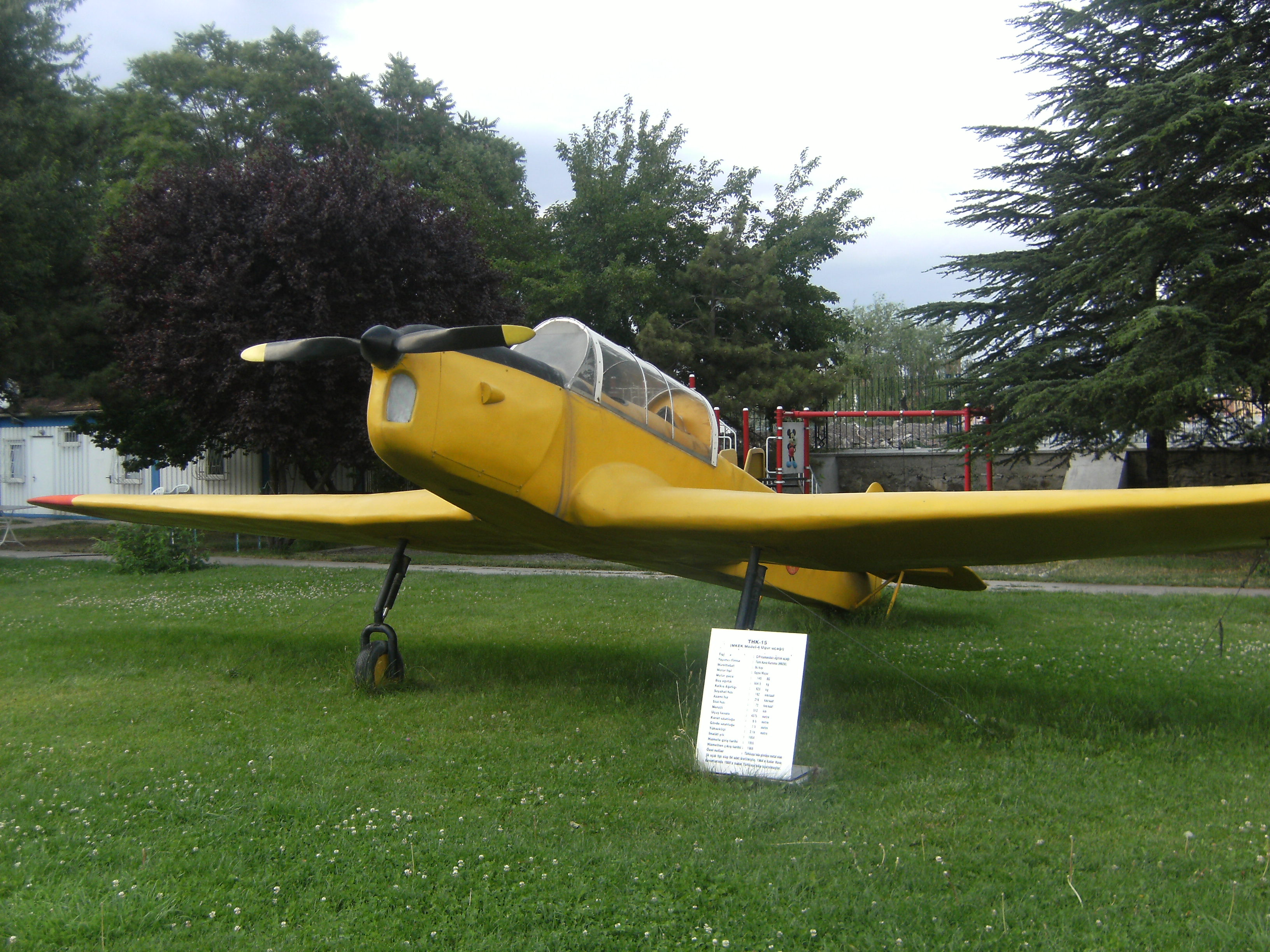

General information
- Type: Trainer
- National origin: Turkey
- Manufacturer: MKEK
- Primary users: Turkish Air Force Royal Jordanian Air Force
- Number built: 57

The MKEK-4 Uğur (Turkish: "Luck") was a basic trainer aircraft which was used by the Turkish Air Force between 1955-1963. Originally developed as the THK-15, in total 57 Uğurs were produced in Turkey, all of which were used in the Turkish AF Flight School except three which were donated to the Royal Jordanian Air Force.

== Operators ==
Jordan

- Royal Jordanian Air Force

Turkey

- Turkish Air Force

== Specifications ==
Data from Lucky or Not?, Jane's All the World's Aircraft 1958-59, Jane's All the World's Aircraft 1955-56

General characteristics

- Crew: 2
- Length: 7.50 m (24 ft 7 in)
- Wingspan: 9.50 m (31 ft 2 in)
- Height: 2.16 m (7 ft 1 in)
- Wing area: 15.9 m^{2} (171 sq ft)
- Aspect ratio: 5.7
- Airfoil: Clark YH
- Empty weight: 664.5 kg (1,465 lb)
- Gross weight: 923 kg (2,035 lb)
- Fuel capacity: 90 L (23.8 US gal; 19.8 imp gal)
- Powerplant: 1 × de Havilland Gipsy Major 4-cyl inverted air-cooled in-line piston engine, 108 kW (145 hp)
- Propellers: 2-bladed Fairey-Reed fixed-pitch metal propeller

Performance

- Maximum speed: 217 km/h (135 mph, 117 kn)
- Cruise speed: 177 km/h (110 mph, 96 kn) economical cruise

192 km/h (119 mph; 104 kn) maximum cruise

- Stall speed: 72 km/h (45 mph, 39 kn) (flaps down)
- Range: 512 km (318 mi, 276 nmi)
- Endurance: 3.25 hours
- Service ceiling: 4,575 m (15,010 ft)
- Rate of climb: 4.1 m/s (800 ft/min)
- Take-off distance to 15 m (49 ft): 335 m (1,099 ft)
- Landing distance from 15 m (49 ft): 366 m (1,201 ft)
