= THK-5 =

Twin-engine aircraft developed in Turkey

THK-5, THK-10

General information
- Type: Air ambulance and light transport
- National origin: Turkey
- Manufacturer: Turk Hava Kurumu Ucak Fabrikasi (THK)
- Number built: 13

History
- First flight: 1945

The THK-5 was a twin-engine aircraft designed by Stanisław Rogalski and built in Turkey in 1945 as an air ambulance. It was a conventional, low-wing cantilever monoplane of wooden construction throughout. The main units of the tailwheel undercarriage retracted into the wing-mounted engine nacelles and the THK-5 could carry two stretcher cases plus a medical attendant. This was followed in production by a six-seat utility transport version designated THK-5A and three examples of an improved version of the 5A designated THK-10. A single example of the type was exported, sold to Denmark.

When THK was taken over by MKEK, this was one of the designs selected for further work. However, although the designation MKEK-5 was allocated, nothing further came of this.

== Variants ==
THK-5
Air ambulance aircraft, carrying two stretcher cases plus a medical attendant.
THK-5A
6-seat utility transport
THK-10
An improved version of the THK-5A; three built.
MKEK-5
The THK-5, THK-5A and THK-10 re-designated after THK was taken over by Makina ve Kimya Endüstrisi Kurumu (MKEK), but no further development took place.

== Specifications (THK-5A) ==
Data from Jane's All the World's Aircraft 1958-59, Jane's all the World's Aircraft 1949-50

General characteristics

- Crew: 2
- Capacity: 4 pax
- Length: 10 m (32 ft 10 in)
- Wingspan: 14.64 m (48 ft 0 in)
- Height: 3.1 m (10 ft 2 in)
- Wing area: 28 m^{2} (300 sq ft)
- Aspect ratio: 7.65
- Airfoil: root: NACA 23018; tip: NACA 23012
- Empty weight: 1,450 kg (3,197 lb)
- Gross weight: 1,930 kg (4,255 lb)
- Fuel capacity: 300 L (79 US gal; 66 imp gal)
- Powerplant: 2 × de Havilland Gipsy Major 4-cylinder inverted air-cooled in-line piston engines, 97 kW (130 hp) each
- Propellers: 2-bladed MKEK wooden fixed-pitch propellers

Performance

- Maximum speed: 205 km/h (127 mph, 111 kn) at sea level
- Cruise speed: 160 km/h (99 mph, 86 kn)
- Landing speed: 120 km/h (75 mph; 65 kn)
- Stall speed: 100 km/h (62 mph, 54 kn) with flaps
- Range: 650 km (400 mi, 350 nmi)
- Service ceiling: 4,000 m (13,000 ft)
- Rate of climb: 3.2 m/s (630 ft/min)
- Wing loading: 64 kg/m^{2} (13 lb/sq ft)
- Power/mass: 9.90 kg/kW (16.28 lb/hp)
- Take-off run: 210 m (689 ft)
- Landing run: 195 m (640 ft)

== Bibliography ==
- Baljum, Preben (February 1991). "Le THK-5: L'inconnu d'Ankara" [The THK-5: The Unknown from Ankara]. Le Fana de l'Aviation (in French) (255): 20–25. ISSN 0757-4169.
