= Turkish Aeronautical Association =

Turkish non-profit organization

- Türk Hava Kurumu
- Formation: 1925; 101 years ago
- Founder: Mustafa Kemal Atatürk
- Type: Aviation
- Headquarters: Türk Hava Kurumu Genel Başkanlığı Atatürk Bulvarı No:33 06100 Opera - Ankara
- Members: FAI, IACE
- Website: www.thk.org.tr

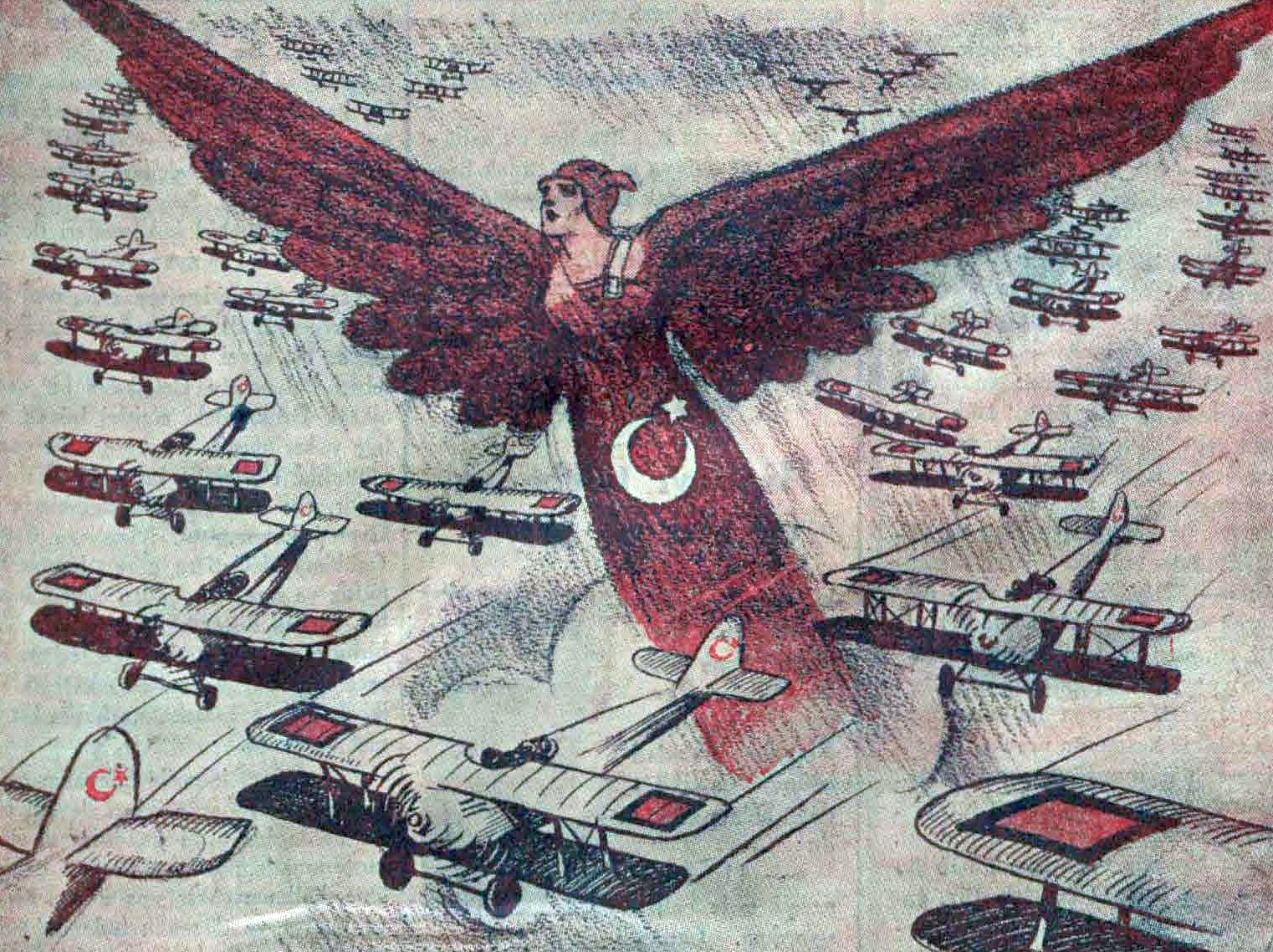
An illustration in Cumhuriyet newspaper regarding the Turkish Aeroplane League, 25 May 1935

Turkish Aeronautical Association (Turkish: Türk Hava Kurumu - THK) is a non-profit organization with an aim of increasing public awareness and participation in aviation related activities and the national body governing air sports in Turkey. The association was founded with the name Türk Tayyare Cemiyeti (Turkish Aeroplane League) by the directive of Mustafa Kemal Atatürk on February 16, 1925.

During the 1940s, it operated a factory in Ankara producing aircraft of its own design as well as under licence from British manufacturer Miles. These manufacturing facilities were purchased in 1952 by MKEK, which produced the THK-15 design in quantity under the designation MKEK-4.

THK is a member of Fédération Aéronautique Internationale (FAI) since 1929, and has been an active participant in international air sports events and championships, including the organization of the 1st World Air Games hosted by THK in 1997.

The association also participates in aerial firefighting and agricultural chemical spraying operations whilst offering aircraft maintenance to third parties.

== Training centers ==
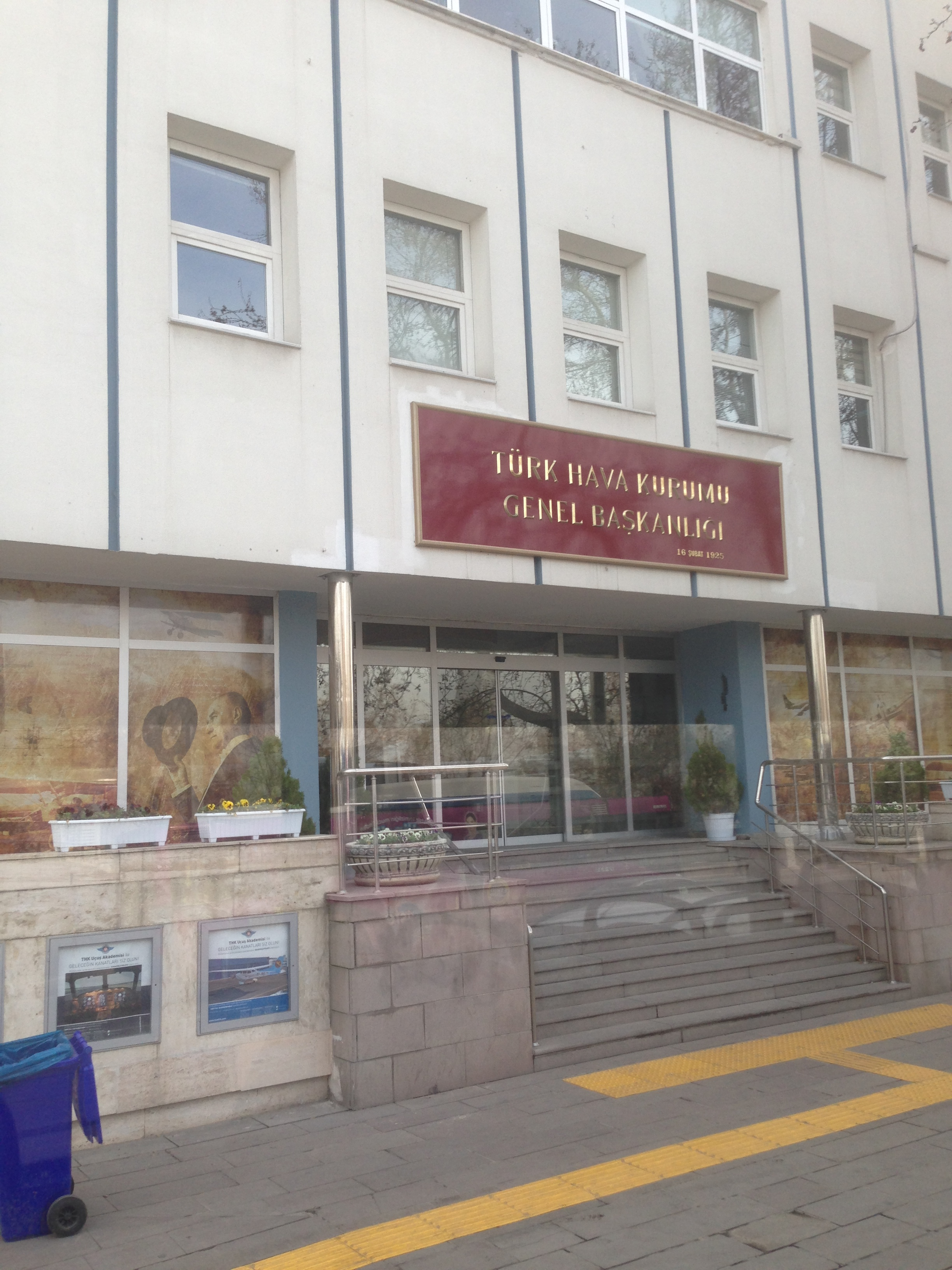
THK General Management Building

=== Türkkuşu Training Center ===
Türkkuşu Training Center in Ankara also serves as the headquarters of THK. Throughout years, Türkkuşu trained many talented aviators including Sabiha Gökçen the first female Turkish aviator.

The center offers courses on:

- Piloting
- Parachuting
- Gliding
- Flight simulation

=== İnönü Training Center ===
Located in İnönü, Eskişehir, the center runs summer courses on the following air sports activities:

- Parachuting
- Gliding
- Ballooning
- Paragliding
- Hang gliding

=== Selçuk (Ephesus) Training Center ===
This center in Selçuk, İzmir offers courses in:

- Piloting
- Gliding
- Parachuting
- Microlight training

=== Erzincan Training Center ===
Located in Erzincan, the center runs summer courses on the following air sports activities:

- Parachuting
- Gliding
- Ballooning
- Paragliding
- Hang gliding

=== Karain Training Center ===
Located in Antalya, the center runs summer courses on the following air sports activities:

- Parachuting
- Gliding
- Ballooning
- Paragliding
- Hang gliding

== Aircraft ==
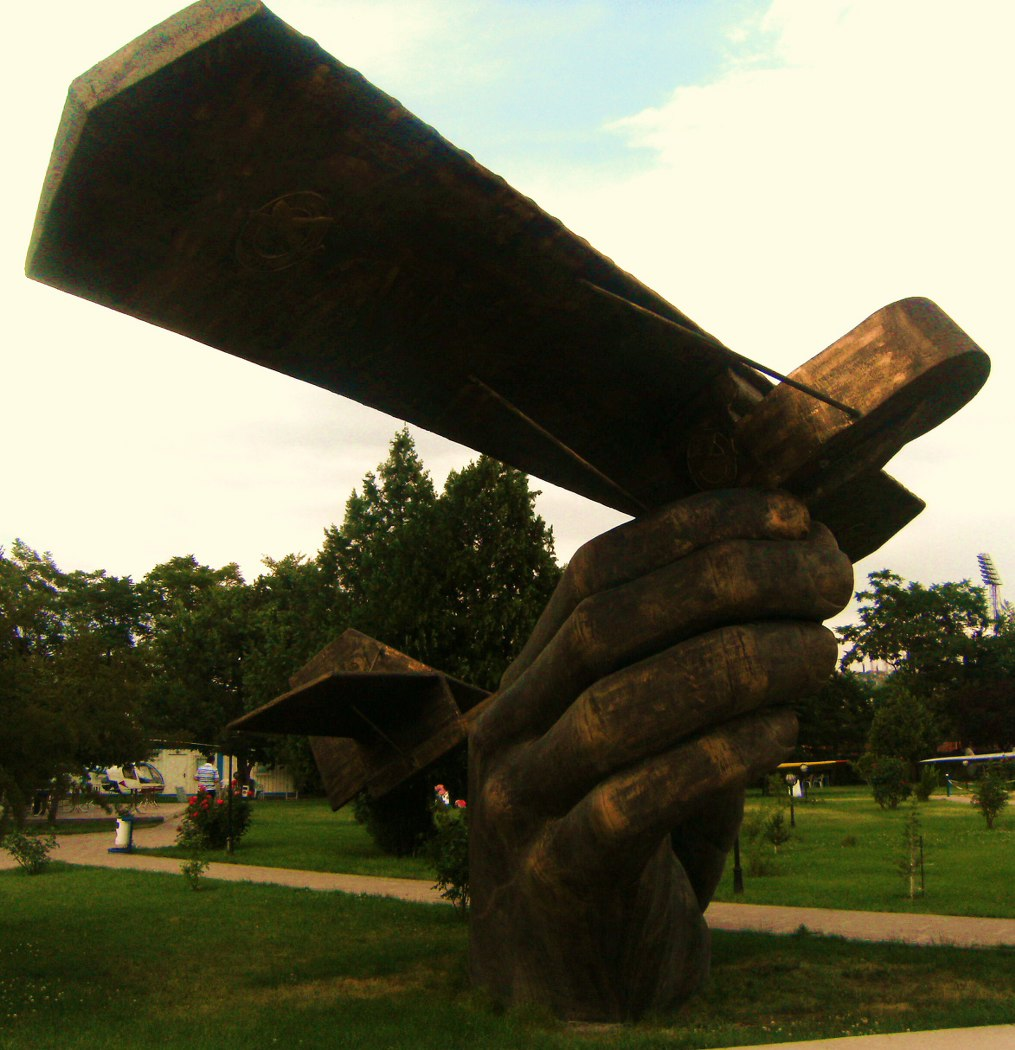
THK-4 sculpture

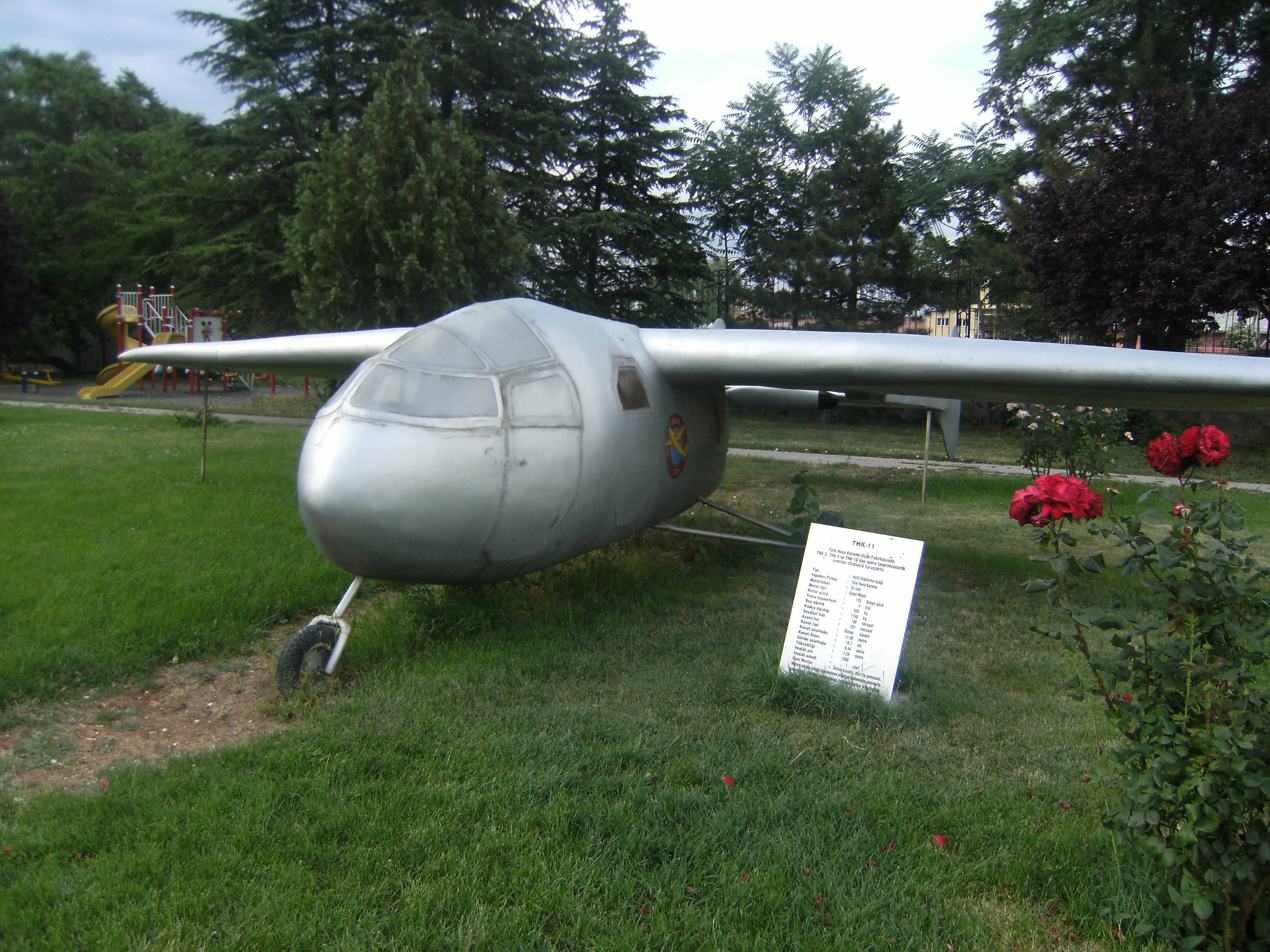
THK-11 on display

- THK-1
- THK-2
- THK-3
- THK-4
- THK-5
- THK-7
- THK-9
- THK-10
- THK-11
- THK-12
- THK-13
- THK-14
- THK-15
- THK-16 Mehmetçik
- THK-TAYSU

== See also ==
- List of firefighting equipment of Turkey
- Tayyare Apartments, redeveloped into five-star hotel in Istanbul

== Notes ==
- Gunston, Bill (1993). World Encyclopedia of Aircraft Manufacturers. Annapolis: Naval Institute Press.
