= List of equipment of the Turkish Land Forces =

Since the establishment of the Republic of Turkey the Turkish Army has used a wide range of equipment.

== Infantry equipment ==
=== Handguns ===
Model	Caliber	Origin	Details	Image
Sarsılmaz SAR 9	9×19mm Parabellum	Turkey	Primary service pistol. 180k ordered. SAR 9, SAR 9C and SAR 9 Mete variants. Based on Heckler & Koch VP9.	
Canik TP9	9×19mm Parabellum	Turkey	Secondary service pistol. 100k ordered. Mostly TP9 SF METE S variant. Based on Walther P99.	
Beretta 92	9×19mm Parabellum	Italy	92FS variant is used by Special Forces Command.	
Glock	9×19mm Parabellum	Austria	Standard sidearm of the Special Forces Command. Glock 17 and 19 variants are used.	
HK USP	.45 ACP	Germany	Used by Special Forces Command.	
SIG P226	.40 S&W	Switzerland	Both P226 and P229 are in use by Special Forces Command	
Cornershot	-	Israel	Used by the Special Forces Command	

=== Shotguns ===
Model	Caliber	Origin	Details	Images
Sarsılmaz M212	12 gauge	Turkey	Primary service shotgun. Based on Mossberg 500	
Sarsılmaz M204	12 gauge	Turkey	Secondary service shotgun. Based on Remington Model 870	
MKA 1919	12 gauge	Turkey	Used by Special Forces Command. Based on AR-15.	
Armsan RS-S1	12 gauge	Turkey	Used by the Special Forces and Commandos. Based on Saiga 12	
Armsan ARMTAC A2/A3	12 gauge	Turkey	Used by the Special Forces and Commandos. Based on Benelli M4	
Benelli M4	12 gauge	Italy	Used by the Special Forces Command.	

=== Submachine guns and personal defence weapons ===
Model	Caliber	Origin	Details	Images
HK MP5	9×19mm Parabellum	West Germany; Turkey	Primary service submachine gun. MP5A2, MP5A3, MP5SD3 and MP5K variants are in use. Produced under license by Mechanical and Chemical Industry Corporation.	
SAR 109T	9×19mm Parabellum	Turkey	Secondary service SMG. Produced by Sarsılmaz.	
Uzi	9×19mm Parabellum	Israel	Used by the Special Forces Command.	
B&T APC	9×19mm Parabellum	Switzerland	Used by the Commandos.	
HK MP7	HK 4.6×30mm	Germany	A1 variant used by the Special Forces Command.	
FN P90	FN 5.7×28mm	Belgium	Used by the Special Forces Command.	

=== Assault, battle rifles and carbines ===
Model	Caliber	Origin	Details	Images
MKE MPT	7.62×51mm NATO; 5.56×45mm NATO	Turkey	MPT-76 is the primary and MPT-55 is the secondary service rifle. Ongoing deliveries of lighter MH variant. Its produced by Kalekalıp, Sarsılmaz and MKE.	
Kale KCR	7.62×51mm NATO; 5.56×45mm NATO	Turkey	KCR-556 and KCR-762 variants are in limited use with the commandos.	
HK G3	7.62×51mm NATO	West Germany; Turkey	Former primary service/battle rifle. Conscripts and reserves field G3A7 and G3A7A1 variants. Produced under license by Mechanical and Chemical Industry Corporation.	
HK33E	5.56×45mm NATO	West Germany; Turkey	Former secondary assault rifle. Fielded by conscripts and reserves. Produced under license by Mechanical and Chemical Industry Corporation.	
HK416	5.56×45mm NATO	Germany	HK416A5 is used by the Special Forces Command.	
Steyr AUG	5.56×45mm NATO	Austria	AUG A2 variant used by the Special Forces Command.	
M4	5.56×45mm NATO	United States; Turkey	M4A1 is used by the Special Forces Command and Commando units. Also some M4 based Sarsılmaz SAR 56 and Mertsav MAR 556s.	
IWI Tavor	5.56×45mm NATO	Israel	TAR-21 is used by the Special Forces Command in VIP protection role.	

=== Sniper, designated marksman & anti-materiel rifles ===
Model	Caliber	Origin	Details	Images
MKEK JNG-90	7.62×51mm NATO	Turkey	Standard issue sniper rifle.	
KNT-76 SASS	7.62×51mm NATO	Turkey	Standard issue designated marksman rifle. Based on MPT.	
MSG90	7.62×51mm NATO	West Germany	MSG90 variant in limited use.	
SSG 3000	7.62×51mm NATO	Germany	Used by the Special Forces Command.	
M110	7.62×51mm NATO	United States	Used by the Special Forces Command.	
SR-25	7.62×51mm NATO	United States	In limited use.	
M14 EBR	7.62×51mm NATO	United States	In limited use.	
SVD	7.62×54mmR	Russia	In limited use. Mostly captured from Kurdistan Workers' Party. Some are Chinese Type 79/85, Yugoslav Zastava M91 and Romanian PSLs.	
Orsis T5000m	7.62×54mm.338 Lapua Magnum	Russia	Two bought for evaluation.	
Kale KN-12	7.62×51mm NATO; 8.59mm	Turkey	Multi-Calibre sniper rifle. In limited use.	
Remington MSR	.338 Lapua Magnum	United States	Used by the Special Forces Command.	
Arctic Warfare	.338 Lapua Magnum	United Kingdom; Turkey	AWM variant used by the Special Forces Command. Local production by Kale as KSR-338.	
Cadex CDX	.338 Lapua Magnum	Canada	CDX-33 and 40 are used by the Special Forces Command.	
Sako TRG	.338 Lapua Magnum	Finland	TRG-42 variant in limited use.	
İstiklal	.50 BMG	Azerbaijan; Turkey	Standart use Anti-materiel rifle. Mubariz variant is in local production by MKEK as MAM-15.	
Accuracy International AX50	.50 BMG	United Kingdom; Turkey	Used by the Special Forces Command. Produced under license by Kale Kalıp as KSR50.	
Barrett M82	.50 BMG	United States	M82A1 variant in used by the Special Forces Command.	
McMillan TAC-50	.50 BMG	United States	Used by the Special Forces Command.	
CheyTac Intervention	.408 Chey Tac	United States	M-310 variant in use by the Special Forces Command.	

=== Machine guns ===
Model	Caliber	Origin	Details	Images
MKEK MMT-76	7.62×51mm NATO	Turkey	MKEK-made standard issue light machine gun. Based on PKM.	
MKEK PMT-76	7.62×51mm NATO	Turkey	MKEK-made standard issue general-purpose machine gun. Based on FN MAG. Also some Sarsılmaz SAR 762 MTs.	
MG 3	7.62×51mm NATO	West Germany; Turkey	Former standard-issue GPMG. Produced under license by Mechanical and Chemical Industry Corporation.	
FN MAG	7.62×51mm NATO	Belgium	MAG 60.20 variant in limited use.	
M60	7.62×51mm NATO	United States	M60E3 variant in limited use.	
M134 Minigun	7.62×51mm NATO	United States	Installed on CH-47 Chinook and UH-60 Blackhawk helicopters.	
Kale KMG-556	5.56×45mm NATO	Turkey	Standard issue of the Special Forces Command. Developed by Kale Kalıp, based on Minimi.	
FN Minimi	5.56×45mm NATO	Belgium	Used by the Special Forces Command.	
PKM	7.62×54mmR	Soviet Union; Bulgaria; China	Bought from ex-East Germany stockpile after German reunification. Some captured from Kurdistan Workers' Party. Including Bulgarian MG-1 & MG-1Ms and Chinese Type 80s.	
Canik M2 QCB	.50 BMG	Turkey	Standard issue heavy machine gun. Based on M2. Based on M2.	
M2	.50 BMG	United States	Used with M2HB ballistic shooting platform as well.	
KPV	14.5×114mm	Soviet Union	Mostly captured from Kurdistan Workers' Party and People's Protection Units. Used in a fixed position firing platform of Nurol Tech - 'KPV 14.5'. Some are Soviet ZPUs and Chinese Type 56s.	

=== Anti-armour weapons ===
Name	Type	Origin	Details
Laser guided bombs and missiles
MAM	Laser-guided bomb	Turkey	MAM C, MAM L and MAM T are used by Uavs.
Bozok	Laser-guided bomb	Turkey	Used by Uavs.
METE	Laser-guided SSM	Turkey	Developed by Roketsan. Integrated on Aslan UGV.
Anti-tank guided missile
OMTAS	Imaging Infrared Seeker (IRR)	Turkey	Standard issue mid-range anti-tank missile. On-going deliveries.
UMTAS & L-UMTAS	IRR or Laser-guidance	Turkey	Standard issue long-range anti-tank missile.
Cirit	Laser-guided SSM	Turkey	Standard issue air-to-ground guided missile with armour-piercing, incendiary and anti-personnel capabilities. 5000+ missiles.
KARAOK	Anti-tank guided missile	Turkey	Will be a new standard lightweight anti-tank missile. 330 on order.
FGM-148 Javelin	Anti-tank guided missile	United States	Undisclosed numbers in service.
Eryx	Wire-guided missile	France; Turkey	600 launchers, 4000 missiles in service. Produced under license by Mechanical and Chemical Industry Corporation.
MILAN I/II	Wire-guided missile	France; Turkey	687+ launchers with 11250+ missiles. Produced by Roketsan.
BGM-71 TOW I/II	Wire-guided missile	United States	465+ launchers.
AGM-114K Hellfire II	Air-to-surface missile	United States	216 missiles. Used by Cobra helicopters.
9M133 Kornet	Laser-guided missile	Russia	80 launchers with 800 missiles.
Rocket-propelled grenade
HAR-66	Rocket-propelled grenade	Turkey	Standard issue portable anti-tank weapon. 40,000+ units.Produced under license by Mechanical and Chemical Industry Corporation. Turkish version of M72 LAW.
RPG-7	Rocket-propelled grenade	Soviet Union; Turkey	Bought from ex-East Germany and Socialist Bulgaria stockpile. 5,000+ units. Some captured from Kurdistan Workers' Party. Warheads (Thermobaric, Incendiary, Smoke) made locally by Mechanical and Chemical Industry Corporation / MKEK
PSRL-1	Rocket-propelled grenade	United States	Bought from United States. AR style stock attached variants in limited use by commando units.
Recoilless launcher
Carl Gustav	Recoilless rifle	Sweden	In limited use.

=== Grenade launchers ===
Model	Origin	Details
AK40-GL	Turkey	In use with MPT. Standalone version is also available.
KALE KGL40	Turkey	In limited use, mounted to KCR.
BA 40	Turkey	40mm single ambidextrous loading grenade launcher. Produced by Ata Arms and delivered by the end of 2018 to the army.
AG36	Germany	In use with HK416.
HK79	Germany	Used on G3 and HK33.
T-40	United States; Turkey	Standard issue underbarrel grenade launcher. Licensed production of M203 grenade launcher by Mechanical and Chemical Industry Corporation. Also some M320 GLM.
Mk 19	United States; Turkey	Produced by Mechanical and Chemical Industry Corporation.
MGL	South Africa; Turkey	Produced by Mechanical and Chemical Industry Corporation.
AGS-17	Soviet Union	Bought from ex-East Germany stockpile. Mounted on Otokar Engerek vehicles mostly used in Cyprus Turkish Peace Force Command.

=== Grenades and mines ===
Name	Origin	Details
MKEK CS Tear	Turkey	MOD 56 Riot; Control hand grenade
MKEK OZOK	Turkey	Domestic production stun grenade
EBK-M44	Turkey	Trigger pouch
Claymore	United States; Turkey	M18 anti-personnel mine produced under license by MKEK.
M14	United States; Turkey	Anti-personnel mine produced under license by MKEK.
M15	United States; Turkey	Anti-tank mine produced under license by MKEK.
M19	United States; Turkey	Anti-tank blast mine produced under license by MKEK.
M21	United States; Turkey	Anti-tank blast mine produced under license by MKEK.
AN/M14	United States; Turkey	Incendiary grenade produced under license by MKEK.
M18	United States; Turkey	Smoke grenade produced under license by MKEK.
M67	United States; Turkey	Hand grenade produced by MKEK.
M84	United States; Turkey	Stun grenade produced under license by MKEK.
M69	United States; Turkey	Practice grenade produced under license by MKEK.

=== Infantry mortars ===
Model	Origin	Caliber	Variant	Number	Details
Aselsan Alkar	Turkey	120mm 81mm	ALKAR integrated on Vuran	N/A	ALKAR can operate in integration with the Fire Support Command and Control System ADOP-2000. Maximum Range: 8000m
HY-12	Turkey	120mm 81mm	HY-12D; HY-12H	578	Manufactured by Mechanical and Chemical Industry Corporation. Based on MO-120 RT Modernized by Aselsan.
MKEK UT1	Turkey	81mm	GAMP; HE; ILLUM; Merlin; Smoke; Strix; WP	325	Maximum Range: 5900m Modernized by Aselsan.
MKEK NT1	Turkey	81mm	GAMP; HE; ILLUM; Merlin; Smoke; WP	325	Maximum Range: 3800m
MKEK Commando mortar	Turkey	60mm	M49 A2	N/A	Maximum Range: 1500m Modernized by Aselsan.
M19	United States; Turkey	60mm	M19T	3500	Manufactured by MKEK.
M29	United States	81mm	M29-A1; M29-E1	3175	M29-A1 and M29-E1 variants in use.
M30	United States	107mm	HE M329A1; HE M329A2; HE M34A1; WP M328A1; ILLUM M335A2	1265	5 km to 7 km effective range.
Soltam M-65	Israel	120 mm	K6	179	

=== Attire & Uniform ===
Name/Model	Details	Swatches	Image
Turkish M2008 "Nano"	Ex-standard camouflage pattern. The desert version in limited use with overseas deployment.		
Turkish M2021	Standard issue camouflage pattern of the Turkish Land Forces since 2021. Woodland and winter variants.		
Turkish MultiCam	Used by the Special Forces Command.		

=== Protective gear ===
Model	Origin	Type	Details	Images
Aselsan ZAMBAK	Turkey	Combat helmet	Ballistic helmet with capability of communication via Aselsan IC-4620 and Aselsan 6680. In limited use.	
ECH	United States; Turkey	Combat helmet	Standard issue. Local production by AFGM, ASFAT and Garanti Kompozit.	
FAST	United States; Turkey	Combat helmet	Standard issue for special forces and some commando units. Some local production by İpek Savunma and OSTİM.	
BK-4 helmet	Croatia; Turkey	Combat helmet	Standard issue for armored and mechanized corps. Local production by AFGM.	
Type III and Type IIIA ballistic vests	Turkey	Bulletproof vest	Standard issue in combat zones and on duty personnel. Produced by AFGM.	
Scalable Plate Carrier	Turkey	Plate carrier		
NBC-KET Project	Turkey	NBC suit	Jointly developed by TÜBİTAK MAM. 160.000 pieces were started to be delivered in 2013.	
NEFES CBRN Gas Mask	Turkey	CBRN gas mask	Produced by MAKSAM, also with domestic made MKE NBC Filter used by CBRN Defense Battalion Command Konya.	
MFA FM7700	Turkey	CBRN gas mask	Licensed production of Czech CM-6	
SR6M and SR10 ST	United Kingdom; Turkey	CBRN gas mask	Produced by MAKSAM. ST version is with a D12 drinking tube attached variant. Also a panoramic version.	

== Armor and artillery ==
=== Tanks ===
Main battle tanks
Model	Image	Origin	Type	Variant	Quantity	Details
Altay		Turkey	MKE L55 120 mm	T1	5	250 on order. 85 in T1 and 165 in T2 config. 1000 planned in total.
Altay		Turkey	MKE L55 120 mm	T2		250 on order. 85 in T1 and 165 in T2 config. 1000 planned in total.
Leopard 2		West Germany	120 mm L/44	2A4	310	354 units were acquired in total. 15 more for spare parts.
Leopard 2		West Germany	120 mm L/44	2A4T1	40	Upgraded to 2A4T1 standard with ERA plates.
Leopard 2		West Germany	120 mm L/44	2A4TM		Further refinement of T1 package with AKKOR active protection and EW systems. 81 on order.
Leopard 1		West Germany	105 mm L/52	A4(1T)	171	A4s were upgraded with Volkan-M fire control system to 1T standard.
Leopard 1		West Germany	105 mm L/52	A3T1	227	Upgraded with EMES-12A3 fire control system to A3T1 standard.
M60T		United States; Turkey; Israel	MKE 120 MM 44C	M60TM	165	All units will be upgraded to M60T1 standard under TIYK program.
M60 Patton		United States	105 mm M68E1 gun	M60A3 TTS	650	Roketsan developed an unmanned turret dubbed MZK for modernization.
M48 Patton		United States; Turkey	105 mm M68/T254E2 gun	A5T2	750	Upgraded along similar lines to the M60A3 with indigenous systems.

=== Artillery ===
==== Self-propelled artillery ====
Model	Image	Origin	Type	Variant	Quantity	Details
T-155 Fırtına		Turkey; South Korea	155mm	Fırtına I	280+	Produced under license by BMC. Expected delivery of Gürhan hybrid engine variant of Fırtına I SPH produced by MKE.
T-155 Fırtına		Turkey; South Korea	155mm	Fırtına II	30	140 Fırtına II ordered.
T-155 TTA		Turkey	155mm		40	Essentially modernized Panter howitzers mounted on 8x8 truck.
M52		United States; West Germany	155mm	M52T	365	All upgraded to M52T standard. Rheinmetall supplied a reworked turret with upgraded MTU diesel engines.
M44		United States; West Germany	155mm	M44T1	150	All upgraded to M44T1 standard. Rheinmetall supplied a reworked turret with upgraded MTU diesel engines.
M110		United States	203mm	M110A2	219	
==== Towed artillery ====
Model	Image	Origin	Type	Variant	Quantity	Details
MKE Boran		Turkey	105mm		120	Produced by Mechanical and Chemical Industry Corporation. Lightweight and airlift-able. 121 ordered.
M101		United States	105mm	M101A1	75	830 were bought.
M114		United States	155mm	M114A1/A2	517	535 were bought.
M115		United States	203mm		36	155 were bought.
==== Rocket artillery ====
Model	Image	Origin	Type	Variant	Quantity	Details
Multiple rocket launchers
T-107 MBRL		Turkey	107mm	TR-107; TR-107 Vuran; TR-107 Truck	100+	Produced by Roketsan. Based on Chinese Type 63. Mounted on Toyota Hilux trucks.
T-122 Sakarya		Turkey	122mm	TR-122; TRB-122; TRG-122; TRLG-122	36+	130 were bought. New deliveries ongoing.
TRG-230		Turkey	230mm	TRLG-230	n/a	
T-300 Kasırga		Turkey	300mm	TRG-300S; TRG-300E; TRG-300K	54+	Based on Chinese WS-1B.
==== Ballistic missiles ====
J-600T Yıldırım		Turkey		36		
BORA		Turkey	Block I	100+		
Tayfun		Turkey	Short-range ballistic missile	Block I - IV	1+	Deliveries ongoing.
Cenk		Turkey	Medium-range ballistic missile	Block I - II	1+	Deliveries ongoing.
==== Cruise Missiles ====
Atmaca			Anti-ship missile	K. Atmaca	1+	Deliveries ongoing.

=== Armoured fighting vehicles ===
Model	Image	Armament	Origin	Type	Variant	Quantity	Details
==== Infantry fighting vehicles ====
ACV-15		25mm SABER turret	Turkey	Tracked IFV	ACV-AIFV	511	
ACV-15		25mm NEFER turret	Turkey	Tracked IFV	ACV-AIFVT1	134	134 ACV-AIFV were upgraded ACV-AIFVT1 standard.
BMC Altuğ	-	35mm Korhan turret	Turkey	Wheeled IFV	ALTUĞ 8x8 IFV	0/29	First batch delivery of 29 vehicles are ongoing.
==== Armoured personnel carriers / Infantry mobility vehicles ====
FNSS Pars		SANCAK RCWS & 2x Karaok ATGM	Turkey	Wheeled AFV	ALPHA 8x8 AT	150+	Delivery of hundreds of vehicles under the Yeni Nesil Araç (YNA) and Özel Maksatlı Taktik Tekerlekli Zırhlı Araç (ÖMTTZA) are ongoing.
FNSS Pars		SANCAK RCWS	Turkey	Wheeled AFV	ALPHA 6x6 APC	150+	Delivery of hundreds of vehicles under the Yeni Nesil Araç (YNA) and Özel Maksatlı Taktik Tekerlekli Zırhlı Araç (ÖMTTZA) are ongoing.
FNSS Pars		SANCAK RCWS	Turkey	Wheeled AFV	ALPHA 6x6 CCV	150+	Delivery of hundreds of vehicles under the Yeni Nesil Araç (YNA) and Özel Maksatlı Taktik Tekerlekli Zırhlı Araç (ÖMTTZA) are ongoing.
FNSS Pars		SANCAK RCWS	Turkey	Wheeled AFV	ALPHA 8x8 ARV	150+	Delivery of hundreds of vehicles under the Yeni Nesil Araç (YNA) and Özel Maksatlı Taktik Tekerlekli Zırhlı Araç (ÖMTTZA) are ongoing.
FNSS Pars		SANCAK RCWS	Turkey	Wheeled AFV	PARS IV	150+	Delivery of hundreds of vehicles under the Yeni Nesil Araç (YNA) and Özel Maksatlı Taktik Tekerlekli Zırhlı Araç (ÖMTTZA) are ongoing.
FNSS Pars		SANCAK RCWS	Turkey	Wheeled AFV	PARS SCOUT	150+	Delivery of hundreds of vehicles under the Yeni Nesil Araç (YNA) and Özel Maksatlı Taktik Tekerlekli Zırhlı Araç (ÖMTTZA) are ongoing.
BMC Kirpi		SARP RCWS	Turkey	Mine-Resistant Ambush Protected Vehicle	KIRPI-I	1000	Delivery of hundreds of vehicles under the Taktik Tekerlekli Zırhlı Araçlar (TTZA) project are ongoing.
BMC Kirpi		SARP RCWS	Turkey	Mine-Resistant Ambush Protected Vehicle	KIRPI-II	1100+	Delivery of hundreds of vehicles under the Taktik Tekerlekli Zırhlı Araçlar (TTZA) project are ongoing.
BMC Vuran		SARP RCWS	Turkey	Mine-Resistant Ambush Protected Vehicle	Vuran I	600+	Delivery of hundreds of vehicles under the Taktik Tekerlekli Zırhlı Araçlar (TTZA) project are ongoing.
Nurol Ejder		SARP RCWS	Turkey	Mine-Resistant Ambush Protected Vehicle	Ejder 4x4	360+	Delivery of hundreds of vehicles under the Taktik Tekerlekli Zırhlı Araçlar (TTZA) project are ongoing.
Otokar Cobra		SARP RCWS	Turkey	Mine-Resistant Ambush Protected Vehicle	Cobra I	800+	Delivery of hundreds of vehicles under the Taktik Tekerlekli Zırhlı Araçlar (TTZA) project are ongoing.
Otokar Cobra		SARP RCWS	Turkey	Mine-Resistant Ambush Protected Vehicle	Cobra II	400+	Delivery of hundreds of vehicles under the Taktik Tekerlekli Zırhlı Araçlar (TTZA) project are ongoing.
ACV-15		General-purpose machine gun cupola	Turkey	Tracked armoured personnel carrier	ACV-AAPC	1381	
ACV-15		SANCAK RCWS	Turkey	Tracked armoured personnel carrier	ACV-AAPCT1	52	Being upgraded to AAPCT1 standard. 551 more planned.
M113		M2 Browning	United States	Tracked armoured personnel carrier	M113A1/A2	2813	Upgraded to M113T1 and T2s for various roles. Also some M577 command post carriers. Some were converted to hybrid E-ZPT.
==== Tank destroyers ====
FNSS Pars		FNSS ARCT	Turkey	Wheeled anti-tank	Pars 4x4	135+	Equipped with 9M133 Kornet and OMTAS anti-tank guided missile. Contract for Phase III vehicles was signed. On-going deliveries.
FNSS Kaplan STA		Roketsan YALMAN	Turkey	Tracked AT	KAPLAN-10	200+	Equipped with 9M133 Kornet and OMTAS anti-tank guided missile. Some vehicles are equipped with Yalman turret, which can use Cirit anti-armour missiles, OMTAS & L/UMTAS ATGMs and RCWS with 7.62mm machine gun. Contract for Phase III vehicles was signed. On-going deliveries.
FNSS ACV-15		ARCT	Turkey	Tracked AT	ACV-15-TOW	365	Equipped with BGM-71 TOW missiles.
M113		ARCT	United States; Turkey	Tracked AT	M113A2T2-TOW	156	Equipped with BGM-71 TOW missiles.
==== Mortar carriers ====
BMC Vuran		120mm 81mm	Turkey	Wheeled self-propelled mortar	Vuran Alkar	N/A	Equipped with Alkar 120mm or 81mm and have 360 degrees capability.
FNSS ACV-15		81mm	Turkey	Tracked self-propelled mortar	ACV-AMV	170	Equipped with an 81 mm mortar and a 7.62 mm machine gun.
M125		81mm	United States	Tracked self-propelled mortar	M125A1	10	Equipped with 81 mm M29 mortar.
M106		107mm	United States	Tracked self-propelled mortar	M106A1	179	Equipped with 107 mm M30 mortar.

== Auxiliary vehicles ==
=== Engineering vehicles and equipment ===
Name	Origin	Type	Quantity	Details
FNSS Kunduz	Turkey	Armored bulldozer	12	A Turkish license built variant of the American M9 ACE.
TOSUN	Turkey	Armored bulldozer	100+	Built to withstand against IED and other threats of high level terror zones at Turkish Border. most of vehicles equipped with KORALP RCWS (Remote Controlled Weapon Station).
MEMATT	Turkey	Demining vehicle	6	Unmanned demining vehicle
Božena 5	Slovakia	Demining vehicle	N/A	Unmanned
Husky VMMD	South Africa	Demining vehicle	4	2 - 2G Mounted Mine Detection System Variant and 2 R-Visor Talon remote controlled mine detection robots supported variant in service.
FNSS Samur	Turkey	Armoured vehicle-launched bridge	52	With 50 more on order.
Leguan	West Germany	Armoured vehicle-launched bridge	36	Bought from the German Bundeswehr in 2008.
M48 AVLB	United States; West Germany	Armoured vehicle-launched bridge	70	On M48 Patton chassis.
KNDS (WFEL) DSB Dry Support Bridge	European Union	Armoured vehicle-launched bridge	2	2 Systems (3 carrier vehicles/3 trailers. Carrier vehicle is Oshkosh M1975 6x6 ARFF. 40-meter bridge set)
Bergepanzer 2	Germany	Armoured recovery vehicle	12	On Leopard 1 chassis.
M48A5T5 Tamay	United States; Turkey	Armoured recovery vehicle	105	On M48 Patton chassis.
M88A1	United States	Armoured recovery vehicle	33	On M60 Patton chassis.
MPG M4K	Turkey	Armoured recovery vehicle	62	Mine-resistant
POYRAZ	Turkey	Ammunition resupply vehicle	71	Based on K10 ammunition resupply vehicle.
YENER	Turkey	Mine/EOD detection vehicle	1	Based on Otokar Arma.
MKEK TAMKAR	Turkey	Mine-clearing line charge	N/A	MKEK TAMKAR is carried on a trailer. It can clear 100 m long and 10 m wide areas with a depth of up to 1 metres. The system can be installed on armoured vehicles with small modifications. Tamkar is tracked with FNSS ACV-15 mounted on trailer.
MKE TAMGEÇ	Turkey	Mine-clearing line charge	N/A	MKE TAMGEÇ was developed for infantry troops. It was designed to be transported by troops.
BMC METI	Turkey	Mine and Handmade Explosive Detection Vehicle	32	Based on BMC Kirpi, developed for IED disposal teams.
ETMTS-2	Turkey	Hand-held mine detection system	N/A	Sensors; EMI (Electromagnetic Induction) Sensor; GPR (Ground Penetrating Radar) Sensor; Used by explosive ordnance disposal teams
ETMTS-3 (ALPER)	Turkey	Hand-held mine detection system	N/A	Warning signals: Audio (with headset or internal speaker); Visual (LCD screen); Vibration
OZAN	Turkey	Foldable metal mine detector	N/A	
IND MTC 60	Turkey	Mobile crane	8	Developed by İndeks.60 ton mobile cranes.
IND MC 60	Turkey	Mobile crane	N/A	Developed by İndeks.60 ton mobile cranes.
Tunnel Boring Machine	Turkey	Tunnel Boring Machine	1	

=== Utility vehicles ===
Name	Type	Origin	Quantity	Details
Toyota Hilux	MLUV	Japan	N/A	KÜSS-Truck-mounted weapon system : Integrated CİRİT anti-armour missiles developed by Roketsan and KARAKURT EO/IR system with laser pointer developed by Aselsan.
Otokar Engerek	MLUV	United Kingdom; Turkey	2,550	Based on Land Rover Defender 110 - RSOV. In service with different variants such as anti-tank, grenade launcher, mortar carrier & heavy MG.
Land Rover Defender	MLUV	United Kingdom; Turkey	9,800	Produced under license by Otokar. Used by all armed forces branches. Some are being converted to electric drive.
Jeep Wrangler	MLUV	United States; Turkey	5,700	Produced under license by Otokar. Used by all armed forces branches.
HMMWV	MLUV	United States	N/A	AN/TPQ-36 Firefinder radar carrier model in use.
Best Grup Armored Ambulance	Armoured ambulance	Turkey	x	
İndeks IND KM 800	Snowmobile	Turkey	79	
İndeks UTV KM 800	UTV	Turkey	36	
Various ATV	UTV	Turkey		
Polaris RZR	UTV	Turkey	x	MRZR-D2 variant in use. Both in wheeled and tracked config.

=== Cargo vehicles ===
Name	Origin	Type	Quantity	Details
Koluman Derman	Turkey	Very heavy tactical wheeled vehicle (20,000 kg)	29	41 on order. To be supplied within the scope of the project : Deliveries of 70 Vehicles, 70 Container Transport Platforms, 195 1CC 20 Feet Containers and 40 ACV/APC Transport Platforms are targeted.
Anadolu Isuzu Seyit	Turkey	Very heavy tactical wheeled vehicle (19,000 kg)	N/A	Armored truck configured mainly for vehicle recovery. Also some Aselsan EIRS radar integrated variant entered the inventory in 2021.
Palletized Load System	United States	Very heavy tactical wheeled vehicle (16,500 kg)	N/A	
HEMTT	United States	Very heavy tactical wheeled vehicle (12,000 kg)	80	
MAN LX and FX	Germany; Turkey	Heavy tactical wheeled vehicle (5–10,000 kg)	N/A	Manufactured by MAN Türkiye A.Ş.
BMC 380-26 Z	Turkey	Heavy tactical wheeled vehicle (10,000 kg)	403	Mine resistant armored truck. 26-ton class 6x6 truck designed to transport cargo and personnel of up to 10-ton payloads in NATO standards.
BMC Fatih 280	Turkey	Heavy tactical wheeled vehicle (8,000 kg)	575	
BMC 235-16 P	Turkey	Heavy tactical wheeled vehicle (5,000 kg)	282	16-ton class 4x4 (or 4x2)
BMC 185-09 B	Turkey	Medium tactical wheeled vehicle (2,500 kg)	706	Also known as BMC EFE mine resistant armored truck. 10-ton class 4x4 (or 4x2) with additional front pull rope.
Mercedes Unimog	Germany; Turkey	Medium tactical wheeled vehicle (2,500 kg)	5,500	Produced by [ [Mercedes-Benz Türk] ]. 478 more on order.
Mercedes-Benz Zetros	Germany; Turkey	Medium tactical wheeled vehicle (2,500 kg)	N/A	Produced by Mercedes-Benz Türk. Used the Transporter erector launcher of HISAR.
Mercedes-Benz Actros	Germany; Turkey	Heavy-duty truck	380	Produced by Mercedes-Benz Türk. MP1, MP2, Water Tanker and NG tank transporters variants in use.
Mercedes-Benz Axor	Germany; Turkey	Heavy-duty truck	140	Produced by Mercedes-Benz Türk.
Mercedes-Benz NG	Germany; Turkey	Heavy-duty truck	N/A	Produced by Mercedes-Benz Türk. Used mostly as tank transporter.
Scania HEMA R420	Turkey; Sweden	Heavy-duty truck	45	Produced by Scania Türkiye. Used mostly as tank transporter.
Koluman PTA	Turkey	Medium-duty truck	300	
BMC TUĞRA	Turkey	Very heavy tank transporter (70,000 kg)	72	The delivery of 72 pieces was made at the end of 2019. BMC TUĞRA with its 8×8 tractor and lowbed delivered to the Land forces.
MZKT VOLAT-74295	Belarus; Russia	Very heavy tank transporter (50,000 kg)	130	Turkish Army ordered a total of 130 MZKT VOLAT-74295 between 1998 and 2000 In addition to the trade agreement with Russia. All modernized with Mercedes-Benz Turkey diesel engines, developing to 500 hp.
BMC AKTAN	Turkey	Fuel tanker truck	N/A	AKTAN can carry 12,000 litres of fuel. The vehicle can both pump the fuel in its tank into the recipient air platform, and can also pump fuel out of a tank on another vehicle and pump it to a different point. The vehicle is capable of refuelling up to four aircraft, either simultaneously or separately.
BMC Water Tanker	Turkey	Water tanker truck	N/A	The BMC Water Tanker has a tanker with a capacity of 20,000 lt and a maximum loaded weight of 32,000 kg. The BMC Water Tanker (8x2), can a speed of 114 km per hour.

=== Unmanned ground vehicles ===
Name	Type	Details
KAPLAN	Light-class Unmanned ground vehicle	KAPLAN unmanned ground vehicle family is the new generation multi-purpose product family based on a rugged high-mobility vehicle platform and a modular operator control unit. The KAPLAN unmanned ground vehicle family can be equipped with various mission specific payload kits and a unique structure providing seamless interoperability.
Elektroland TMR-I & II	Light-class Unmanned ground vehicle	Elektroland TMR is an EOD crawler UGV used by EOD units of Turkish Land Forces. Various variants in use. There are two types of TMR-I robots which are called Zafer and Dinçer, while TMR-II robot is named Kutlu.
Elektroland Minirov	Light-class Unmanned ground vehicle	Elektroland Minirov is an EOD wheeled UGV used by EOD units of Turkish Land Forces. It has 6 wheels and a load carrying capacity of 15 kg.
ERTUĞRUL	Light-class Unmanned ground vehicle	Developed by Aselsan ERTUĞRUL is bomb disposal robot.
ACROB	Light-class Unmanned ground vehicle	ACROB light class unmanned ground vehicles developed with domestic facilities are on duty as little assistants of security forces in reconnaissance/surveillance with 3 cameras, speed and agility in all weather and terrain conditions, in different visibility conditions.
KOMODO	Light-class Unmanned ground vehicle	KOMODO it is an Unmanned Ground Vehicle used day and night for the purpose of reconnaissance, surveillance and intervention in multi-storey building, wide field operations.
UKAP	Medium-class Unmanned ground vehicle	Weapon Platform (UKAP), developed by defense contractors Katmerciler and Aselsan.
BARKAN I/II	Medium-class Unmanned ground vehicle	It is equipped with a Remote Controlled Weapon System, electro-optical sensors and many link systems. In addition, BARKAN UGV will operate jointly with the unmanned aerial vehicle.
ASLAN	Medium-class Unmanned ground vehicle	ASLAN UGV performs autonomous missions with the ASELSAN SERÇE UAV system. As a weapon system in the delivered Aslan SRV systems, there is the SARP-L RCWS developed by ASELSAN. Integrated METE Laser guided mini missile system. Integrated Tepegöz tethered persistent surveillance system and AVAZ sonic weapon.
HANÇER	Medium-class Unmanned ground vehicle	Developed by Elektroland Defence. It can be integrated weapon, it is suitable for harsh terrain conditions, has long operation time, mast, lighting system, etc., can be mounted on it.
BOĞAÇ	Medium-class Unmanned ground vehicle	Developed by Elektroland Defence. A design that meets all needs with its hybrid structure and autonomous features with both electric and hydraulic motors. On order.
Shadow Rider(Gölge Süvari)	Heavy class Unmanned ground vehicle	Developed by FNSS the Shadow Rider is built on the M113 platform, it has remote command and autonomous capabilities. At least 5 in service.

== Air defence systems ==
=== Anti-aircraft systems ===
Name	Origin	Type	Quantity	Details
Surface-to-air missile systems
Siper Block 1		Long-range and high-altitude SAM	N/A	A standard battery of a Siper Block 1 system consists of 14 vehicles. It was stated that the Siper Block 1 radar can detect enemy elements at a range of 500–600 km.
HISAR O+	Turkey	Medium-range SAM	N/A	The HİSAR-O+ system has 18 (3 shooter vehicles) interceptor missiles at the battery level and 54 (9 shooter vehicles) interceptor missiles at the battalion level as standard. More than 4 batteries are in use. On going deliveries. Additional deliveries are planned between 2025 and 2028. Part of Steel Dome multi-layered air defence system.
HISAR A+	Turkey	Short-range SAM	N/A	The Autonomous Low Altitude Air Defence Missile System (Autonomous HİSAR A+) with the Self-Propelled Motor. Additional deliveries are planned between 2025 and 2028. Part of Steel Dome.
ATILGAN PMSS	Turkey	Short-range SAM	70	Stinger launch platform. Mounted on M113, ACV-15 and ACV-30.
Zıpkın PMADS	Turkey	Short-range SAM	35	Stinger launch platform. Mounted mostly on Range Rover Defenders and also on other wheeled utility vehicles.
BMC Vuran	Turkey	Short-range SAM	Dozens	Equipped with Sungur missiles.
Anti-Aircraft Guns
ACV-30 Korkut	Turkey	Self-propelled anti-aircraft gun	14 batteries	Deliveries are ongoing. Each Korkut system compromises of 1 command and control vehicle and 3 weapons platforms. 14 batteries, which include 42 weapon system vehicles (SSA) and 14 combat system control vehicles (CCA). Part of Steel Dome.
L/60 and L/70 Bofors	Sweden; Turkey	Anti-aircraft autocannon	803	Locally produced. L/60 and L/70; L/60 and L/70 variants modernised with Aselsan radar capabilities.
Oerlikon GDF	Switzerland; Turkey	Anti-aircraft autocannon	120	Locally produced version of Oerlikon 35 mm twin gun known as MKEK GDF-003B. GDF-003Bs were upgraded to GDF-003B Modernized with Aselsan made Fire and Command Control System. Part of Steel Dome.
Oerlikon 20 mm	Switzerland; Turkey	Anti-aircraft autocannon	439	Locally produced. FFS variant modernised with Aselsan radar capabilities.
Rheinmetall 20 mm	West Germany; Turkey	Anti-aircraft autocannon	300	Locally produced. Zwillingsflak variant modernised with Aselsan radar capabilities.
M45 Quadmount	United States	Anti-aircraft gun	160	All 160 M45s modernized with new powerful generator and usually mounted on the top of M113T1-2 vehicles. The rest outsite 160 units are used for ground support in bases with M55

=== Man-portable air-defense system (MANPADS) ===
Name	Origin	Details
Sungur	Turkey	Developed by Roketsan. Has two PORSAV missile launcher pods.
FIM-92A/C Stinger	United States; Turkey	Standard issue man-portable air-defense system. FIM-92A - 150 launchers and 439 missiles. FIM-92C - 800+ launchers and 4800+ missiles. Produced under license by ROKETSAN. Modernized with Aselsan IFF Mode 5 Manpad Portable Interrogator; Mode 5: military only; provides a cryptographically secured version of Mode S and Automatic Dependent Surveillance–Broadcast Global Positioning System position.

=== Anti-drone systems ===
Name	Type	Details
İHASAVARTM	Anti-Drone RF Jamming / Blurring System	İHASAVARTM Anti-Drone RF Jamming and Blinding System provides protection by preventing drone/mini-UAV flying with active jamming application near military facilities/bases, government institution buildings, senior authorized residences, ceremonial areas, security and control points.
Kapan	Anti-Drone System	Developed by METEKSAN Defense, KAPAN Anti-Drone System offers superior drone detection and tracking performance with its radar system and thermal/daytime cameras, while also enabling the destruction of drones with its RF jammer and optional laser system.
Şahin 40mm	Physical Destruction System	Developed by ASELSAN, the ŞAHİN 40mm Physical Destruction System was developed for the Turkish Armed Forces in order to defend critical facilities against rotary and fixed-wing Mini/Micro UAVs and to ensure border security.
Aselsan IHTAR	Anti-Drone Interception System	IHTAR allows public areas and commercial zones to be protected against illegal activities of micro- and mini-sized UAVs. IHTAR Mini/Micro UAV Interception System, which was designed to perform its activities reliably under difficult working conditions, was put into service of the security forces, public and commercial areas.
İLTER	Drone Detection and Neutralization system	İLTER Drone/UAV Detection and Neutralization System 90.45% domestic production of Boğaziçi Defence Technologies consist of RF and radar based drone detection and suppression system with a full automatic detecting, jamming and spoofing capability against drones/UAVs operating autonomously without any transmission and using ISM bands to communicate with their remote controllers.
FALCON-DAD	Drone hunter drone	Developed by Altınay Defence(Dasal). On order.

=== Air Defence Early Warning and Command Control system ===
Name	Origin	Variant	Details
HERIKKS	Turkey	HERIKKS HERIKKS-VI	Developed by ASELSAN, HERIKKS creates a real-time aerial picture by combining the information received from air defense radars and ensures the most appropriate target-weapon allocations with the Threat Assessment and Weapon Allocation algorithm.

== Radar and electronic warfare systems ==
=== Radar ===
These are radars in Turkish Land Forces command. For other radars see List of equipment of the Turkish Air Force.

Name	Type	Details
ACAR	Ground surveillance radar	
Air Defense Fire Control System	Air Defence and Fire Control radar	Produced by Aselsan
Aselsan MAR	Mobile short range search radar	Used by Hisar A+ air defence system and Korkut anti-aircraft gun.
KALKAN-400G	Mobile medium range search radar	Can detect air targets in the most accurate and fast way in order to protect critical military and civilian facilities.
Aselsan ALP-700G (SURALP)	Weapon detection radar	ASELSAN Weapon Detection Radar is a high-tech radar system that detects mortar, artillery and rocket fires by enemy elements and precisely calculates the drop and drop location.
SERHAT	Counter-mortar/UAV radar	Mounted on Cobra
SERHAT II	Counter-mortar/UAV radar	Mounted on Cobra II.
SERHAT-DUAL	Counter-mortar/UAV radar	New variant of the SERHAT radar which is effective against mortars, artillery, rockets and mini-micro UAVs.
Meteksan Mildar	Fire control radar	Developed by Meteksan Defense, MİLDAR is capable of automatic scanning, detection and classification for multiple ground and air targets in all weather conditions.
Meteksan Retinar FAR-AD	Drone detection radar	Retinar FAR-AD Drone Detection Radar developed by Meteksan Defense; It is a completely domestically and nationally developed radar system against mini/micro unmanned aerial vehicles and threats from land
AN/TPQ-36	Firefinder weapon locating radar	Produced under license by Aselsan
AN/TPQ-37	Firefinder weapon locating radar	Produced under license by Aselsan
Beagle	Portable Ground Surveillance radar	
COBRA	Counter-battery radar	
EL/M-2226	Over-the-horizon radar	

=== Electronic warfare ===
Name	Description
MILKAR 3A3(ILGAR)	MİLKAR-3A3 Mobile V/UHF Electronic Attack System, developed by ASELSAN, has been developed for the purpose of applying Electronic Attack (ET) to target communication systems communicating in V/UHF frequency band on different platforms.
MILKAR 4A2(SANCAK)	The New Generation Combat Electronic Attack System named SANCAK is thought to be the new name of the MİLKAR-4A2 High Frequency (HF) Jamming System developed by ASELSAN. On-going deliveries
MILKAR 5A5	Backpack Type RF Blurring / Mixing Systems and Vehicle Type Active and Reactive RF Blanking / Mixing Systems. Variants : 5A,5A2,5A3,5A4,5A5.
REDET II(VURAL)	Mobile radar electronic support/Electronic attack system
KORAL Electronic Warfare System	Electronic support systems and one electronic attack system, 200 km range
Aselsan Compact Mobile ESM/ELINT System	Electronic signals intelligence system.
Aselsan Man-Pack ESM/ELINT System ARES-2LC/T	Manpack electronic signals intelligence system.
Aselsan PUHU	The PUHU Manpack Direction Finding (DF) System has been developed by Aselsan to support tactical combat units in operational areas.
Aselsan PUHU 3-LT	Electronic attack system integrated on Otokar Arma 6x6 vehicle.
Aselsan Sökmen v3	Electronic defence system. To be delivered.
Aselsan Sökmen v2	Expected.
Aselsan SAPAN	Programmable Reactive RCIED Jammer System
Aselsan EJDERHA (HPEM)	Anti-IED solution HPEM stands for High Power Electromagnetics System
Aselsan Gergedan	Portable RCIED Jammer System (Mobile)
Aselsan Kangal	Jammer System
Aselsan Kirpi	Manpack RCIED Jammer System. HB and LB variants.
Aselsan Rakas and Mukas	Communication electronic warfare training system. Radar Jamming and Deception Simulator (RAKAS) and Communication Jamming and Deception Simulator (MUKAS).
Aselsan Opkar	OPKAR are portable systems designed to confuse or weaken threat communication elements and can be used in operations by creating a mesh network structure.
Aselsan SEDA	SEDA (Shot Detection and Localization System) is an acoustic gunfire detection system designed to identify the source location of gunfire. Mounted on Kirpi MRAPs.
HAVELSAN Technology Radar (HTR) Erisis	Early Warning System.
TASMUS	Aselsan Tactical Area Communications System
Meteksan Mert and Merter	Portable Electronic Attack System is an Electronic Warfare (EW) system used in V/UHF frequency bands to prevent long-distance communication of target elements.

=== Directed-energy weapons ===
Name	Origin	Type	Details
ALKA DEWS	Turkey	Directed-energy weapon/Counter unmanned air system	ALKA directed energy weapon system neutralizes or totally destructs targets such as Improvised Explosive Devices (IED), mini/micro unmanned aerial vehicles, drones, mini/micro unmanned aerial vehicles (UAV) carrying a variety of payloads (camera, explosives, etc.) as well as swarm attacks.
ARMOL	Turkey	Directed-energy weapon/Counter unmanned air system	ARMOL, which was developed as a sub-work package of the IŞIN Project, was integrated into Otokar's Cobra-1 vehicle.

== Aircraft ==
=== Unmanned aerial vehicles ===
Name	Origin	Type	Details
Unmanned combat aerial vehicles
Bayraktar TB2	Turkey	UCAV	200+ are in service. Integrated with ANTIDOT 2-U electronic warfare pod.
Bayraktar Akıncı	Turkey	UCAV	8 AKINCI-A and some B variants in service.
Bayraktar TB3	Turkey	UCAV	Deliveries on going.On order
Asisguard Songar	Turkey	mini-UCAV	Undisclosed numbers in service. Variants; Songar MG; Songar MG GL (T-40 integrated variant ); Songar AK40-GL : Has 4 grenade launchers jointly developed with Akdaş.; Songar Togan : Air-to-surface launched 81 mm mortar munition integrated variant jointly developed with TUBITAK-SAGE.; Songar APC : Mounted on BMC Amazon vehicle.
STM Boyga	Turkey	mini-UCAV	BOYGA, the latest member of STM's tactical mini UAV product family, drops the customized, 81 mm mortar ammunition produced by MKE on the target with a precise hit thanks to its improved ballistic estimation algorithm.
Cankut-1	Turkey	mini-UCAV	Developed by MAdoors and can be equipped with automatic machine gun or grenade launcher.
Reconnaissance/Surveillance/Transport
Bayraktar Gözcü	Turkey	Miniature UAV	20 units of the unmanned aerial vehicle produced by the Kale-Baykar partnership, were delivered to the Turkish Armed Forces.
Bayraktar Mini	Turkey	Miniature UAV	Block A and Block B variants in use.
STM Togan	Turkey	Miniature UAV	Designed to be used in tactical level reconnaissance, surveillance and intelligence missions, TOGAN has a unique flight control system and mission planning software.
Serçe 1-3	Turkey	Miniature UAV	Multi-rotor unmanned flying system. Serçe 1 and 3 variants in use.
Aselsan ARI 1-T	Turkey	Miniature UAV	Used by artillery units, base areas and outpost defenses.
BAHA	Turkey	VTOL Cargo UAV	Developed by Havelsan.
Bulut	Turkey	VTOL Cargo UAV	Developed by Havelsan.
ALPİN	Turkey	VTOL Cargo UAV	Developed by Titra Technology. It can carry 200 kg payload.
PUHU 75	Turkey	VTOL Cargo UAV	Developed by Altınay Defence(Dasal). On order.
OTONOM TETRON	Turkey	Wired drone	Uninterrupted flight, secure communication, wired drone systems capable of performing tasks without GPS signals entered the inventory of security forces.
Aselsan Karagöz	Turkey	Airborne ground surveillance zeppelin	The Karagöz System, one of Aselsan's Balloon Surveillance System Product Family its used for border security purposes.
AeroVironment RQ-20 Puma	United States; Turkey	Miniature UAV	Puma 3 AE variant in use. Produced under license by ALTOY. In use by Special Forces Command.
Black Hornet Nano	Norway	Micro unmanned aerial vehicle	PD-100 Black Hornet variant in use by Special Forces Command and explosive ordnance disposal units.
Loitering munitions
STM Kargu	Turkey	Kamikaze drone	Also can be used as a miniature UAV. It is stated that close to 5000 units are produced for Turkish Security Forces, Friend and Allied countries. Expected variants with armour-piercing warhead and RF seeker to enter in inventory.
TAI Şimşek	Turkey	Kamikaze drone	ŞİMŞEK (Thunder) originally intended as High Speed Target Drone System but now also configured as a Kamikaze drone, it was initiated in 2009. There is also smaller versions of TAI ŞİMŞEK.
BAZNA	Turkey	Kamikaze drone	New type of kamikaze drone developed by DÖNMEZOĞLU BİLİŞİM is in service.
MİKON	Turkey	Kamikaze drone	Developed by DASAL to Special Forces Command.
YIHA-III	Turkey	Kamikaze drone	A jointly developed Turkish-Pakistani loitering munition by Baykar and NASTP.
Target drones
TAI Turna	Turkey	Target drone	TURNA (Crane) Target Drone Systems program was initiated in 1995. Entered the inventory of TAF in 2001.
Meggitt Banshee	United Kingdom	Target drone	Undisclosed numbers are in service.

=== Helicopters ===
Name	Image	Origin	Type	Variant	Quantity	Details
Attack helicopter
TAI/Agusta Westland T129 ATAK		Turkey; Italy	Armed reconnaissance	T-129A	9	Produced by Turkish Aerospace Industries. 32 on order.
TAI/Agusta Westland T129 ATAK		Turkey; Italy	Armed reconnaissance	T-129B	49	Produced by Turkish Aerospace Industries. 32 on order.
Utility/Transport
Eurocopter AS532 Cougar		France	Utility / CSAR	UL	27	MkII variant in use. All modernized.
Sikorsky S-70 Black Hawk		United States; Turkey	Utility / CSAR	S-70A-28D	48	17 T-70 on order. Produced under license by TAI. Used by Land Forces and Special Forces Command. Under project Yarasa(Bat), all analogue S-70A helicopters were upgraded to S-70A-28D standard by TAI and ASELSAN. Five D-models were converted to combat search and rescue (CSAR) standard and are designated S-70A-28DSAR.
Sikorsky S-70 Black Hawk		United States; Turkey	Utility / CSAR	T-70	16	17 T-70 on order. Produced under license by TAI. Used by Land Forces and Special Forces Command. Under project Yarasa(Bat), all analogue S-70A helicopters were upgraded to S-70A-28D standard by TAI and ASELSAN. Five D-models were converted to combat search and rescue (CSAR) standard and are designated S-70A-28DSAR.
Boeing CH-47 Chinook		United States; Turkey	Heavy-lift transport	CH-47F	10	Used by Land Forces and Special Forces. 1 crashed in 2026
Bell UH1 Iroquois		United States; Turkey	Utility	UH-1H	86	Some underwent avionics modernization. Will gradually be retired until 2033.
Bell 205		United States; Turkey	Utility	Bell 205A	68	Some underwent avionics modernization. Will gradually be retired until 2033.
TAI T625 Gökbey		Turkey	Utility		1	15 on order.
AgustaWestland AW119 Kola		Italy	Utility	AW119T	6	Also used for training
Training
Bell 206 JetRanger		United States	Trainer helicopter	AB206R	22	AB206B-3 and AB206R variants in use.

=== Fixed-wing aircraft ===
Name	Image	Origin	Type	Variant	Quantity	Details
Reconnaissance
Beechcraft Super King Air		United States	ISTAR	350	8	
Transport
Beechcraft Super King Air		United States	Tactical transport	200	4	Two of them underwent avionics modernization.
Cessna 421 Golden Eagle		United States	Tactical transport	421B	3	
Beechcraft Baron		United States	Tactical transport	T-42A	5	

== Future procurement ==
=== Land Systems ===
- New Armoured Vehicle Project (Yeni Nesil Araç, YNA): The Turkish Land Forces Command plans to procure tactical wheeled vehicles with increased armor protection and mobility, equipped with advanced command and control systems, capable of detecting the enemy from maximum distances and engaging them with appropriate weapon systems via automatic firing systems, and possessing active and passive protection systems. Within the scope of the YNA (Yield-Processing Vehicle) Projects, vehicles in the following configurations will be added to the inventory: 8x8 YNA with a 35 mm turret, 8x8 YNA with an anti-tank turret, 8x8 mobile repair vehicle, and 6x6 command post vehicle.
- Tactical Wheeled Armored Vehicles Project (Taktik Tekerlekli Zırhlı Araçlar, TTZA): Vehicles procured under the TTZA Projects, provide high protection against mine and ballistic threats thanks to their armored cabins and windows. Furthermore, their 4x4 drive system offers high mobility in all types of terrain and climate conditions. The vehicles are also equipped with numerous mission-related features such as a Remote Controlled Weapon System, vision systems, automatic fire extinguishing system, central tire inflation system, run-flat tires, jamming and blinding system, and CBRN protection system. Vehicles in different configurations have been supplied according to user profiles and mission concepts.
- Special Purpose Tactical Wheeled Armored Vehicles Project (Özel Maksatlı Taktik Tekerlekli Zırhlı Araçlar Projesi, ÖMTTZA): Within the scope of the project signed between the Presidency of Defence Industries and FNSS Defence Systems Inc. on April 4, 2019, the design, testing, and production of a total of 100 8x8 and 6x6 vehicles of five different types will be completed and delivered to meet the needs of the Land Forces Command and the Gendarmerie General Command.
- Unmanned Land Vehicles (İnsansız Kara Araçları, İKA): To minimize military casualties and security risks, unmanned ground vehicles (UGVs) of various categories are procured. These vehicles are designed for use in reconnaissance and surveillance, logistics, engineering and reconnaissance, tactical deception, and combat in diverse and challenging environmental conditions such as soil, snow, rocky, and sandy terrain, as well as in caves, culverts, populated areas, and operational zones. They possess high mobility, are capable of integrating various operational payloads, and can be operated remotely or autonomously.

=== Air Systems ===
- New liaison and utility aircraft project.
- Hürkuş-2 light attack aircraft.
- TAI T929 ATAK 2(Attack helicopter) : Developed by Turkish Aerospace industries, Atak 2 will be better than the Atak T129 in terms of payload, overall performance, speed, range and avionics.
- TAI T925 (Utility helicopter) : 10 ton class utility helicopter is planned for Land Forces Command in the future.

=== Other systems ===
- UMTAS/LUMTAS-GM (Long-range Anti-tank guided missile): In the first configuration, UMTAS/LUMTAS-GM Block-1, there are two different seeker head options. The system, which can be used with an Infrared Imager Seeker (IIR) or Semi-Active Laser Seeker integrated, will be able to reach a range of 1 to 16 kilometers when launched from land vehicles and 1 to 20+ kilometers when launched from helicopters. Expected to enter in the inventory 2024. UMTAS/LUMTAS-GM-Blok-2, which has the ability to be fired day / night, according to the type of warhead it has; It can be used against main battle tanks, armoured personnel carriers, trucks, all-terrain vehicles, light pillboxes, trenches, buildings, helicopters flying at low altitude. It will be able to reach a range of 1 to 32+ kilometers when launched from land vehicles, and 1 to 50+ kilometers when launched from helicopters. Expected to enter in inventory 2025 onwards.
- LOMTAS (Medium-range Anti-tank guided missile): ROKETSAN has started to develop the LOMTAS Anti-Tank Missile over the OMTAS Missile with imager infrared seeker (IIR) head. Unlike OMTAS, the LOMTAS Anti-Tank Missile will have a semi-active laser seeker, and will be produced at an extremely low cost compared to OMTAS. The developed missile will be effective up to a range of 4+ kilometers.
- Gürz (Surface-to-air-missile): Developed by Aselsan Gürz is hybrid short-to-medium range air defence system. The design based on the ANADOLU ISUZU Seyit 8×8 vehicle includes the following systems : 35 mm cannon capable of using particulate ammunition, 4 BOZDOĞAN or GÖKDOĞAN derivative low-altitude air defence missiles, Very low-altitude defence missile, Fire Control Radar, AESA Search Radar with 4 indexes.
- GÖKBERK: Aselsan GÖKBERK is a Mobile Laser Weapon System which can track and detect UAVs with radar and electro-optical sensors. It stands out as a weapon system that performs the physical destruction of threats by using the Laser weapon with a power of at least 5 kW, and the functional destruction of threats by mixing using the Kangal jammer subsystem.

== Reserve equipment ==
Name	Origin	Type	Quantity	Details
Ceremonial equipment
CJ3B	United States; Turkey	Utility vehicle	N/A	Used in ceremonies and parades. Produced under license in Tuzla Military Factory as Tuzla 1013.
M1	United States; Turkey	Combat helmet	N/A	Used as ceremonial helmet. Local production. Also some M1 Airborne variants were in use.
M1 Garand	United States	Battle rifle	N/A	Used as ceremonial rifle. Received 312,430 M1 rifles from the U.S. between 1953–1970.
Personal equipment
BK-3 Helmet	Croatia	Combat helmet	N/A	Used by reserves and conscripts.
PASGT	United States; Turkey	Combat helmet	N/A	Used by reserves and conscripts. Local Savar SVRH01 and SVRH02 variants.
Interceptor	United States; Turkey	Ballistic vest	N/A	Used by reserves and conscripts. Local AFGM variants.
Kılınç 2000	Czech Republic; Turkey	Pistol	N/A	Former secondary service pistol. Kılınç 2000 is Turkish-made licensed variant of the CZ 75 by Sarsılmaz.
Yavuz 16	Italy; Turkey	Pistol	N/A	Former primary service pistol. Yavuz is Turkish-made licensed variant of the Beretta 92 by Girsan and MKEK.
FN FAL	Belgium; West Germany	Battle rifle	N/A	Bought form German surplus in 1960s as 'G1'. In storage.
HK G3	West Germany; Turkey	Battle rifle	N/A	Former primary service/battle rifle. G3A7 and G3A7A1 variants. Produced under license by Mechanical and Chemical Industry Corporation.
HK33	West Germany; Turkey	Assault rifle	N/A	Former secondary assault rifle. Fielded by conscripts and reserves. Produced under license by Mechanical and Chemical Industry Corporation.
M16	United States	Assault rifle	N/A	M16A3 and A4 variants were in limited use with some Commando and Infantry units. In storage.
Kalashnikov rifle	Soviet Union	Assault rifle	N/A	Various versions are kept in storage. MPi-KM variant was mostly bought from ex-East Germany stockpile after German reunification. Some Czechoslovak Sa vz. 58 were captured in Cyprus War. Other variants such as Soviet AK-47, AKM and Chinese Type 56 were captured from Kurdistan Workers' Party.
MG3	West Germany; Turkey	General-purpose machine gun	N/A	Former standard-issue GPMG. Produced under license by Mechanical and Chemical Industry Corporation.
Tank
M48 Patton	United States	Main battle tank	400	M48A5T1: Turkish M48 variant upgraded along similar lines to the M60A1, with an M68 105 mm main gun, passive night vision, M60A1 fire control system and an AVDS-1790 diesel engine. All in storage.
M60 Patton	United States	Main battle tank	100+	In storage. M60A1 variant.
Artillery
M107	United States	175mm self-propelled artillery	36	In storage.
M108	United States	155mm self-propelled artillery	25	In storage.
M116	United States	75mm towed artillery	180	Were mostly in service with mountain commando units.
Anti-aircraft
M42A1 Duster	United States	Self-propelled anti-aircraft weapon	110	In storage. Replaced by a new ASELSAN 35 mm self-propelled air defense gun (Korkut)
9K34 Strela-3	Soviet Union	MANPAD	N/A	Captured from Kurdistan Workers' Party during operation Operation Claw (2019–2020).
Vehicle
Otokar Akrep	Turkey	Armoured reconnaissance vehicle	260+	Replaced by Otokar Cobra I and Cobra II.
Anti-tank
M40	United States	Recoilless rifle	2137	M40A1. In reserve
9M113 Konkurs	Soviet Union	Wire-guided missile	74 launchers. 420+ missiles.	In reserve.
Aircraft
T-41 Mescalero	United States	Trainer aircraft	25	T-41D variant. All modernized.

== Retired equipment ==
=== Small arms ===
==== Rifles ====
- Martini–Henry
- Berthier M1916
- Lee–Enfield - 'Enfauser' hybrided with Mausers by MKEK.
- Gewehr 1888
- Gewehr 98 - later on all 98s and derivatives were converted to the M38 standard.
- Mauser Karabiner 98k
- Mauser Model 1871 - Turkish Mauser M1871/87 version.
- Mauser Model 1889 - Turkish Mauser M1890 version.
- Mauser Model 1893 - Ottoman variant
- Mauser Model 1903 - Ottoman Mauser
- Mauser Model M1905
- Mauser Model M1938 - Kırıkkale, the first rifle produced by MKEK.
- M1 carbine
- M1 Garand
- M14 rifle
- Mosin-Nagant M1891/30
- vz. 24
- vz. 98/22
- Winchester Model 1897
- Winchester Model 1912

==== Sidearms ====
- Beholla M1915
- Browning FN M1903
- Browning FN M1910 & M1922
- M1911 pistol - Local
- Browning Hi-Power - Local
- CZ vz. 27
- Frommer M1912 Stop
- Luger P08
- Mauser C96
- Smith & Wesson Model 3
- Smith & Wesson Model 10
- vz. 50
- Walther PP - Kırıkkale, the first pistol produced by MKEK.

==== Submachine guns ====
- Bergmann MP18/I
- M3 SMG
- Sten
- Thompson submachine gun

==== Light machine guns ====
- Bergmann MG15nA
- Chauchat
- M1918 BAR
- M1919 Browning
- Madsen MG
- MG 34
- ZB vz. 26
- ZB vz. 30 - Produced under license.

==== Heavy machine guns ====
- Ckm wz. 30
- Hotchkiss Mle 1914 machine gun
- MG 08/15
- Maxim
- PM M1910
- Schwazlose M1907/12
- Vickers machine gun

==== Launchers ====
- Bazooka
- M1 mortar
- M2 mortar
- M7 grenade launcher
- M18 recoilless rifle
- M20 recoilless rifle
- M67 recoilless rifle
- M79 grenade launcher

==== Personal Protection ====
- Adrian helmet
- Brodie helmet
- M1 helmet
- Mk 2 grenade
- Stahlhelm
- Stielhandgranate

=== Vehicles ===
==== Tanks ====
- M4 Sherman - 34 delivered in January 1945.
- M3 Stuart - 210 received from 1942 to 1944.
- M18 Hellcat - Mainly in Korean War.
- M24 Chaffee – 238 were bought through NATO.
- M36 tank destroyer - 222
- M47 Patton - Bought in 1950s. 767 were in reserve in 1994.
- Mk VI light tank - 50
- Panzer III - In 1943, received 22 Panzer III Ausf. Ms.
- Panzer IV - 35 Panzer IVs received until 4 May 1944 in exchange for some chromium ore. Delivery began with the Ausf. G and probably went on with Ausf. H versions.
- Renault FT - One company of Renault FT received in 1921 or 1928.
- Renault R35 - 100; two batches of fifty each in February and March 1940.
- Vickers 6-ton – used 16 Type A tanks since 1940.
- T-26 - 60 were bought in 1935.
- T-27 - 5 were bought in 1935.
- T-28 (medium tank) - two were bought in 1935 to form the 1st Tank Regiment of the 2nd Cavalry Division at Luleburgaz.
- T-37A tank - One unit was gifted.
- Valentine tank - received 200 Valentines in different versions between 1941 and 1944.

==== Armoured vehicles ====
- BA-3 & 6 - 60 were bought in 1935.
- BTR-60 - 250 were bought from ex-USSR surplus. Later, they were modernized with thermal sight and engine improvements.
- BTR-80 - 250 were bought from ex-USSR surplus. Later, they were modernized with thermal sight and engine improvements.
- Condor (APC) - 25
- Daimler Dingo - captured units in Cyprus War
- M3 half-track
- M8 Greyhound
- M59 armored personnel carrier - 1500
- M32 tank recovery vehicle
- M74 armored recovery vehicle - 70
- Universal Carrier
- Otokar Akrep

==== Artillery & Anti-Aircraft ====
- 7.5 cm Model 1903
- 7.7 cm FK 96 n.A.
- 10 cm M. 14 Feldhaubitze
- 10.5 cm Feldhaubitze 98/09
- 15 cm sFH 13
- 21 cm Kanone 39
- 24 cm Haubitze 39
- 90 mm gun M1
- 155 mm gun M1
- Bishop (artillery)
- Deacon (artillery)
- M7 Priest
- M15 half-track
- M16 Multiple Gun Motor Carriage
- M270 MLRS
- M42 Duster
- M51 Skysweeper
- M55 self-propelled howitzer
- M102 howitzer
- M108 howitzer
- M1905 howitzer
- RA-7040
- Skoda K series
- Škoda 75 mm Model 15
- Škoda 100 mm Model 16/19
- Škoda 100 mm Model 1916

==== Utility ====
- 6-ton 6×6 truck
- M151 ¼-ton 4×4 utility truck
- M35 series 2½-ton 6×6 cargo truck
- M939 series 5-ton 6×6 truck
- M39 series 5-ton 6×6 truck
- M809 series 5-ton 6×6 truck
- Willys CJ - produced under license.
- Willys MB
- Willys MD

=== Aircraft ===
Helicopter
Name	Origin	Type	Quantity	Details
Robinson R22	United States	Trainer helicopter	N/A	
TH-55 Osage	United States	Trainer helicopter	28	
Bell AH-1 Cobra	United States	Attack helicopter	40	All AH-1P and AH1S Cobra helicopters were retired. At least 4 from 28 helicopters are lost in accidents and one shot down. Four TAH1P were used in trainings. 10 AH-1W variants were transferred to the Navy. All modernized.
Bell OH-58 Kiowa	United States	Observation helicopter	3	
Sikorsky H-19 Chickasaw	United States	Utility helicopter	N/A	Most underwent electronic and mechanical upgrades.
Kaman K-225	United States	Experimental aircraft	1	First helicopter to fly on Turkish soil.
Airplane
Citabria	United States	Utility aircraft	34	7GCBC variant. All modernized.
Cessna 185 Skywagon	United States	Utility aircraft	N/A	U17B variant.
Dornier Do 27	Germany	Utility aircraft	N/A	Do 27A-1 & -2 variant.
Dornier Do 28	Germany	Utility aircraft	N/A	Do 28D-1 & -2 variant.
Unmanned
Canadair CL-89	Canada	UAV	x	
IAI Heron	Israel	UAV	10	With ASELSAN-made FLIR systems.
IAI Harpy	Israel	Loitering munition	100	Spesifically tailored version for TLF.
Ryan Firebee	United States	Target drone	x	

== Gallery ==
UAV

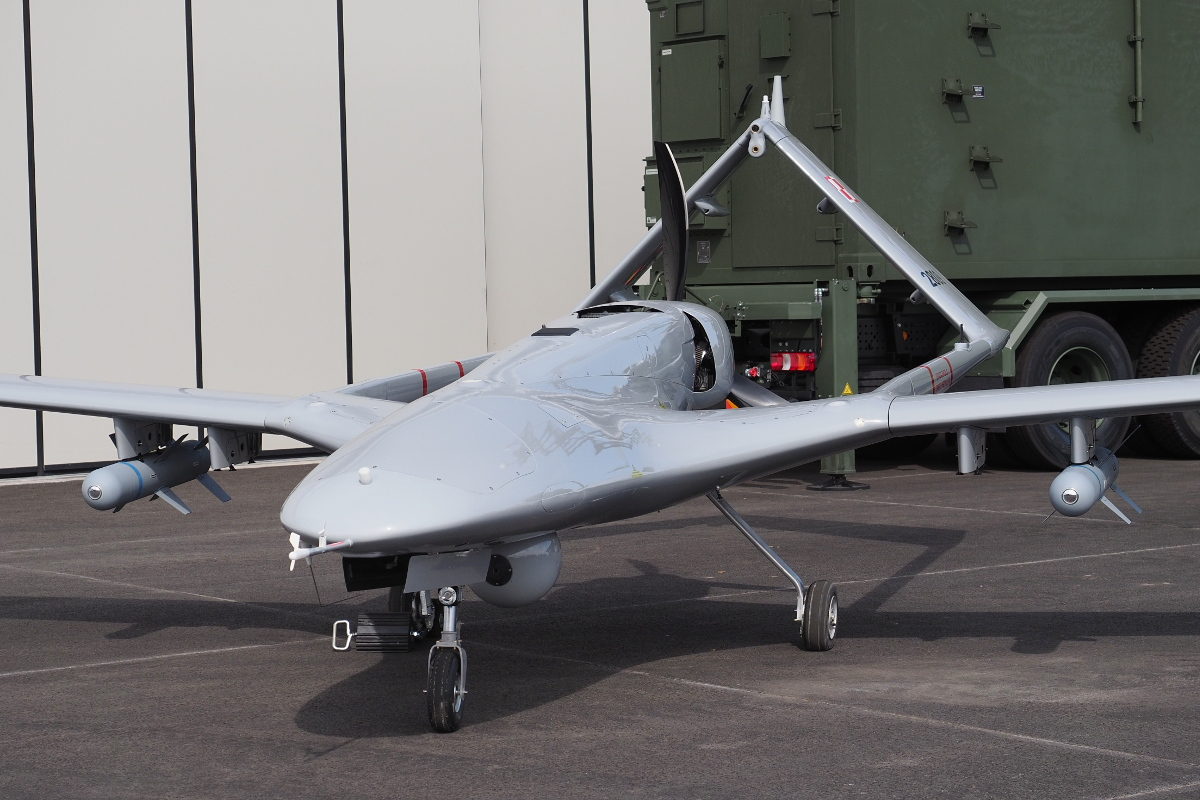
Bayraktar TB2

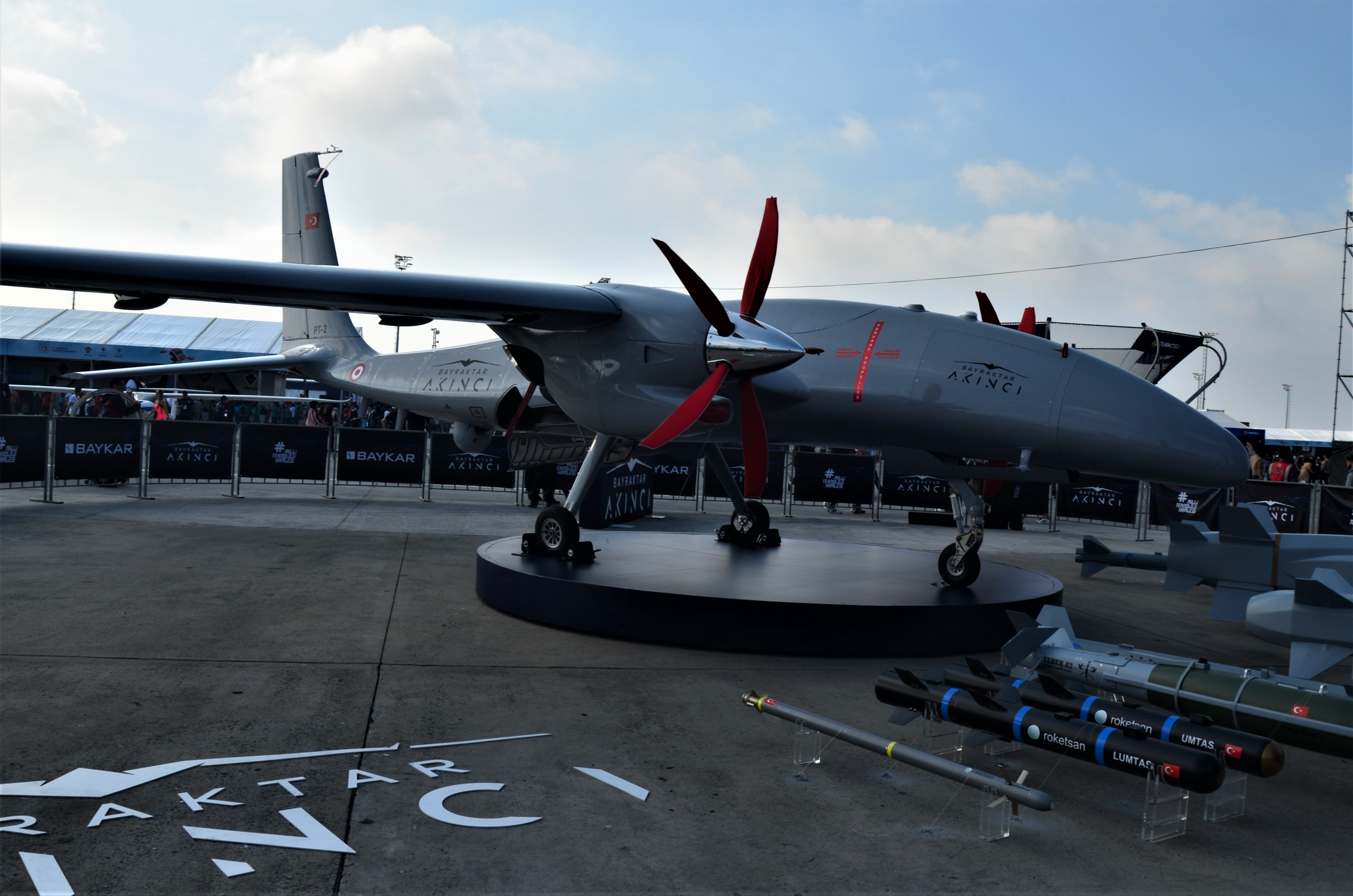
Bayraktar Akıncı
