= ST9 =

ST9 may refer to:

- ST9, an ST postcode area of the United Kingdom
- the Sarsılmaz Arms ST9, a semi-automatic handgun
- ST9 Enterprise Risk Management exam, of the Institute and Faculty of Actuaries

== See also ==
- Star Trek: Insurrection, the ninth Star Trek film
