= Taurus SMT =

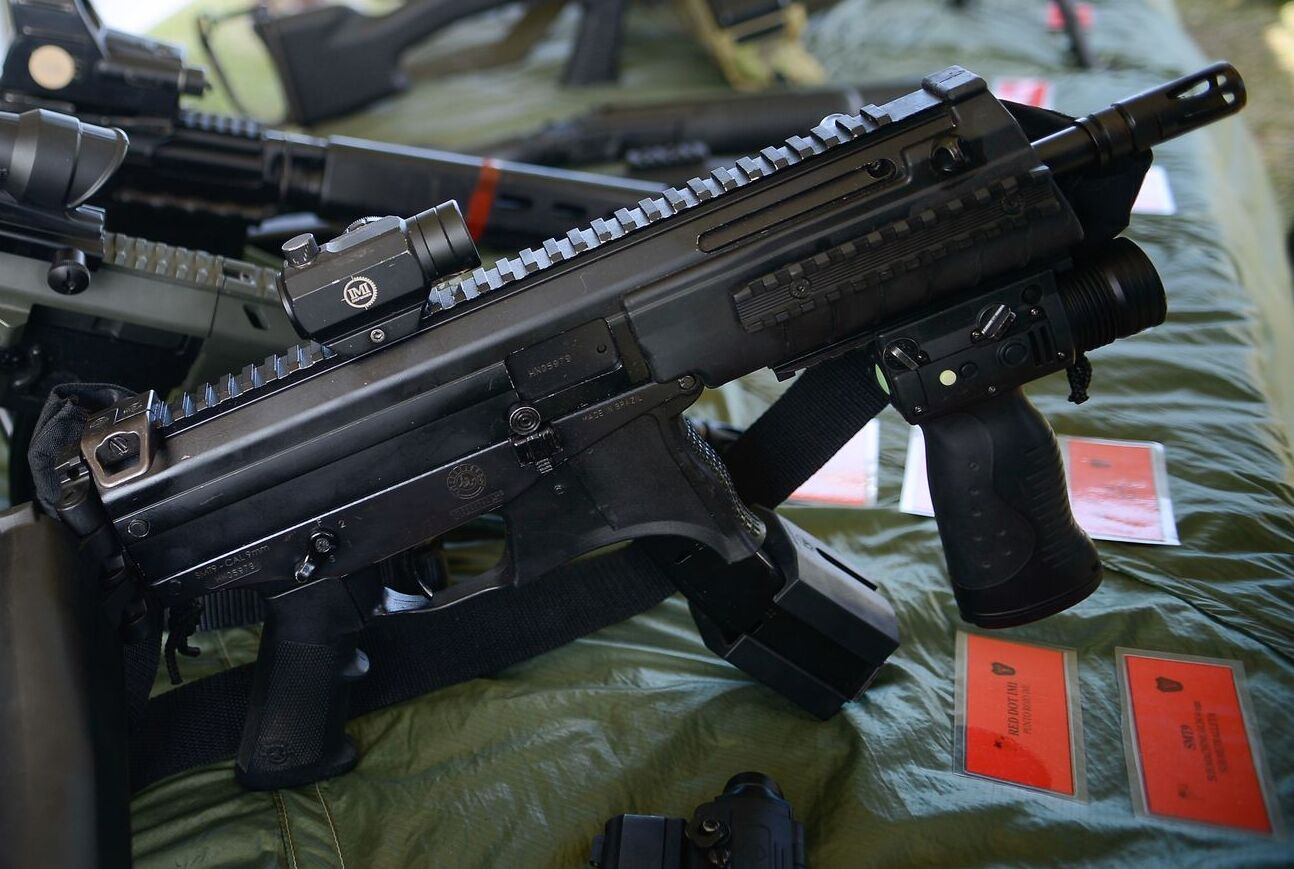
- Taurus SMT9 with a vertical foregrip
- Type: Submachine gun
- Place of origin: Brazil

Service history
- Wars: Brazilian drug war

Production history
- Designed: 2011
- Manufacturer: Taurus Armas
- Variants: See Variants

Specifications
- Mass: SMT9 and SMT40: 3,350 kg (unloaded); 3,550 kg (loaded); CT G2: 3, 800 kg (unloaded); 4,200 kg (loaded)
- Length: SMT9 and SMT40: 475 mm (stock folded); 681–760 mm (stock extended CT G2: 800 mm
- Barrel length: 200 mm (SMT9); 406 mm (CT G2)
- Caliber: 9×19mm Parabellum (SMT9).40 S&W (SMT40).45 ACP (CT45 G2)
- Action: Blowback, closed bolt
- Rate of fire: 750 (±50) rounds/min
- Feed system: 10-, 15-, or 30-round box magazines
- Sights: Iron sights adjustable for elevation and laterality, or Picatinny rail for various optics

The Taurus SMT is a submachine gun manufactured by Taurus Firearms, chambered in either 9×19mm Parabellum (SMT9) or .40 S&W (SMT40).

== History ==
The Taurus SMT was reported to be in development in 2010 when Taurus announced that it was developing a new submachine gun.

The Taurus SMT was later introduced in early 2011, under the designation MT G2.

== Variants ==
=== SMT9 ===
The Taurus SMT9 is the configuration chambered in 9×19mm Parabellum cartridge.

=== SMT9C ===
The Taurus SMT9C is a compact variant with a 165 mm (6.5 in) barrel length.

=== SMT40 ===
The Taurus SMT40 is the configuration chambered in .40 S&W cartridge.

=== CT9 G2 ===
The Taurus CT9 G2 is a semi-automatic only pistol-caliber carbine variant of the SMT9 (MT9 G2) intended for the civilian and security markets. It was first announced at the 2011 SHOT Show.

=== CTT40 ===
The Taurus CTT40 is a semi-automatic only variant of the SMT40.

== Derivatives ==
=== T9 ===
The Taurus T9 is chambered in 9×19mm Parabellum and features a 5.5-inch barrel. It was adopted by the Indian Army. 550 units were ordered and will be manufactured in India by Jindal Defence through transfer of technology.

=== RPC9 ===
The Taurus RPC9 was unveiled at IWA 2025, it features a roller locked bolt system and chambered in 9×19mm Parabellum.

== Users ==
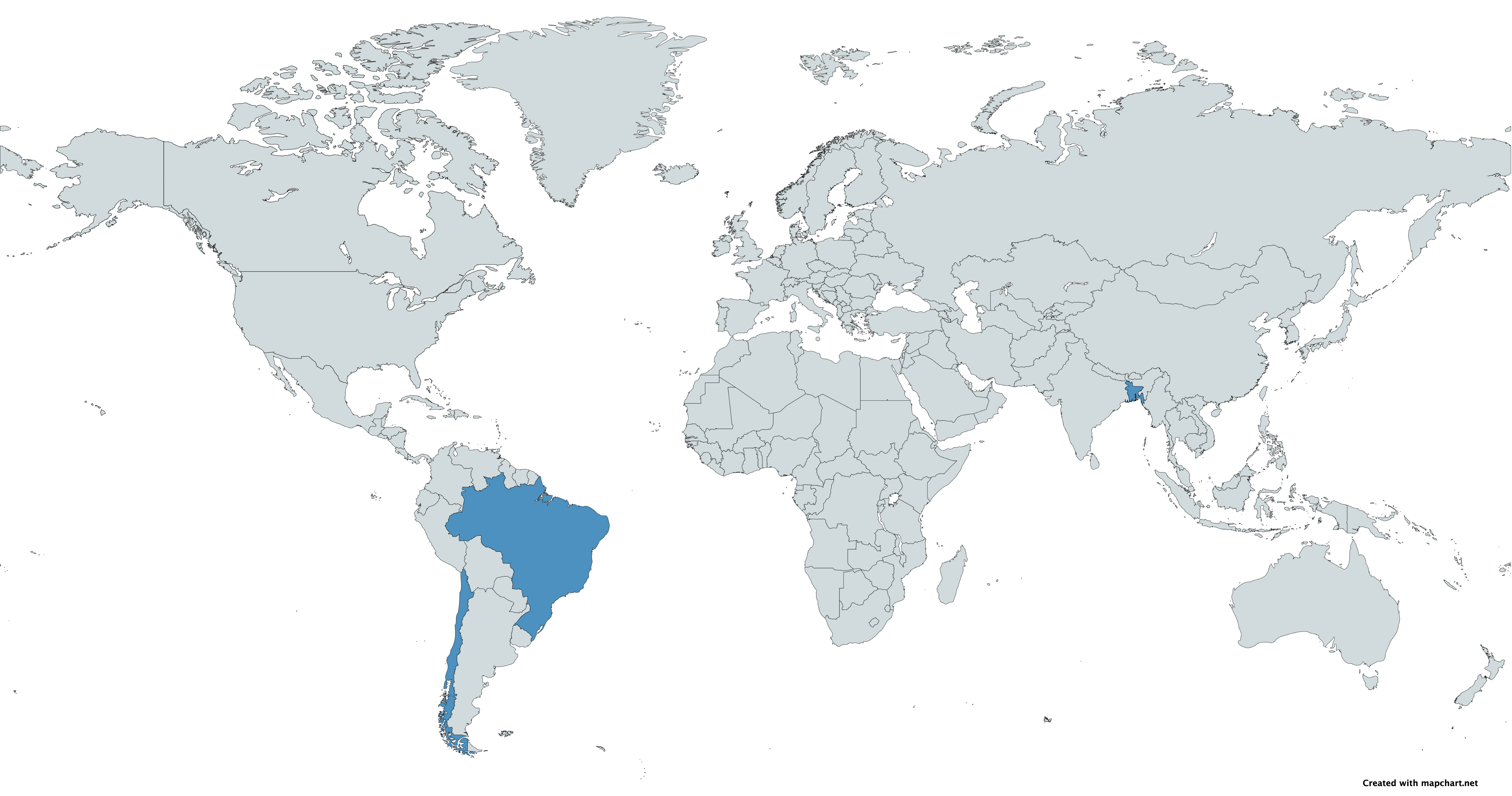
A map with Taurus SMT users in blue

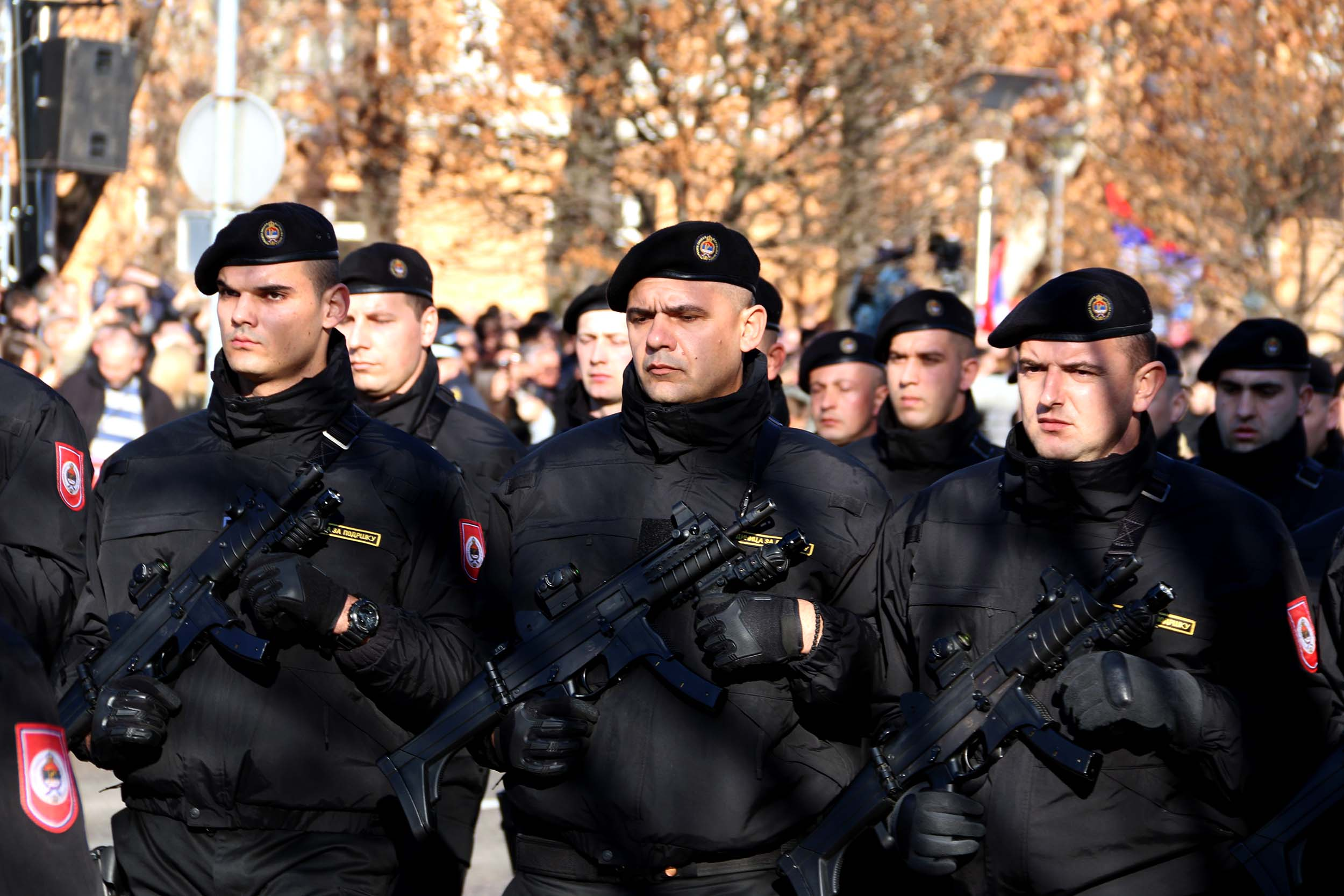
Taurus SMT9 used by the Police of Repblika Srpska

- Bangladesh
  - Bangladesh Air Force: SMT9C used by the Ground Specialized Unit (41 Squadron).
  - Bangladesh Police: SMT9C used by the Special Security and Protection Battalion (SPBN).
- Brazil
  - Brazilian Army: SMT9 used by the Brazilian Army.
  - Law enforcement in Brazil: SMT40 used by the Brazilian Law enforcement.
- China
- El Salvador
- Lebanon
- Republika Srpska: Used by the Police of Republika Srpska.
- Sri Lanka: Used by the Sri Lanka Army Commando Regiment.

== See also ==
- Beretta Mx4 Storm
- CZ Scorpion Evo 3
- HS Produkt Kuna
- PP-2000
- SAR 109T
