= Havelsan Barkan =

Turkish prototype ground-based drone

The Havelsan Barkan is a prototype of a Turkish unmanned ground combat vehicle developed by HAVELSAN for the needs of the Turkish Land Forces and the law enforcement forces.

Barkan features a remote controlled weapon station, electro-optical sensors and many data links. It was introduced to the public end February 2021.

== BARKAN II ==
The BARKAN II is an advanced iteration of the BARKAN unmanned ground vehicle (UGV) developed by HAVELSAN. It builds upon the operational experience of the first-generation BARKAN system and introduces improvements in autonomy, payload capacity, sensor integration, and network-centric warfare capabilities.

Compared to its predecessor, BARKAN II is designed for enhanced battlefield endurance and improved autonomous navigation in complex terrain. It is also optimized for integration with modern command-and-control (C2) systems and multi-domain operations.

Key reported improvements include upgraded artificial intelligence-assisted decision support, enhanced obstacle detection systems, and improved payload modularity enabling reconnaissance, surveillance, and light combat roles.

The platform is intended to operate in coordinated swarm or multi-unit formations, supporting infantry units in reconnaissance, logistics support, and force protection missions.

=== Specifications (reported) ===
- Enhanced autonomous navigation system
- AI-assisted mission planning and targeting support
- Improved sensor fusion suite (EO/IR and situational awareness systems)
- Modular payload architecture
- Secure encrypted communications for network-centric operations

== BARKAN III ==
The BARKAN III represents the most advanced configuration in the BARKAN UGV family as of its latest development phase. It is designed as a higher-end autonomous combat and support platform with expanded artificial intelligence capabilities and deeper integration into multi-domain operational environments.

BARKAN III is expected to feature significantly improved autonomy, higher levels of mission independence, and greater interoperability with manned-unmanned teaming (MUM-T) concepts. The system is aimed at performing complex battlefield roles including reconnaissance, target acquisition, logistics support, and potential direct fire support depending on configuration.

The platform is also designed to operate in highly contested electronic warfare environments, with strengthened resistance to jamming and cyber interference.

=== Expected capabilities ===
- Advanced AI-driven autonomous mission execution
- Multi-vehicle coordination and swarm operations
- Enhanced electronic warfare resistance
- Improved survivability and stealth profile
- Integration with airborne and ground C2 networks

== Development ==
The BARKAN family of unmanned ground vehicles is developed by HAVELSAN as part of Türkiye's broader effort to expand autonomous and robotic systems in land warfare. The system is designed to support modern network-centric doctrines and reduce soldier exposure in high-risk environments.

The evolution from BARKAN to BARKAN II and BARKAN III reflects increasing emphasis on artificial intelligence, autonomy, and interoperability within joint operations frameworks.

== See also ==
- HAVELSAN
- Unmanned ground vehicle
- Autonomous military robotics
- Manned-unmanned teaming
