= SAR 109T =

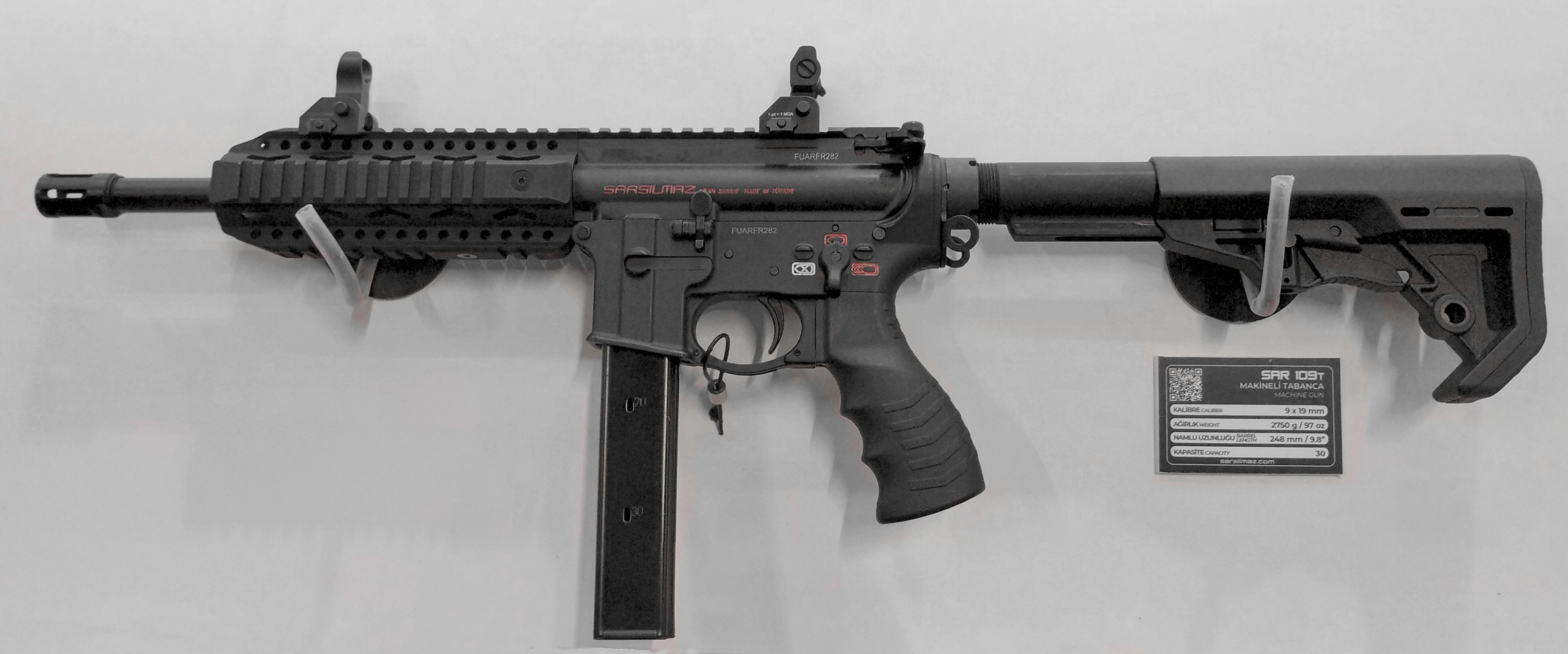
- Type: Submachine gun
- Place of origin: Turkey

Production history
- Designer: Sarsılmaz
- Manufacturer: Sarsılmaz
- Produced: 2014

Specifications
- Mass: 2.4 kilograms (5.3 lb) without magazine
- Length: 620 mm (folded) -705 mm (extended)
- Barrel length: 220 mm
- Width: 55 mm
- Height: 277 mm (30 rounds)
- Caliber: 9×19 mm
- Action: Blowback
- Rate of fire: 900-1000 rounds/min
- Muzzle velocity: 396m/s
- Feed system: 10, 20, or 30 round box magazine

The SAR 109T is a 9×19mm submachine gun manufactured in 2014 by Sarsılmaz.

== Design ==
The SAR 109T is a lightweight and modular submachine gun that resembles the American ArmaLite AR-15 (M16). According to the manufacturer, it discharges casings from the right in single shooting mode. The barrel has polygonal rifling and a 1:10 twist rate. A force of 25 N is required to pull the trigger. The gun has a 6-groove, right hand turn barrel profile.

The chassis of the 109T is a two-part aluminium alloy receiver with a hammer-fired mil-spec trigger. Firing controls include an M16-type non-reciprocating charging handle and an M16-style fire mode selector/safety switch.

The SAR 109T also features a Picatinny rail, which allows for quick mounting of NATO accessories without additional tools.

== Users ==
- Syria: Used by Internal Security Command.
- Turkey: Police Special Operations Department received 4500 SAR 109Ts in 2019.
- United States: Miami-Dade County police department

== See also ==
- Colt 9mm SMG
- Taurus SMT
- CS/LS7
- PP-2000
- HS Produkt Kuna
