= Havelsan BAHA =

Turkish unmanned combat aerial vehicle

General information
- Type: Unmanned combat aerial vehicle
- National origin: Turkey
- Manufacturer: HAVELSAN
- Status: In service
- Primary user: Turkey

History
- Introduction date: 2024
- First flight: 2021; 4 years ago

BAHA, acronym for Turkish: Bulut Altı İnsansız Hava Aracı), is a Turkish sub-cloud autonomous vertical take-off and landing unmanned aerial vehicle developed by HAVELSAN for the needs of the border security forces.

== Background ==
The development of BAHA lasted one year at the Turkish defence industry company HAVELSAN. It was introduced at the "International Anatolian Eagle 2021 Exercie" held at the 3rd Main Jet Base Command in Konya in June–July. By early October 2021, it was reported that the UAV successfully completed the flight test in an altitude of 7,500 ft (2,300 m) at a distance of 10 km (6.2 mi) far from the Ground Support Center. It can perform activities like surveillance footage (IMINT), reconnaissance, transferring and resisting radio jamming. It has a maximum takeoff weight (MTOW) of 30 kg (66 lb) and its payload capacity is 6 kg (13 lb). The electrical powered version has an endurance of 2 hours, and the fuel powered version has 2.5 hours.

The BAHA is operated from a land vehicle. A further development for the central control of a swarm of 20–30 UAVs, each operated from one land vehicle, is in progress. It is expected that the development was accomplished mid 2021. In 2022, the UAV was redesigned in line with the needs of the Turkish Armed Forces.

== Characteristics ==
BAHA has a wingspan of 3.70 m (12.1 ft). The UAV is able to be airborne up to six hours with its gasoline engine and up to two hours with its electric engine. It can operate at altitudes of up to 15,000 ft (4,600 m) in a service range of 80 km (50 mi). Its payload capacity is 5 kg (11 lb).

The system can be easily set up by two people, operated by a single person, and can be ready for duty within minutes.

== Service ==
BAHA meets the need for images with its ability to fly under clouds when it becomes difficult to take images with other type of UAVs due to adverse weather conditions. It contributes so to obtaining the first information about settlements, where transportation is not possible due to natural disasters.

It can be used in tasks such as tracking, detection and area protection, intelligence, electronic warfare, coastal and border security, energy transmission and oil-gas lines inspection, anti-smuggling and anti-terrorism, public order, narcotic plant detection, residential thermal measurement, forest fire management, post-disaster assessment., environmental pollution detection, agricultural practices and cartography.

Following exportation of BAHA to the Nigerian military in Africa, and to Central Asia, it was delivered to the Turkish Armed Forces end December 2023.

== See also ==
- Havelsan Bulut
