= Havelsan =

Turkish Software Company

- Type: Government-owned corporation
- Industry: Defence, Software
- Founded: 1982
- Headquarters: Ankara, Turkey
- Products: Peace Eagle, Cn235 Flight Simulator, D-Class Seahawk Simulator, EHTES, Meltem
- Revenue: 208.2 million TL (2008)
- Number of employees: 1222 (for the year 2008)
- Website: havelsan.com/en

Havelsan is a Turkish software and systems company having business presence in the defence and IT sectors. It is headquartered in Ankara, Turkey, with subsidiary companies and offices around Turkey and abroad. Havelsan is mostly active in the fields of C4ISR, naval combat systems, e-government applications, reconnaissance surveillance and intelligence systems, management information systems, simulation and training systems, logistics support, homeland security systems and energy management systems.

== History ==
Havelsan was established by the Turkish Air Force (TUAF) Foundation in 1982 as a Turkish company named Havelsan-Aydin to provide maintenance for the Turkish Air Force's high technology radars.

In 1985, Havelsan was separated from the foreign shareholders and incorporated as a national company with a share of 98% owned by the Turkish Armed Forces Foundation.

In 1997, Havelsan added command control system (C4ISR), training and simulations system and management information systems to its functions. As the "Informatics and System House of Turkey" Havelsan has been designing and planning critical defense systems such as management information system, homeland security system, simulation and training system and C4ISR.

Although Havelsan has generally been involved in military software projects, it has also taken responsibilities on e-government projects and successfully implemented them.

Havelsan is one of the subcontractors of the Peace Eagle Project. Havelsan is mainly responsible for delivering the ground support segment which consists of crew training, mission planning and software maintenance functions. Havelsan worked on becoming a main subcontractor of Boeing for Italian and Korean AEW&C projects, but Boeing withdrew from this sub-contractorship in early 2009. Havelsan decided to increase its production capacity by investing 143 million dollars in Ankara and Istanbul in 2025.

== Sectoral position and rewards ==
Kal-Der, the Turkish Quality Association, published the Turkish Quality Map of 2008-2009. Introduced at the National Quality Congress held on November 12–14, 2007, Havelsan is presented as the first defence industry company on the Map.

High Election Council, Computer Supported Central Elections Registry System -SEÇSİS- which was developed by Havelsan, came first in its category services from State to Public in the 5th e-Turkey rewards and Congress Ceremony on 22 December 2007.

Havelsan keeps its leadership in the 'sectoral software' field, according to Turkey's First IT Companies results. Havelsan is listed in 4th rank for income among the ten IT companies in Ankara.

Havelsan is listed at number 225 of "First 500 Company" research done by İstanbul Commercial Chamber (ISO). In 2007, Havelsan was listed, as in 2006, included in the research of Fast Developing Companies in Turkey (Fast 50) by Deloitte for the latest five years and, in the same research, of Fast Developing Companies in Europe, Africa and Middle East (EMEA) regions in 2006.

Awarded with the prize for ”Commercial Success in New Products” in the competition ”TESİD 2006 Electronic and Information Technologies Innovation - Creativity Prizes”. In 2006, Land Registry and Cadaster Information System (TAKBİS) was selected as the ”most successful e-government project in Turkey” in the ”e-Tr Congress and Prize Ceremony, organized by Tusiad and Tubisad.

Awarded with “FAI Honorary Diploma” by Federation Aeronautique Internationale (FAI) “In the work of Turkey's the biggest 500 exporter firm”; Havelsan exports for about 30 million dollars and became in the 337 row in 2006.

In 2004 and 2005, National Justice Information System (UYAP) was selected as the most successful e-government project in Turkey in the “e-Tr Congress and Prize Ceremony”, organized by TÜSİAD and TBV.

== Products ==
=== 2026 additions ===
Havelsan has expanded its unmanned systems portfolio across air, land, and maritime domains as part of its Unmanned and Autonomous Systems ecosystem. These platforms are designed for integrated operations, network-centric warfare, and multi-domain interoperability.

==== Air systems ====
- BAHA, a sub-cloud autonomous unmanned aerial vehicle (UAV) designed for reconnaissance and surveillance missions in GPS-denied or contested environments.
- BULUT, an unmanned aerial vehicle (UAV) developed for reconnaissance, surveillance, and intelligence missions.
- Bozbey is a fixed-wing, Vertical Take-Off and Landing (VTOL) autonomous UAV.
- Poyraz, is a lightweight autonomous quadcopter UAV (rotary-wing drone).

==== Land systems ====
- Barkan, an unmanned ground vehicle (UGV) designed for reconnaissance, surveillance, and support operations.
- Barkan II, an upgraded UGV with improved autonomy, sensor fusion, and enhanced mission coordination capabilities.
- Barkan III, a next-generation autonomous combat support platform featuring advanced AI-driven mission execution and manned-unmanned teaming (MUM-T) integration.
- Kapgan, a heavy-class unmanned ground vehicle designed for high payload logistics and battlefield support missions.

==== Maritime systems ====
- Çaka, an unmanned surface vehicle (USV) designed for maritime reconnaissance, surveillance, and littoral operations.
- Sancar, an autonomous unmanned surface vessel developed for naval reconnaissance, surveillance, and operational support in coastal and open-sea environments.

==== AI systems ====
- MAIN, an offline artificial intelligence-based secure virtual assistant platform designed for closed-loop corporate and defense environments.

=== ADVENT-AI ===
In May 2026, HAVELSAN introduced ADVENT-AI, an artificial intelligence-supported decision support layer developed for the ADVENT Combat Management System family during SAHA EXPO 2026 in Istanbul.

The system is designed to analyze large volumes of operational data in real time, supporting naval operators through anomaly detection, tactical picture generation, object classification under electronic warfare conditions, intelligent monitoring, navigation assistance, and AI-supported naval gunfire effectiveness prediction.

According to HAVELSAN, ADVENT-AI was developed as a modular capability integrated into the distributed architecture of the ADVENT CMS and can be deployed to existing platforms through software updates.

== See also ==
- Turkish Aerospace Industries
- Aselsan
- Roketsan
