= Havelsan Bulut =

Turkish unmanned aerial vehicle

General information
- Type: Unmanned aerial vehicle
- National origin: Turkey
- Manufacturer: Havelsan
- Status: In service
- Primary user: Turkey

Bulut is a Turkish autonomous unmanned aerial vehicle developed by Havelsan for the needs of the military and security forces.

== Characteristics ==
Robotic Autonomous Systems Center of Havelsan developed Bulut UAV with the experience got through its UAV Havelsan BAHA in line with the needs set by the Defence Industry Agency.

Bulut UAV uses an electric motor system for vertical take-off and landing without the need for a runway. It is able to be airborne up to six hours with its internal combustion engine powered by gasoline. It has fully autonomous flight capability. It has a payload capacity of 5 kg (11 lb). It can perform satellite navigation-independent reconnaissance and surveillance missions, and can share data up to 80 km (50 mi). Able to operate in low rain and snow conditions, it can adapt to different operational conditions with its advanced sensors and software. Equipped with an EO/IR/LRF integrated camera system, the UAV can be transferred from one ground control station to another during the mission. This feature provides operational flexibility for security forces.

== Service ==
The UAV offers advanced operational features such as moving object detection and collision avoidance. Additionally, thanks to its anti-jamming technology, it can also function in electronic warfare environments. It is actively used in operational areas. The UAV's operation areas include many tasks such as border and coastal patrol, fight against smuggling and terrorism, narcotics detection, intervention in forest fires, oil and natural gas pipeline security, search and rescue, power lines control and environmental pollution detection.

Bulut UAV successfully passed the tests following the completion of development activities, and entered the inventory of the Turkish Armed Forces and the General Directorate of Security.

== See also ==
- Havelsan BAHA
