= MKE 120 MM 44C =

- Type: Smoothbore tank gun
- Place of origin: Turkey

Production history
- Designer: Mechanical and Chemical Industry Corporation (MKE)
- Manufacturer: Mechanical and Chemical Industry Corporation (MKE)

Specifications
- Mass: Gun barrel: 1,180 kg (2,600 lb); Total: 3,700 kg (8,200 lb)
- Length: 5.812 m (19.07 ft)
- Barrel length: 5,410 mm
- Rate of fire: 6 rds/min
- Effective firing range: APFSDS-T: 3,000 meters (3,300 yd); TANOK: 6,000 meters (6,600 yd)

The MKE 120 MM 44C is a 120 mm smoothbore tank gun manufactured by the Turkish state-controlled defense company Mechanical and Chemical Industry Corporation (MKE). It is primarily designed as a main armament upgrade for the M60 series of main battle tanks.

== Design and development ==
The weapon system was developed to enhance the firepower of legacy M60 tanks, allowing them to engage modern armored threats effectively. The barrel is smoothbore and chrome-plated to reduce wear and extend service life. The design allows it to fit within the turret constraints of the M60 tank, which was originally designed for a smaller 105 mm gun. The system is designed to operate in extreme environmental conditions, ranging from −45 °C to +70 °C.

== Ammunition ==
The gun can fire various types of tank ammunitions including MKE made APFSDS-T, TPCSDS-T and training. The gun is also able to fire Roketsan made TANOK gun-launched 120 mm laser guided anti-tank missile with a range of 1–6 km.
