= Sarsılmaz Kılınç 2000 =

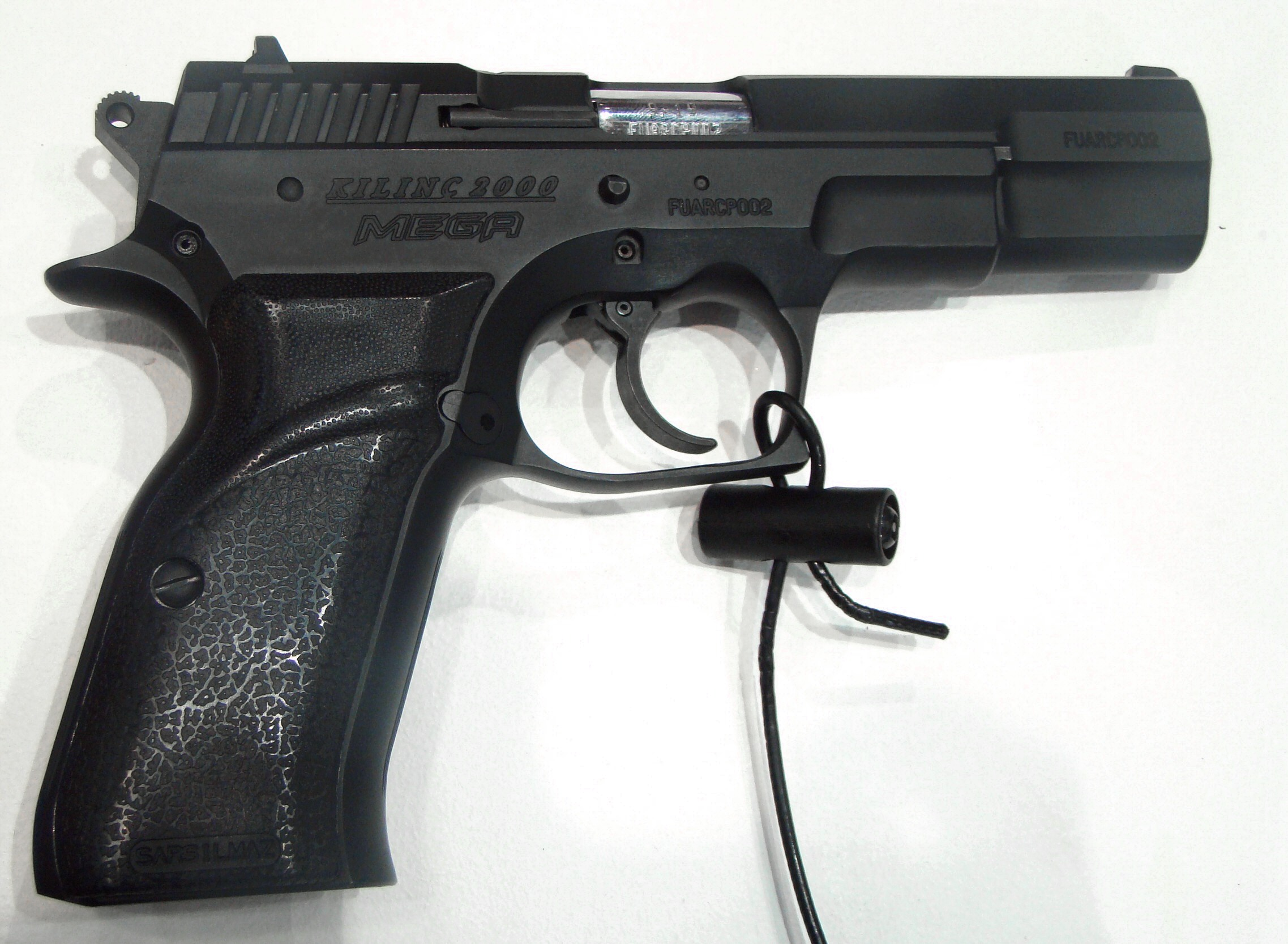
- Sarsılmaz Kılınç 2000
- Type: Semi-automatic pistol
- Place of origin: Turkey

Service history
- Used by: Turkish Armed Forces; General Directorate of Security

Production history
- Manufacturer: Sarsılmaz Arms, imported to USA by ArmaLite
- Unit cost: $550 (Standard models) - $630 (Tactical Custom models)
- Produced: 2007 - present

Specifications
- Mass: 34.9 oz or 990 g (AR-24/15); 33.4 oz or 950 g (AR-24K/13)
- Length: 8.27 in or 21.0 cm (AR-24/15); 7.46 in or 18.9 cm (AR-24K/13).
- Barrel length: 4.671 in or 11.86 cm (AR-24/15); 3.89 in or 9.9 cm (AR-24K/13)
- Width: 1.34 in or 3.4 cm
- Height: 5.26 in or 13.4 cm (AR-24/15); 5.11 in or 13.0 cm (AR-24K/13)
- Cartridge: 9×19mm Parabellum
- Caliber: 9 mm
- Action: Short recoil, locked breech
- Feed system: 13-round (AR-24K/13); 15-round (AR-24/15) box magazine. 10-round magazines are standard issue with American civilian market models.
- Sights: Fixed (AR-24/15 Standard and AR-24K/13 Compact); Adjustable (AR-24/15C and AR-24/13C Target Custom).

The Sarsılmaz Kılınç 2000 is a semi-automatic pistol chambered for the 9×19mm Parabellum round. It is manufactured at the Sarsılmaz Silah Sanayi factory in Turkey. It was previously sold in the U.S. by the ArmaLite corporation under the ArmaLite name as the AR-24.

It is now self-imported by SAR USA as the SAR2000 with an updated thick rubber tactical grip and black phosphate finish.

== Design ==
The weapon is similar to the Tanfoglio variant of the Czech CZ-75, with design elements borrowed from the SIG P210, though few of its parts are interchangeable with the Tanfoglio weapon from whose machining dies and blue prints it was derived. It has a hot forged steel frame mated to a heavy milled slide treated with manganese phosphate, and coated in heat-cured epoxy.

== Variants ==
=== AR-24/15 ===
The AR-24/15 Standard model has a parkerized finish and fixed dovetailed rear sights and a proprietary front sight with three white paint dots.

=== AR-24/15C ===
The AR-24/15C Tactical Custom Model has checkering machined on the front and back grip straps and its rear notch sight is adjustable for windage.

=== AR-24K/13 ===
The AR-24K/13 Compact and AR-24K/13C Compact Tactical Custom are like the full-sized variants, differing only in their shorter barrels, grips, and amount of ammunition carried.
