= BMC Altuğ =

- Type: AFV
- Place of origin: Turkey

Production history
- Designed: 2020
- Manufacturer: BMC Otomotiv
- No. built: 29 (Will delivered in 2027)
- Variants: APC variant with 12.7 mm machine gun or 40 mm grenade launcher as main gun

Specifications
- Crew: 3 (Commander, Driver, Gunner)
- Passengers: 9
- Main armament: AFV: 35 mm autocannon APC: 12.7 mm machinegun - 40 mm grenade launcher
- Maximum speed: 110 km/h

BMC Altuğ is a Turkish armoured fighting vehicle and armoured personnel carrier designed by BMC. Developed in 2020, Altuğ made its first appearance in 2021 during IDEF 2021. Still being on the development, first arrival of Altuğ on field is planned for 2027, 29 Altup 8x8 will be delivered to KKK.

== Technical Specifications ==
BMC Altuğ 8x8 has a Caterpillar C13 engine with 711 hp and Allison 4000 Series transmission >20 hp/ton with 6 front 1 back gear. Also has a generator with 24 V 600 A alterator. With a total speed of 110 km/h, and the ability of crossing 120 cm deep water, it also has the movement capability of > 700km.

Having 3 personnel (Commander, driver, gunner) and 9 passenger capacity, it comes with 35 mm double-feed auto cannon as main armament and 12.7 mm machine gun as secondary.

The vehicle features scalable modular ballistic, mine, and IED protection, a CBRN protection system (overpressure + masked), a fire extinguishing and explosion suppression system, a battlefield friend-or-foe identification (IFF) system, a laser warning system, an active protection system (APS), a gunshot detection system, a 360-degree situational awareness system, and a mobile camouflage net.

== Variants ==
- Altuğ 8x8 ZMA: Is the AFV version with 35 mm autocannon as main armanent.
- Altuğ 8X8 ZPT: Is the APC version with 12.7 mm machine gun as main armanent.
