= HS Produkt Kuna =

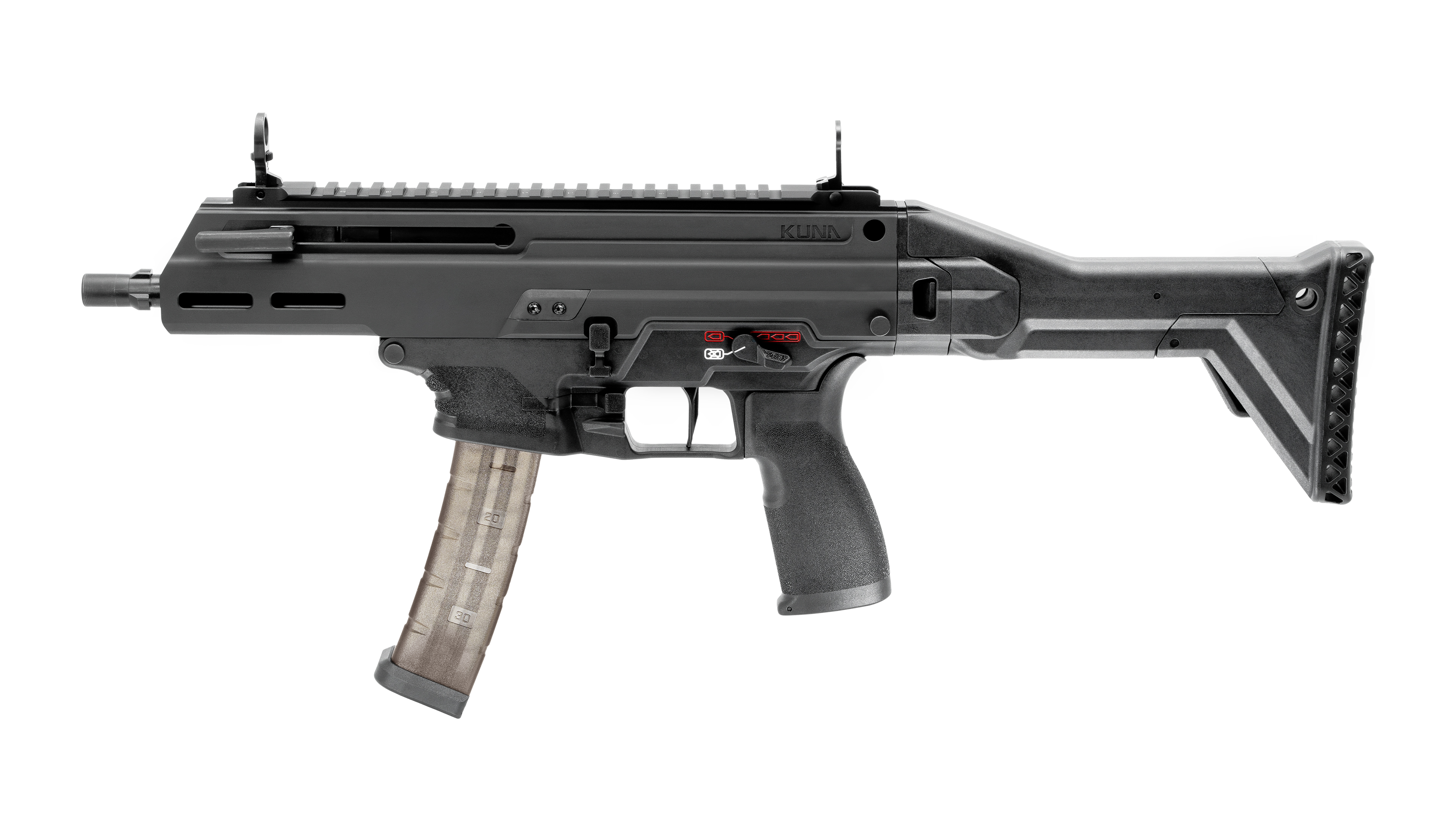
- Type: Submachine gun
- Place of origin: Croatia

Service history
- Used by: See Users

Production history
- Designed: 2020
- Manufacturer: HS Produkt
- Produced: 2024

Specifications
- Cartridge: 9×19mm Parabellum.40 S&W
- Action: Roller-delayed blowback
- Feed system: Detachable box magazine

HS Produkt Kuna (lit. 'Marten') is a Croatian submachine gun designed and manufactured by HS Produkt which is available in both 9x19mm Parabellum and .40 S&W.

The Kuna is available in a semi-automatic version for commercial and civilian sales, and as a select-fire sub-machine gun for military, law enforcement and government sales.

== History ==
Development on the Kuna began in 2020 as a commercial project.

The Kuna appeared first at the COP Internacional trade show in Sao Paulo in 2024 after HS Produkt won a contract with the Sao Paulo Military Police.

Later in 2025, it was revealed at EnforceTac 2025 and IWA OutdoorClassics 2025 under Springfield Armory branding.

== Design ==
The Kuna was designed for the .40 S&W caliber and to withstand the strong pressures of that cartridge in order to obtain a strong and resistant construction and then gradually adapt to the weaker 9x19 mm Parabellum cartridge.

One of the key details in the design is the single-roller delayed-blowback locking system. This leads to higher accuracy, less vibration and longer service life.

== Users ==
- Brazil
- Croatia
