= Sarsılmaz Arms =

Turkish small arms manufacturer

Sarsilmaz Silah Sanayi A.Ş.
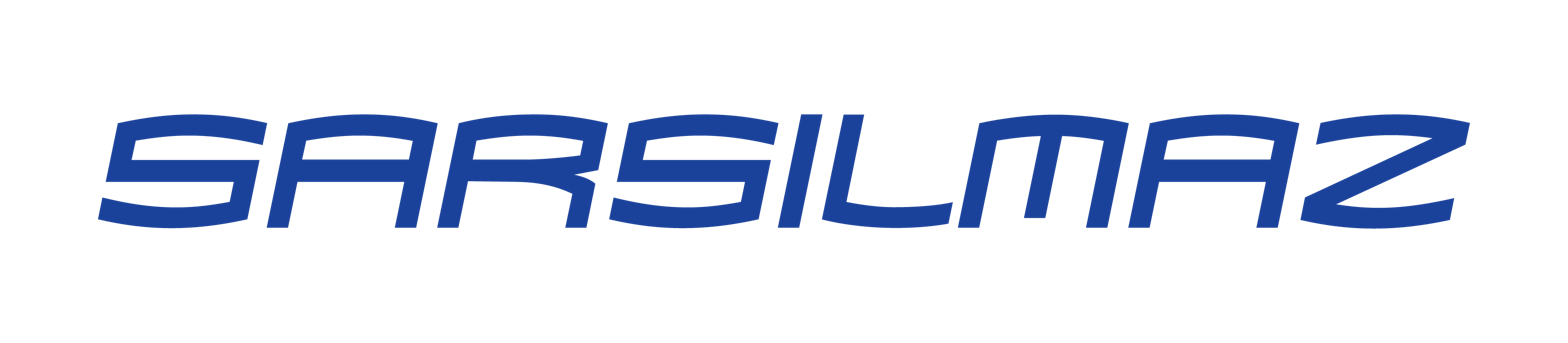

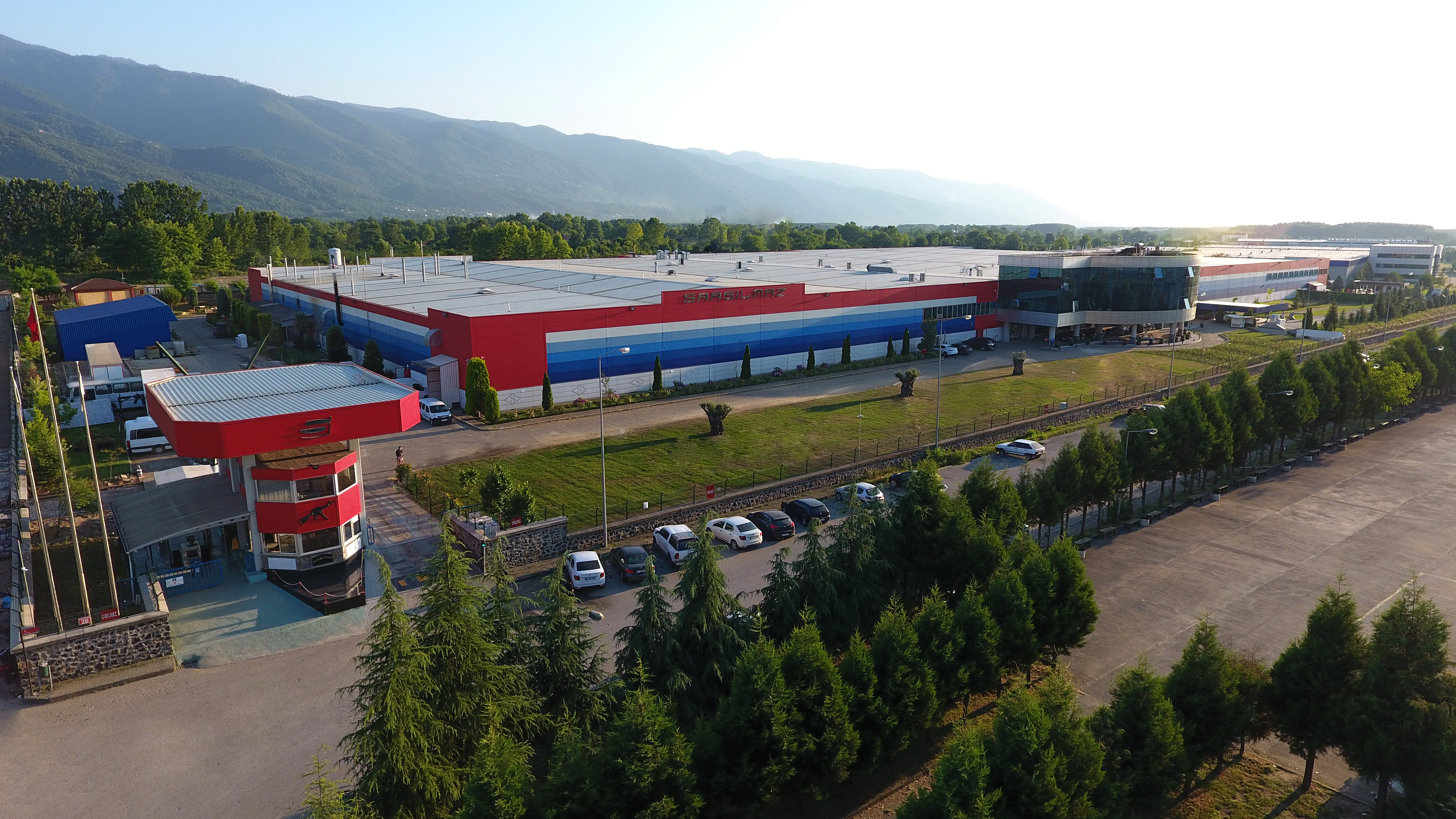
- Sarsilmaz Düzce factory building
- Type: S.A. (corporation)
- Industry: Firearms
- Founded: 1880
- Headquarters: Beyköy and Düzce, Turkey
- Products: Pistols and firearms
- Subsidiaries: SAR USA
- Website: www.sarsilmaz.com

Sarsılmaz Silah Sanayi A.Ş. (lit. 'Unshakable Arms Industries'), commonly referred to as Sar or Sars by English speakers, is a privately owned small arms manufacturer based in Düzce, Turkey. The company was founded in 1880 in the Ottoman Empire, and is the largest small arms manufacturer in Turkey.

Sarsilmaz is the official pistol supplier and producer of many of the small arms for the Turkish National Police and the Turkish Armed Forces, and exports firearms to 78 countries. In addition to their small arms manufacturing, Sarsilmaz entered the aviation components industry under the name TR Mekatronik in 2013, and has become one of the largest subcontractors in the sector.

Sarsilmaz firearms were formerly imported into the United States by E.A.A. In 2018 Sarsilmaz founded SAR USA to be the exclusive importer and distributor for Sarsilmaz firearms into the United States.

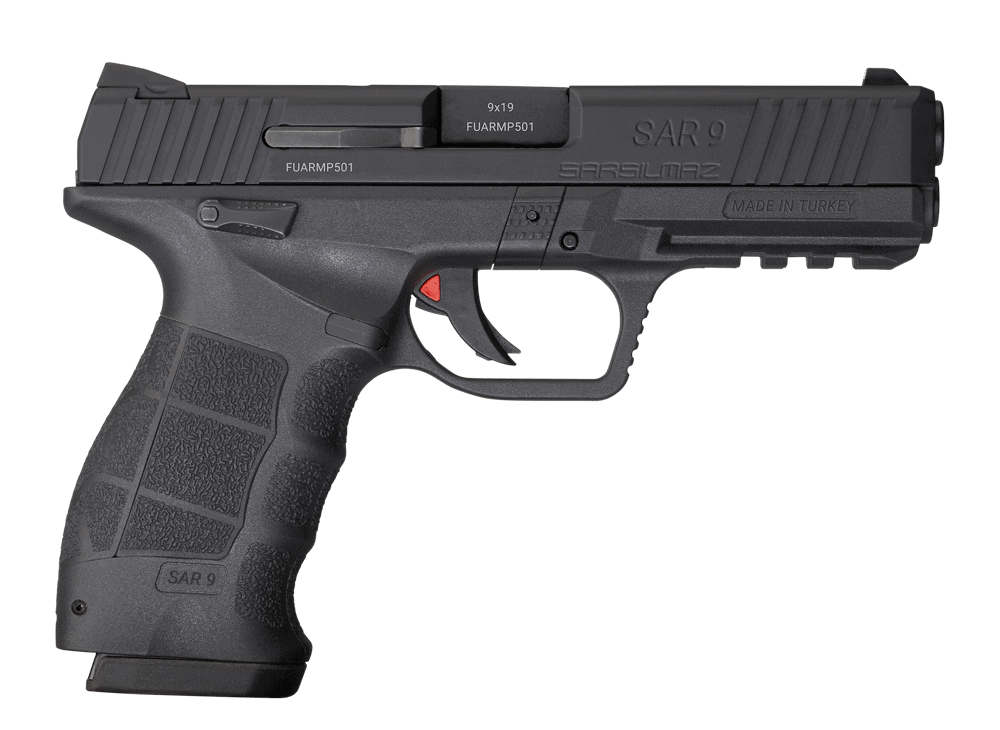
Sarsilmaz SAR9 9x19mm

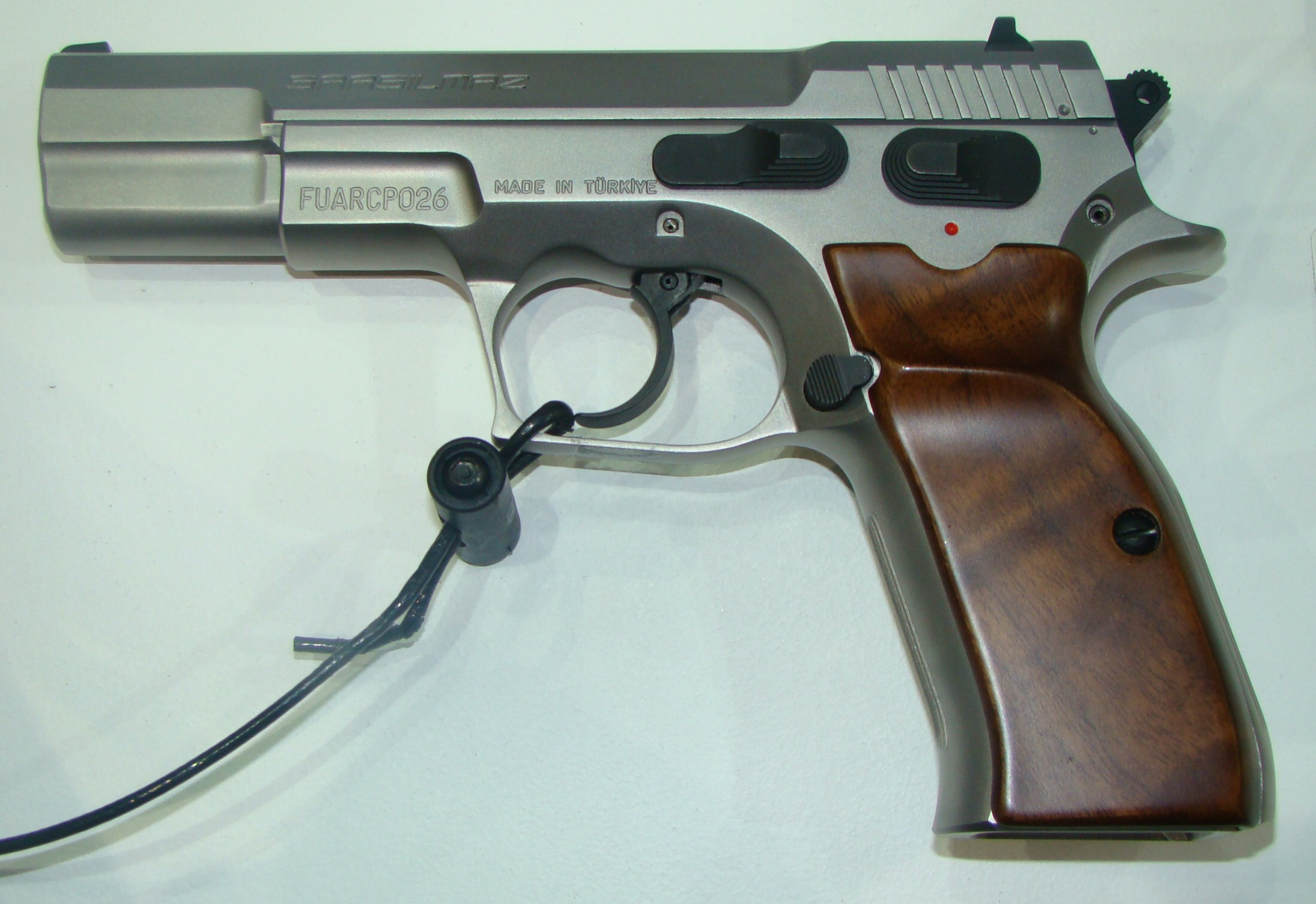
Sarsilmaz Kilinc 2000 Mega 9x19mm pistol

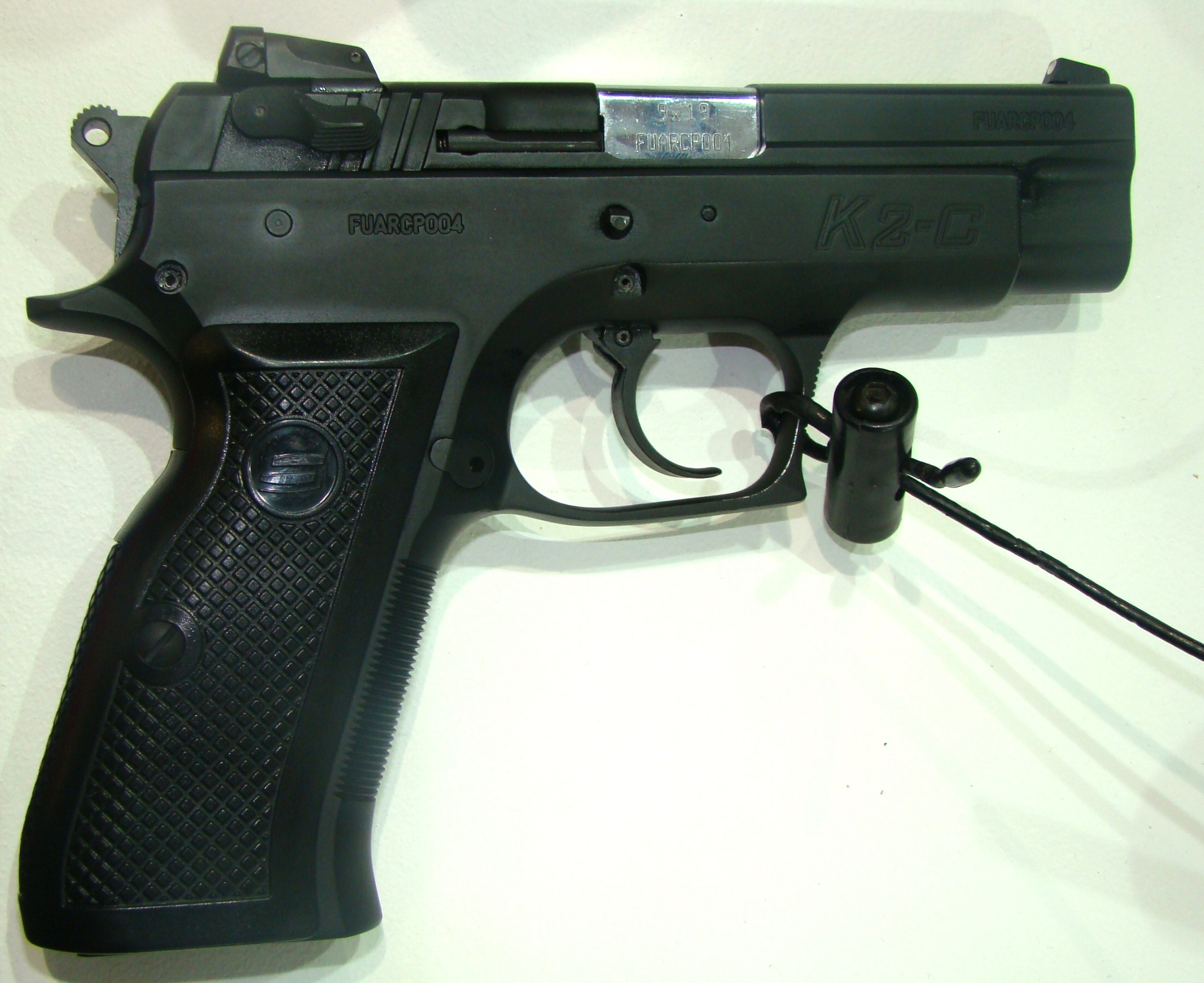
Sarsilmaz K2C pistol

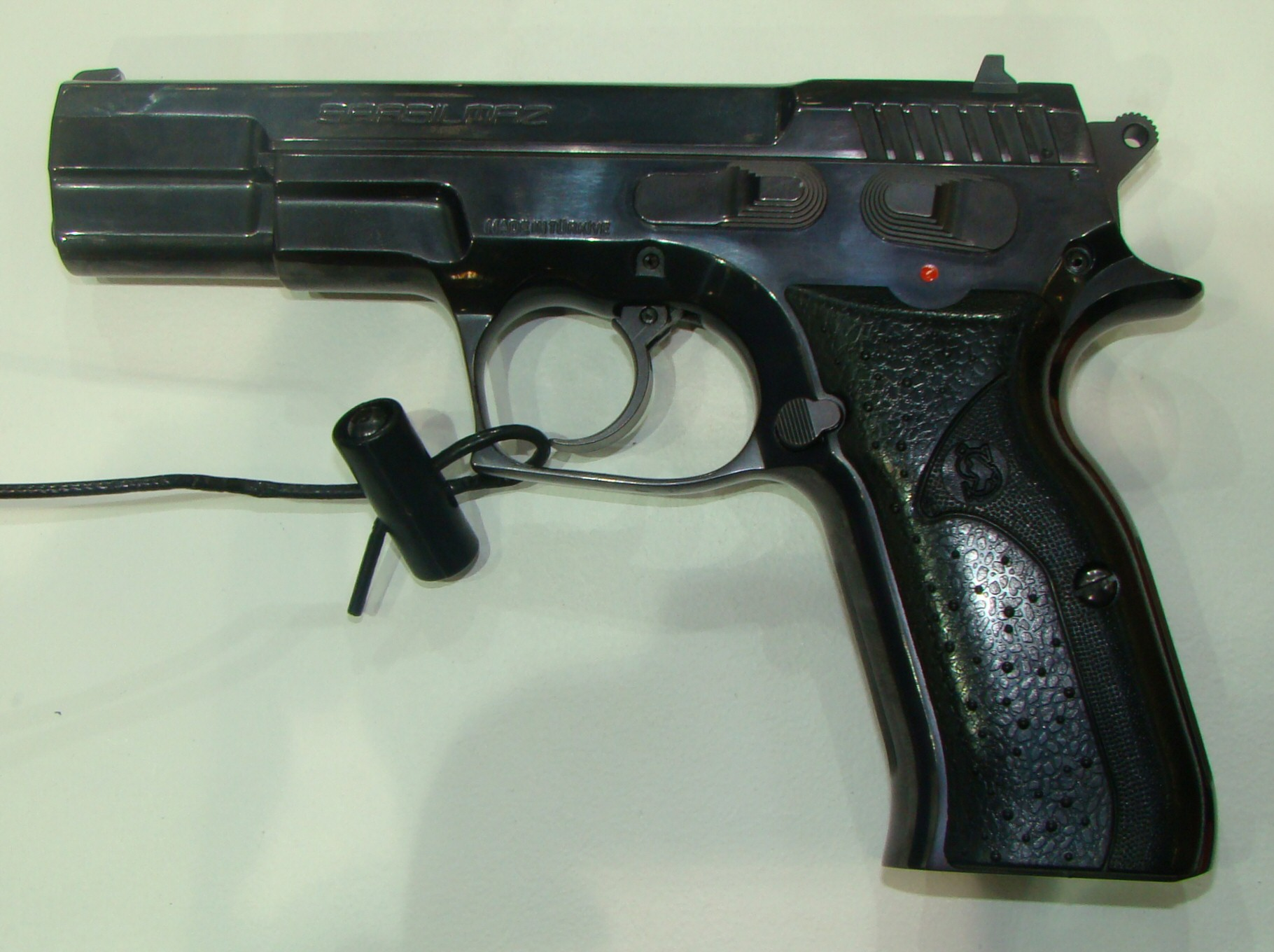
Sarsilmaz Kilinc 2000 Mega pistol (polished titanium)

== Products ==
=== Handguns ===
==== Semi Automatic ====
- B6
- B6C
- CM9
- CM9 Gen 2
- ST9
- ST9-S/SS
- SAR9 - NOT Based on the VP9. Based on a Gen3 Glock with the grip panels being inspired by the VP9.
- ST10
- K11
- K10C
- P8L
- P8S
- K2-45
- K2C
- K12
- K12 Sport/X
- Kılınç 2000 - Licensed CZ 75
- AR-24
- AR-24K

==== Revolvers ====
- SR-38 - S&W clone

=== Hunting Rifles and Shotguns ===
==== Semi-Automatic ====
- Magic
- Magic Slug
- SA-W 700 series
- SA-X 700 series
- Franchi
- M204 series
- M206 W
- M212

==== Over and Under Shotguns ====
- SP-WSS 512 Noble
- SP-W 512 Chic
- SP-W 512 Bella
- SP-WS 512
- SP-XS 512

==== Trap Shooting ====
- SP-512 Trap
- SP-512 Double Trap
- SP-512 Skeet

=== Submachine Guns ===
- SAR 109T - adopted by Turkish Army in 2014.
- SAR 109C
- TE 54

=== Infantry Rifles ===
- SAR 223P - Turkish produced AR-15/M16 clone
- SAR 223T
- SAR 223C
- SAR 308 - AK-47 clone
- SAR 15T - AK-47 clone
- SAR 56 - AR style rifle designed for Police Special Operation Department
- MPT 76 SH - Hk417 based

=== Machine Guns ===
- SAR 127 PMT - Licensed M2 Browning
- SAR 762 MT - Based on M240B

=== Armed Robot Dogs/Quadrupedal Unmanned Ground Vehicles (Q-UGVs) equipped with weapons ===
SARBOT is an armed robotic ground system developed by Sarsılmaz as part of its expansion into autonomous and unmanned defense technologies. The system was introduced at major defense industry exhibitions, including SAHA EXPO and IDEF, where it was presented as a next-generation robotic platform for military and security applications.

SARBOT is designed for remote-controlled or semi-autonomous operation and can be equipped with modular payloads, including weapon systems and sensor suites, depending on mission requirements. It is intended for use in reconnaissance, surveillance, perimeter security, and operations in high-risk environments where deploying personnel may be hazardous.

The platform reflects Sarsılmaz’s broader strategic shift from traditional small arms manufacturing toward integrated defense systems, including robotics and autonomous solutions.
