= MUGEM =

Class of Turkish aircraft carriers under construction

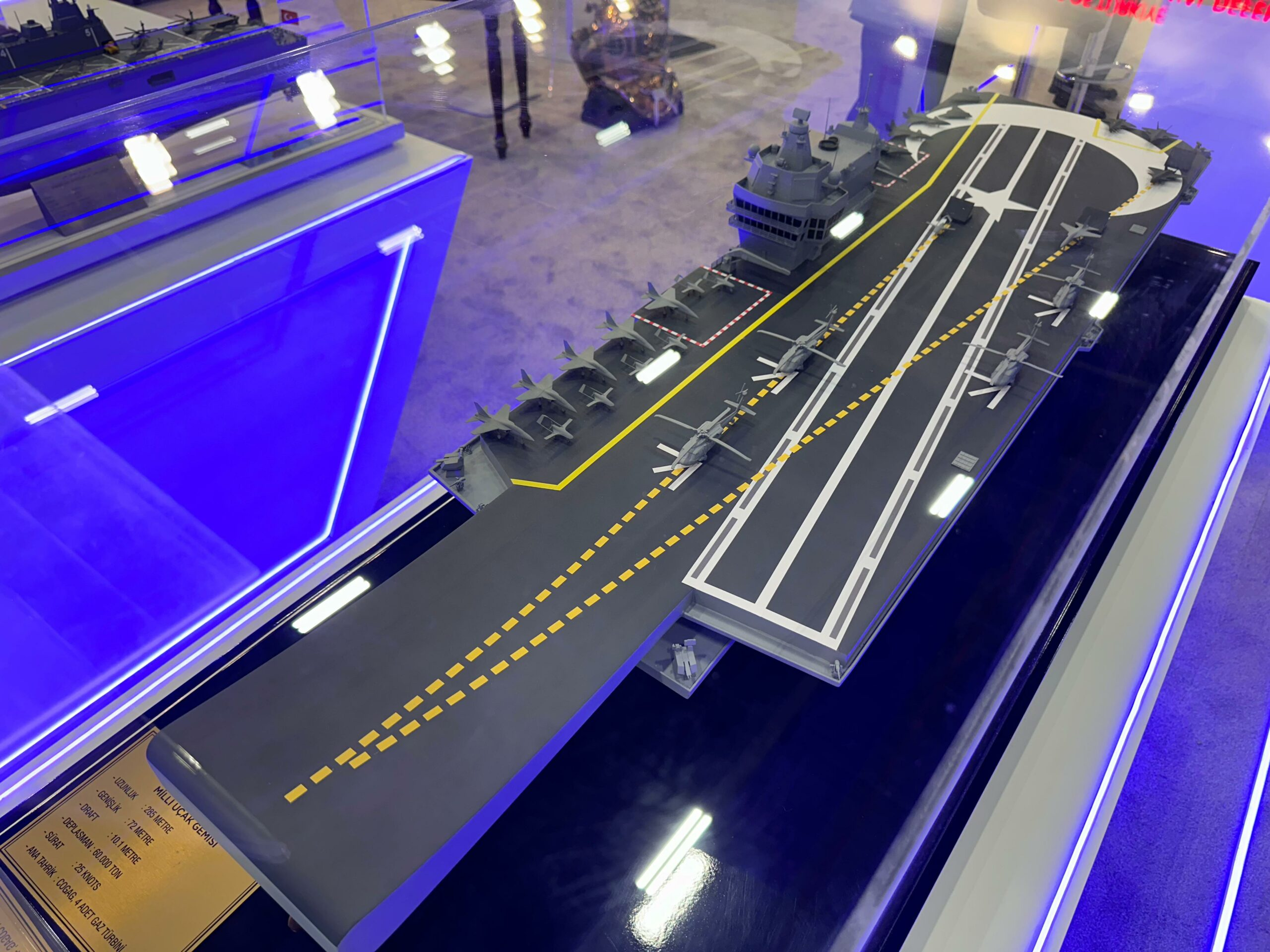
- MUGEM-class aircraft carrier scaled model

Class overview
- Name: Milli Uçak Gemisi (National Aircraft Carrier)
- Builders: Istanbul Naval Shipyard
- Operators: Turkish Naval Forces
- Preceded by: Anadolu class
- Building: 1

General characteristics
- Type: Aircraft carrier
- Displacement: >60,000 t (59,000 long tons)
- Length: 285 m (935 ft 0 in)
- Beam: 72 m (236 ft 3 in)
- Draught: 10.1 m (33 ft 2 in)
- Installed power: Integrated hybrid electric power system (HVDC backbone)
- Propulsion: 2 × GE LM6000 gas turbines + 4 × MTU 20V 4000 + 4 × GE APMM (Advanced Permanent Magnet Machine) (IFEP-like integrated electric propulsion) + 2 x CPP
- Speed: 26 knots (48 km/h; 30 mph)+ (maximum)
- Range: 10,000 nmi (19,000 km; 12,000 mi)
- Crew: 800+ Embarked Personnel: 950. Up to 2,500 total personnel accommodation (crew + air wing + embarked force + mission staff) ROLE 2+ naval hospital capability (surgical suites, intensive care units, triage ward, burn treatment, trauma stabilization, medical evacuation coordination)
- Armament: 32 (2x16) cell MiDLAS vertical launching system; 4 × GOKDENIZ CIWS; 7 × STOP RWS
- Aircraft carried: 25x Aircraft, 3x Helicopters, 15x UAV
- Aviation facilities: 15x Aircraft, 3x Helicopters 5x UAV, 2x Aircraft Lifts, USV, UUV.

MUGEM is an initiative by the Turkish Navy to build a fully indigenous aircraft carrier. MUGEM is a Turkish acronym for Milli Uçak Gemisi, meaning "National Aircraft Carrier". The construction of the first MUGEM-class aircraft carrier started on 2 January 2025.

== Development ==
Plans for constructing a large Turkish aircraft carrier were first announced in April 2023 by the president of Turkey, Recep Tayyip Erdoğan, who held talks with companies from Spain and the United Kingdom on the issue. Contrary to earlier assumptions and news reports by the media, it was later revealed that the future aircraft carrier would not be a larger version of TCG Anadolu, but a completely new design.

On 15 February 2024, the Design and Projects Office of the Turkish Navy announced that it will be a STOBAR aircraft carrier with an overall length of 285 metres (935 ft 0 in), beam of 72 m (236 ft 3 in), draught of 10.1 metres (33 ft 2 in), and displacement of 60,000 tonnes (59,000 long tons). It is to have a CODLAG propulsion system and a maximum speed of more than 26 knots (30 mph; 48 km/h). In terms of dimensions (length, beam, and draught) it is similar to the Queen Elizabeth-class aircraft carrier of the Royal Navy, but has a lower displacement. (Note: The type of displacement has not been explicitly revealed in the specifications, possibly due to the ongoing evaluation of the aircraft, unmanned combat aerial vehicles, and helicopters to be used, which will determine a more precise estimation for the full load displacement.)

On 25 April 2024, new details were released when press was welcomed at the Istanbul Naval Shipyard. A model of the ship was first shown at the 2024 SAHA EXPO, with further details being released, like propulsion, dimensions, and design elements.

The construction of the first MUGEM-class aircraft carrier began on 2 January 2025. The first MUGEM-class aircraft carrier is being built at the Istanbul Naval Shipyard.

On 22 April 2026, new details were released when press was welcomed at the Navtek Naval Technologies Inc.

At the Combined Naval Event (CNE) 2026 held in Farnborough, United Kingdom, between 19 and 21 May 2026, Rear Admiral Hakan Uçar, Commander of the Turkish Navy Naval Technical Command, presented an updated overview of the MUGEM aircraft carrier project. The presentation included revised technical specifications, development progress, and an updated project timeline.

According to the briefing, the MUGEM program was initiated in 2023 with Concept of Operations (CONOPS) development, feasibility studies, and analysis of alternatives. This was followed by project definition and concept design phases, with preliminary design activities completed prior to the transition into detailed and contract design phases scheduled for 2026. Construction activities are currently underway, with system integration, testing, and verification phases planned to follow. The vessel is expected to be delivered in 2032.

The updated design parameters presented at CNE 2026 include a length of 285 metres, a beam of 72 metres, a draught of 10.1 metres, and a displacement of approximately 60,000 tonnes. The ship is designed to achieve a maximum speed of 26+ knots, a cruising speed of 14 knots, and a range of 10,000 nautical miles at cruising speed. Accommodation capacity was stated as up to 2,500 personnel.

The carrier is configured to operate a total air wing of 52 aircraft. The planned air complement includes the Hürjet (naval variant), Kızılelma unmanned combat aerial vehicle, Anka-3 flying wing unmanned combat aerial vehicle, and TB3 unmanned aerial vehicle. The launch and recovery configuration is based on a STOBAR system, utilising a ski-jump ramp with a 12-degree angle. The flight deck layout includes three take-off runways and a landing area, and is described as being compatible with indigenous aircraft.

A new operational concept referred to as the “Multi-Domain Carrier” was introduced in the presentation. Under this concept, the vessel is intended to support not only airborne operations but also the deployment and recovery of unmanned surface vehicles (USVs) and unmanned underwater vehicles (UUVs). The command and control architecture is designed for network-centric operations integrating both manned and unmanned systems. The combat management system is based on the indigenous ADVENT AI system.

Hydrodynamic and engineering development work for the platform is ongoing. This includes towing tank experiments, computational fluid dynamics (CFD) analysis, and air wake studies conducted in cooperation with Middle East Technical University (ODTÜ). Propeller design is being developed in-house by the Turkish Naval Design Project Office, with testing and optimisation processes aimed at achieving improved efficiency and reduced acoustic signature. Seakeeping analysis indicates that the vessel is designed to support flight operations up to Sea State 6 conditions.

The sensor and combat systems suite is planned to consist entirely of domestically produced systems. These include the ÇAFRAD multi-functional radar system, X-Band, Ku-Band, and Ka-Band satellite communication systems, infrared search and track systems, laser electronic warfare systems, and electronic support and electronic attack systems. The self-defence armament configuration includes two 16-cell MİDLAS vertical launch system modules, three close-in weapon systems (CIWS), four remote-controlled weapon stations, and two point defence missile systems.

The vessel is also designed with expanded logistics and medical capabilities. These include a Role 2 Enhanced medical facility with surgical rooms, dental clinics, intensive care units, burn treatment facilities, radiology units, isolation rooms, and inpatient wards. Additional logistics features include vehicle handling ramps located at the stern and starboard side.

Construction of the vessel is currently in progress at Istanbul Naval Shipyard, as confirmed in the presentation materials shown at CNE 2026.

=== Flight deck ===
MUGEM is being designed in a STOBAR configuration with a modular ski-jump at the bow. The Turkish defence industry is also underway at developing an indigenous catapult system. With the ski-jump being modular by design, this can be removed and the ship could be reconfigured as a CATOBAR carrier.

=== Aircraft ===
The ship is planned to carry several different types of aircraft, both manned and unmanned.

Potential aircraft include:

- Bayraktar TB3
- Bayraktar Kızılelma
- TAI Anka-3
- TAI Hürjet

=== Surface Unmanned Vehicles (USVs) and Underwater Unmanned Vehicles (UUVs) ===
MUGEM is designed as a multi-domain carrier with planned integration of unmanned surface and underwater vehicles to support network-centric maritime operations.

ASELSAN USV and UUV Systems

- ALBATROS Series: The ALBATROS family (Aselsan Albatros-K and Aselsan Albatros-S consists of unmanned surface vehicles developed for reconnaissance, surveillance and swarm operations.
- MARLIN USV: TCB Marlin SİDA is a multi-role unmanned surface vehicle developed for intelligence, surveillance, reconnaissance (ISR), anti-surface warfare, anti-submarine warfare and electronic warfare missions. It features a modular payload system.
- TUFAN USV: TUFAN is a high-speed unmanned surface vehicle developed for rapid autonomous operations.
- Kiliç UUV Family: The KILIÇ family consists of kamikaze autonomous underwater vehicles developed by ASELSAN. It includes KILIÇ 10 (light-class) and KILIÇ 200 (medium-class) variants designed for underwater strike missions.
- Deringöz AUV Family: The Deringöz family consists of autonomous underwater vehicles developed by ASELSAN for underwater ISR and Mine Countermeasure missions.

HAVELSAN USV Systems

- SANCAR USV: Sancar SİDA is an unmanned surface vehicle developed for ISR, Surface Warfare, and Mine Countermeasure (MCM) missions. It is integrated with the ADVENT combat management system.
- ÇAKA USV: ÇAKA is a hybrid unmanned surface vehicle concept developed for multi-domain maritime operations.
- USV-12: USV-12 is a small-class unmanned surface vehicle developed for coastal surveillance and modular roles.

DEARSAN USV Systems

- SALVO AUSV:SALVO is capable of ISR, Surface Warfare, and drone-assisted roles.

STM Unmanned Systems

- NETA Series (UUV): The NETA family consists of autonomous underwater vehicles developed for mine countermeasures, reconnaissance and seabed mapping.
- YAKTU USV: YAKTU is a high-speed unmanned surface vehicle developed by STM.

METEKSAN ULAQ Family

- ULAQ Series: The ULAQ family includes modular unmanned surface vehicles developed in configurations for ISR, electronic warfare and anti-surface warfare roles.
- ULAQ KAMA: ULAQ KAMA is a high-speed unmanned surface vehicle concept developed for autonomous missions.

MKE USV Systems

- PİRANA KUSV: PİRANA is a kamikaze-type unmanned surface vehicle developed by MKE for high-speed autonomous strike missions.

== Construction ==
The construction of the first MUGEM-class aircraft carrier began on 2 January 2025.

== See also ==
- List of aircraft carriers in service

Equivalent aircraft carriers of the same era

- Queen Elizabeth class
- Type 003
