= ULAQ =

Turkish unmanned combat surface vehicle

History

Turkey
- Name: ULAQ
- Namesake: Turkish: ulak for government official envoy
- Status: Prototype

Class overview
- Builders: Ares Shipyard, Meteksan Defense Systems
- Operators: Turkish Navy, Qatari Emiri Navy

General characteristics
- Type: Rigid boat
- Length: 11 m (36 ft)
- Speed: 35 kn (65 km/h; 40 mph)
- Range: 216 nmi (400 km; 249 mi)
- Capacity: 2,000 kg (4,400 lb)
- Armament: 4x Roketsan Cirit, 2x L-UMTAS; 4x ATMACA

ULAQ is the prototype of the first Turkish armed unmanned surface vessel (AUSV).

== Background ==
ULAQ, a derivation of Turkish: ulak for government official envoy, is the first of a series of AUSVs of Turkey, which was developed for the Turkish Navy by Ares Shipyard and Meteksan Defense Systems. The design studies completed by August 2020, and the prototype was launched on 12 February 2021 in Antalya. It was planned that firing tests with guided missiles of Roketsan would be carried out by March 2021. On 25 May 2021, the vessel successfully completed its first firing test. The Roketsan Cirit missile fired from the vessel destroyed the target with pinpoint accuracy.

== Characteristics ==
The vessel can be deployed from combat ships. She can be controlled remotely from mobile vehicles, headquarters, command centers and floating platforms. It serves in missions such as reconnaissance, surveillance and intelligence, surface warfare, asymmetric warfare, armed escort and force protection, and strategic facility security. It is planned that the vessel will operate jointly with other AUSVs, armed UAVs and aircraft, and instantly transmit images and other data she obtains to provide major benefits to the operational capability of the Turkish Armed Forces.

The ULAQ AUSV will come in 6 different variants each with its own type of mission and armament

Made of advanced composite material, the boat is 11 m (36 ft) long and has a payload capacity of 2,000 kg (4,400 lb). She has a range of 216 nmi (400 km; 249 mi) and a cruise speed of 35 kn (65 km/h; 40 mph). She is operable at rough sea (sea state 5: 2.5–4 m (8.2–13.1 ft) wave height). She has indigenous encrypted communications and day/night vision capabilities. She is resistant to electronic warfare and is equipped with an Anti-GPS jammer device.

=== Armament ===
The ULAQ family has a modular design that allows different weapon, equipment and deployment configurations according to mission requirements.

Name	Mission	Armament / Equipment / Deployment
ULAQ Surface Combat / ASuW	Anti-surface warfare	4× L-UMTAS or 2× L-UMTAS + 2× CIRIT missiles
ULAQ Anti-ship	Anti-ship warfare	4× ATMACA anti-ship missiles
ULAQ-11 Series	Port security, Anti-surface warfare, Anti-drone warfare, C2, MUM-T	Modular remote weapon systems (typically 12.7 mm machine gun)
ULAQ ISR & EW	Intelligence, surveillance, reconnaissance and electronic warfare	Unarmed
ULAQ-12 Series	Anti-surface warfare (ASuW), Anti-submarine warfare (ASW), Anti-drone warfare	2× ORKA lightweight torpedoes + 12 sonobuoys
ULAQ-15 Series	Mine countermeasures (MCM), Anti-submarine warfare (ASW), Long-range anti-surface warfare (ASuW)	Modular weapon systems (specific configuration not publicly detailed)
ULAQ-14	Intelligence, surveillance and reconnaissance (ISR), Search and rescue (SAR), Maritime security (MS)	Unarmed / Light armament options
ULAQ-6 KAMA	Expendable high-speed strike / swarm	Warhead up to 200 kg explosives
ULAQ FiFi	Firefighting	Firefighting monitors and equipment
ULAQ MCMV	Mine countermeasures	Mine detection and disposal systems

ULAQ bears similarities to the Fleet-class common USV of Textron Systems, USA and the Protector USV of Rafael Advanced Defense Systems, Israel.

== Operators ==
- Turkey
  - Turkish Navy
- Qatar
  - Qatari Emiri Navy

== See also ==
- Aselsan Tufan
- Sancar SİDA
- TCB Marlin SİDA
- Aselsan Albatros-S
- Aselsan Albatros-K
- MKE Pirana USV
- STM YAKTU USV
- Dearsan Salvo AUSV
- Havelsan USV-12
- Havelsan ÇAKA S-KUSV
