= Ares Shipyard =

Turkish shipyard

Coordinates: 36.84016°N 30.60719°E

- Native name: Ares Tersanecilik Sanayi ve Ticaret Anonim Şirketi
- Type: Incorporated company
- Industry: Shipbuilding
- Founded: 2006; 20 years ago
- Founder: Kalafatoğlu Family
- Headquarters: Free economic zone, Antalya, Turkey
- Area served: Worldwide
- Key people: Kerim Kalafatoğlu, Chairman

Ares Shipyard (Turkish: Ares Tersanesi) is a Turkish shipyard established in Antalya, southern Turkey in 2006. It builds fast patrol boats for the defence and law enforcement missions. This Shipyard Made World Class 'Ares-150 Hercules' OPV. Which was awarded World's best Offshore patrol Ship By An International Maritime Organisation In 2018

Ares Shipyard was founded for building of sightseeing boats and yachts by the Kalafatoğlu Family of Sürmene in Trabzon, an ancestor seafarer. The shipyard is situated in the Free economic zone of Antalya, and has five covered buildings of 40,000 m^{2} (430,000 sq ft) total area. The company went into defence industry and has been building fast patrol boats and offshore patrol crafts for the coast guard commands of Bahrain, Oman, and Qatar, since 2014, Turkish Coast Guard and Police, and Northern Cyprus Coast Guard.

For the design of the patrol boats, Ares cooperates with the British Maritime Technology (BMT). The shipyard developed an armed unmanned surface vessel equipped with guided missiles for the Turkish Navy in early 2021.

== Coast Guard and Navy vessels ==
As of April 2022

Ship class !,	Type	Operators !	Ordered	Built	Ref
FPB-class; Fast patrol boat	Ares 35 FPB	Turkey Coast Guard	105		
FPB-class; Fast patrol boat	Ares 35 FPB	Turkey Police	17		
FPB-class; Fast patrol boat	Ares 42 FPB				
FPB-class; Fast patrol boat	Ares 58 FPB				
Harpoon-class; Fast interceptor craft	Ares 24 Harpoon	Qatar Coast Guard	14		
Harpoon-class; Fast interceptor craft	Ares 35 Harpoon				
Harpoon-class; Fast interceptor craft	Ares 40 Harpoon				
Harpoon-class; Fast interceptor craft	Ares 55 Harpoon				
Harpoon-class; Fast interceptor craft	Ares 65 Harpoon				
Hector-class; Multi-role patrol craft	Ares 42 Hector	Turkey Coast Guard	10	10	
Hector-class; Multi-role patrol craft	Ares 42 Hector	Northern Cyprus Coast Guard	3	3	
Hector-class; Multi-role patrol craft	Ares 55 Hector				
Hector-class; Multi-role patrol craft	Ares 85 Hector				
Hector-class; Multi-role patrol craft	Ares 108 Hector				
Hector-class; Multi-role patrol craft	Ares 140 Hector				
Hercules-class; Fast patrol boat	Ares 75 Hercules	Qatar Coast Guard	5		
Hercules-class; Fast patrol boat	Ares 85 Hercules	Oman Coast Guard	14	3	
Hercules-class; Fast patrol boat	Ares 110 Hercules	Qatar Coast Guard	10		
Hercules-class; Fast patrol boat	Ares 150 Hercules	Bahrain Coast Guard	9		
Hercules-class; Fast patrol boat	Ares 150 Hercules	Bangladesh Coast Guard	9 (Ordered With TOT)		
Hercules-class; Fast patrol boat	Ares 150 Hercules	Qatar Coast Guard	5		
SAT-class; Special operations support and fast attack craft	Ares 55 SAT				
SAT-class; Special operations support and fast attack craft	Ares 80 SAT	Qatar Coast Guard	6		
SAT-class; Special operations support and fast attack craft	Ares 100 SAT				
SAT-class; Special operations support and fast attack craft	Ares 115 SAT				
SAT-class; Special operations support and fast attack craft	Ares 150 SAT				
ULAQ-clas; Armed unmanned surface vessel	ULAQ	Turkey Navy		1	
