= MKE MPT =

Turkish modular military rifle family

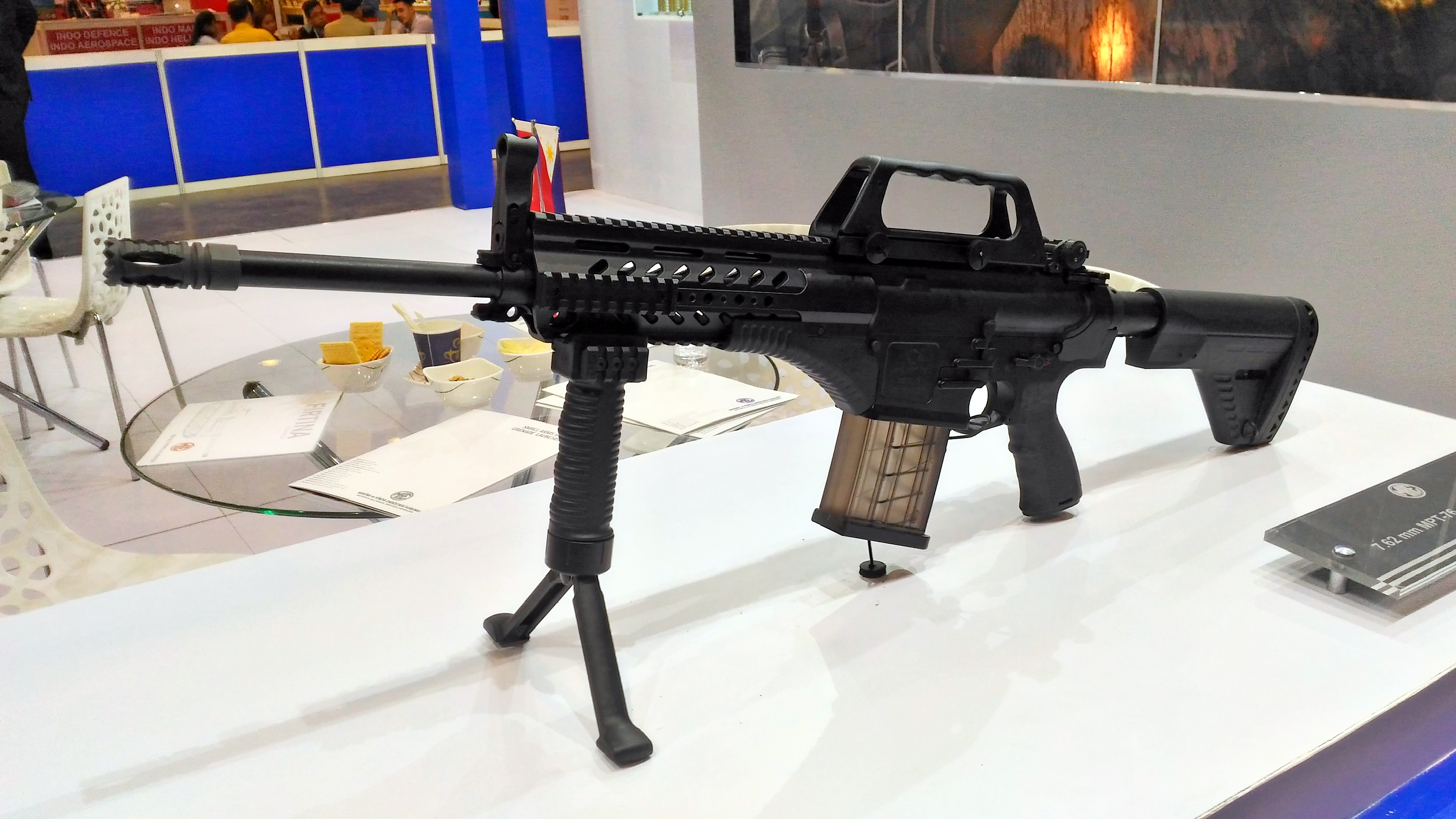
- MKE MPT-76 with a bipod that retracts and doubles as a forward handgrip
- Type: Assault rifle (MPT-55); Battle rifle (MPT-76, MPT-68); Designated marksman rifle (KNT-76); Carbine (KAAN-717)
- Place of origin: Turkey

Service history
- In service: 2014–present
- Used by: See Users
- Wars: Kurdish–Turkish conflict (2015–2025); Syrian civil war; Somali Civil War; Second Libyan Civil War

Production history
- Designer: MKE
- Designed: 2009
- Manufacturer: MKE; Sarsılmaz Arms; Kalekalıp
- Produced: 2014-present
- No. built: 66,000 (MPT-76 and MPT-55, as of 2019)
- Variants: See Variants

Specifications
- Mass: 4.2 kg (9.3 lb) (MPT-76 MT); 3.75 kg (8.3 lb) (MPT-76 MH); 4.00 kg (8.82 lb) (MPT-68); 4.7 kg (10 lb) (KNT-76)
- Length: 920 mm (36 in) (MPT-76); 1,020 mm (40 in) (KNT-76)
- Barrel length: 406 mm (16.0 in) (MPT-76); 406 mm (16.0 in) (MPT-68); 508 mm (20.0 in) (KNT-76)
- Cartridge: 7.62×51mm NATO (MPT-76 and KNT-76); 6.8×51 mm (MPT-68); 5.56×45mm NATO (MPT-55 and MPT-55k)
- Action: Gas-operated short-stroke piston, rotating bolt
- Rate of fire: 700 rounds/min (MPT-76); 800 rounds/min (MPT-68); 200 rounds/min (KNT-76)
- Muzzle velocity: 800 m/s (2,600 ft/s) (MPT-76 and KNT-76); 900 m/s (3,000 ft/s) (MPT-68)
- Effective firing range: 600 m (660 yd) (MPT-76); 800 m (870 yd) (MPT-68); 800 m (870 yd) (KNT-76)
- Feed system: 20 or 30-round detachable magazine
- Sights: Iron sights or various optics

The MPT (Turkish: Millî Piyade Tüfeği, lit. 'National Infantry Rifle') is a family of AR-15–style rifles designed by MKE. It replaces older rifles of the Turkish Armed Forces, such as the Heckler & Koch G3 and HK33. Common manufacturers include MKE, Sarsılmaz Arms and Kalekalıp.

== History ==
After the first prototypes were built in 2008 as the Mehmetçik-1 in 5.56×45mm NATO, the rifle was negatively received.

Turkish soldiers testing it reported that they preferred the 7.62×51mm NATO round which has far greater stopping power and range, similar to those of the existing G3 service rifles. The proposed Mehmetcik-1 was therefore cancelled after the first prototype and engineers started the redesign process.

The MPT made its first public appearance at the Eurosatory 2014, ADEX 2014 and MSPO 2014 events.

The first batch of 200 MPT-76s were delivered on 18 May 2014 and received positive feedback. The rifle was reported by Turkish soldiers to be extremely accurate and reliable, and outmatched the G3 in all categories.

Serial production began in 2015. The initial phase of the project will see a total of 35,014 MPT-76s being produced in two tranches. The first tranche of the initial phase, consisting of 20,000 rifles was contracted to the state-owned company Machines and Chemical Industries Board (MKEK) in June 2015. The second tranche, consisting of 15,014 rifles, was contracted with local company Kalekalip in December 2015.

The first batch of rifles was ready for delivery to the Turkish military in January 2017. Approximately 25,000 MPT-76s had been built by December 2018, with an order for 350,000+ more in 2019.

In May 2024, the MPT was unveiled with a sample rifle chambered in 7.62x39mm.

== Design ==
The MPT is an AR-15-style rifle with a gas piston system based on the HK417, and features a Picatinny rail system and mounting options for an under-barrel shotgun and grenade launcher. It was designed to endure prolonged combat and without maintenance, even under adverse environments, e.g., high altitude, extreme climates and weathers.

The MPT-76 has some ergonomic deviations from what would be considered traditional AR-10 style rifles: the HK417 inspired buttstock must be rotated counter-clockwise about 30 degrees, to adjust the length of pull. An angled foregrip-style plastic mount bridges the transition between the lower receiver and the handguard, and needs to be removed for disassembly.

The charging handle also possesses the retaining latch on the right side of the weapon, not the left, which is typical of most Stoner-derived weapon systems.

== Variants ==
The MPT is produced with multiple barrel length options:

- 16- and 20-inch barrel versions, chambered in 7.62×51mm NATO, as a battle rifle or designated marksman rifle
- 12-inch barrel carbine, chambered in 5.56×45mm NATO

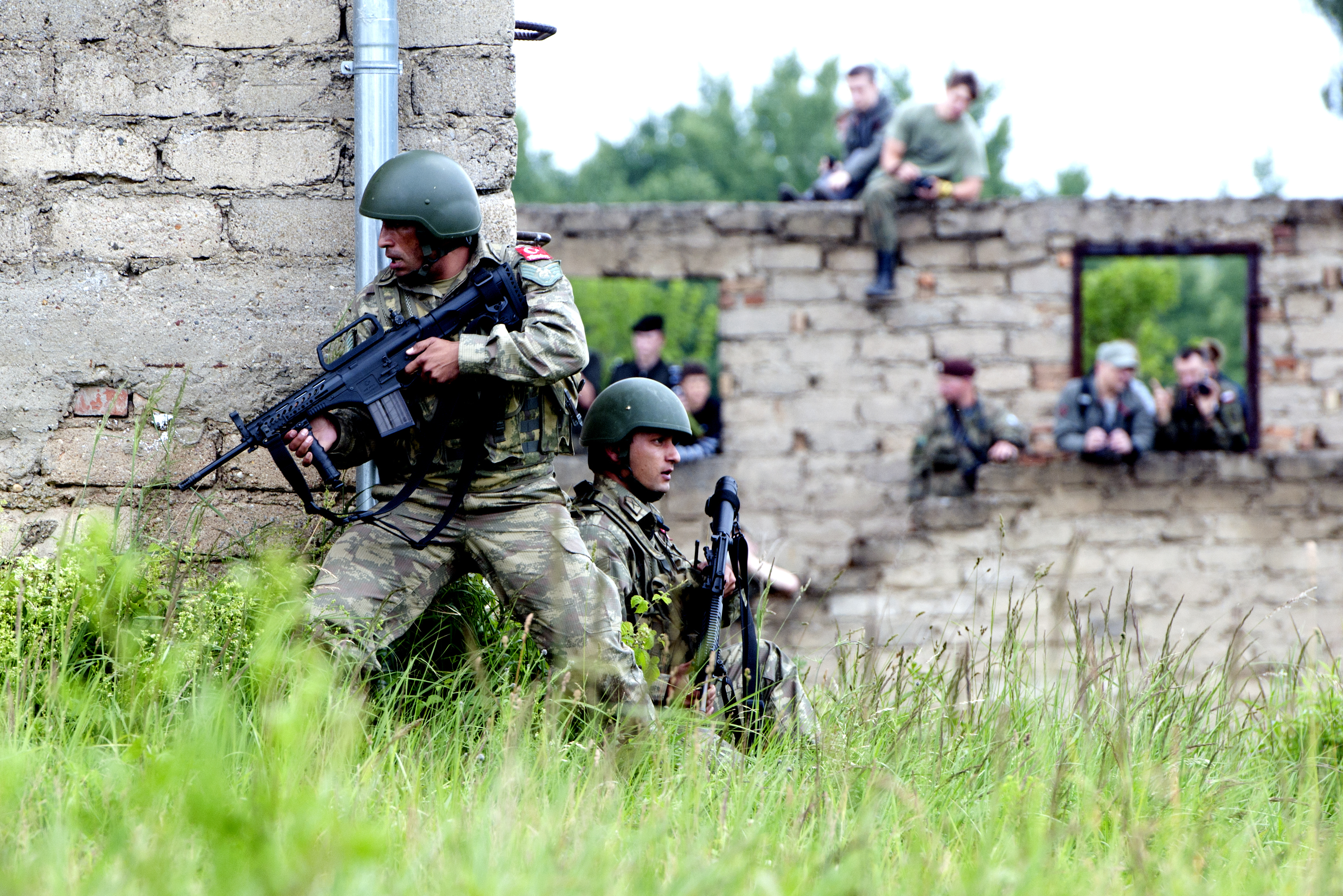
Turkish soldier with MPT during an exercise in Poland in 2016

=== MPT-76-MH ===
The MPT-76-MH is a lightened version of the standard MPT-76. The weight of the rifle has been reduced by 750 g (1.65 lb). The MPT-76's unloaded (without magazine) weight is 4.2 kilograms (9.3 lb).

=== MPT-68 ===
A 2026 variant chambered in 6.8×51mm ammunition.

=== MPT-55 ===
A variant called the MPT-55 was released in 2017, chambered in 5.56×45mm NATO. The standard version is 7.3 lb (3.3 kg) with a 14.5 in (370 mm) barrel, and the shorter MPT-55K is 6.6 lb (3.0 kg) with an 11 in (280 mm) barrel. Turkey planned to obtain 20,000 of the smaller-caliber rifles to replace license-produced HK416s within special forces.

=== KNT-76 ===
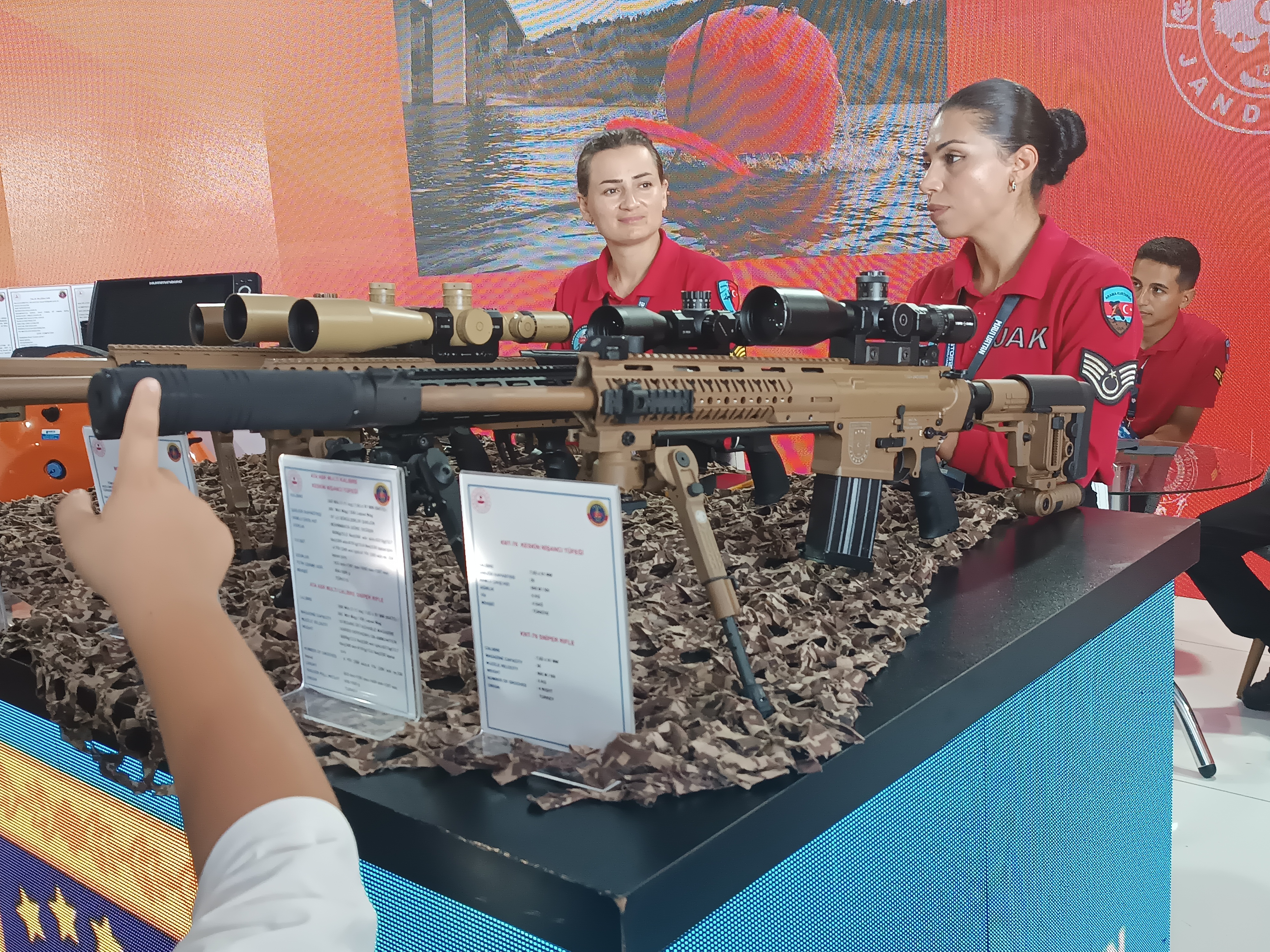
The Turkish Gendarmerie issued KNT-76 at Teknofest 2025

The KNT-76 (Turkish: Keskin Nişancı Tüfeği, lit. 'Sharp Shooter Rifle') is the designated marksman rifle version. It is produced in Kırıkkale Arms Factory like the MPT-76. It fires semi-automatically using the same "Gas Operated Rotary Bolt Action" mechanism as the MPT-76. Trigger sensitivity in the KNT-76 is reduced by five Newtons. The KNT-76 weighs 500 g (18 oz) more that the MPT-76. The effective range is 800 m (870 yd) due to the barrel being extended to 508 mm (20.0 in). Accuracy is 1.5 MOA (1.5 in (38 mm) at 100 yd (91 m)).

=== KAAN-717 ===
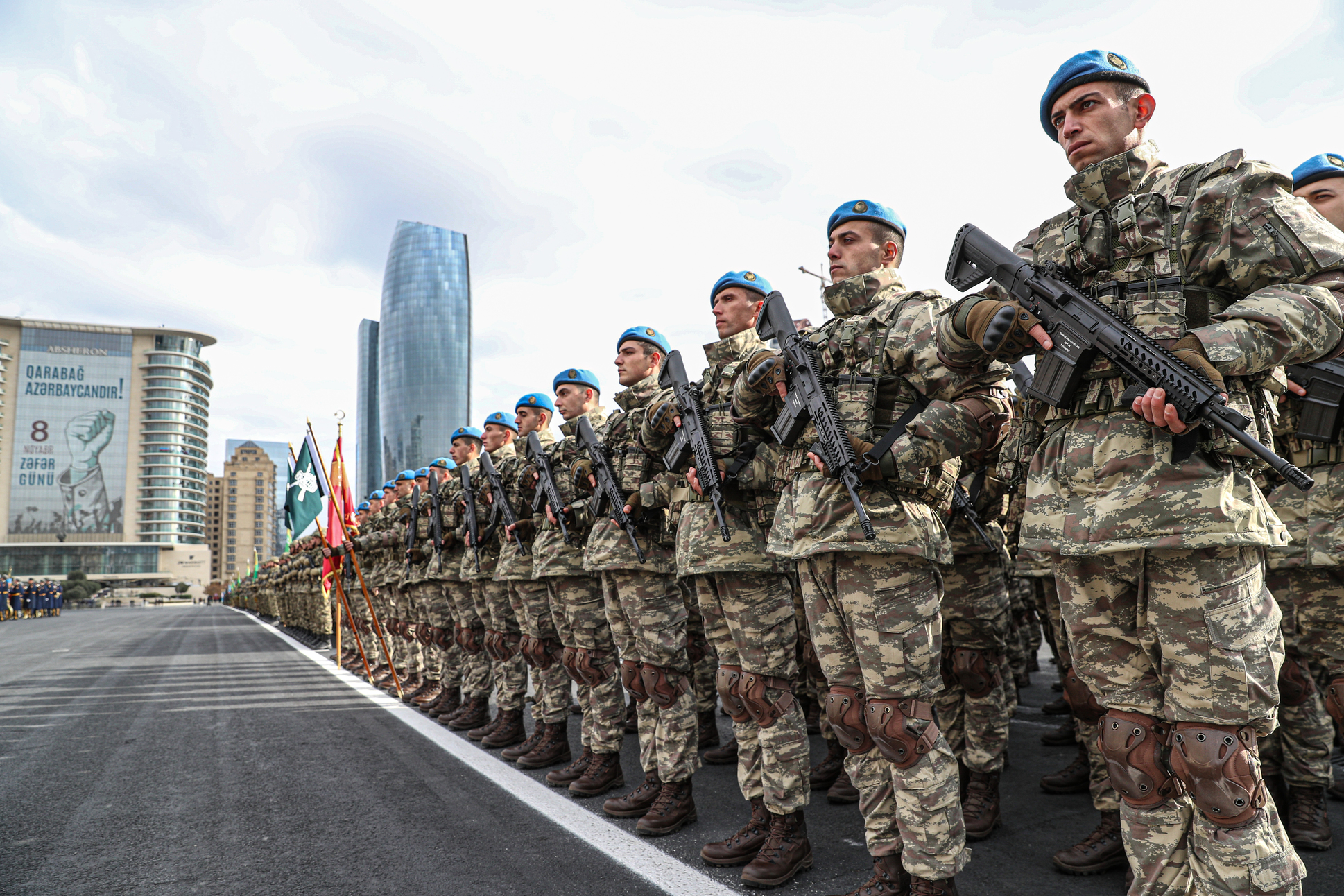
Turkish soldiers on parade in Baku with MPT rifles in 2020

The KAAN-717 is the carbine version, chambered in 7.62x51mm NATO.

Designed for the special forces, it uses a short-stroke action. The KAAN-717 also comes with a different stock with a cheek rest.

== Users ==
- Albania: 30 MPT-76s and 30 MPT-55s
- Cameroon: MPT-76 adopted by the Rapid Intervention Battalion.
- Georgia: Unknown number of KNT-76s and MPT-55s handed over to Georgian special operations forces in 2025
- Kosovo: Kosovo Security Force received PMT-76-57As to mount on SARP equipped armoured vehicles.
- Montenegro: 30 rifles donated by Turkey in 2021
- Peru: MPT-76MH used by Peruvian Special Forces.
- Senegal
- Somalia: 450 rifles delivered, used by Gorgor (Eagle) commandos
- Turkey: 66,000 MPT-76 and MPT-55s as of 2019
