= Kırıkkale MKE Weapons Industry Museum =

Museum in Kırıkkale, Turkey

- Kırıkkale MKE Silah Sanayi üzesi
- Kırıkkale MKE Weapons Industry Museum
- Established: 1993; 33 years ago
- Coordinates: 39°50′48″N 33°30′55″E
- Type: Weapons
- Owner: Mechanical and Chemical Industry Corporation of Turkey

Kırıkkale MKE Weapon Industry Museum (Turkish: MKE Silah Sanayi Müzesi) is a museum in Kırıkkale, Turkey. It is at 39°50′48″N 33°30′55″E. Mechanical and Chemical Industry Corporation (MKE) of Turkey has a weapons factory in Kırıkkale. The museum was established by MKE on 15 July 1990. On 2 November 1993 it was transferred to its current location.

The collection of the museum, as the name implies, is composed of historical (14th-20th centuries) weapons. These weapons are collected from all over Turkey. They are either Turkish or European made. Presently there are 299 weapons in the museum.
