= MKE TAMGEÇ =

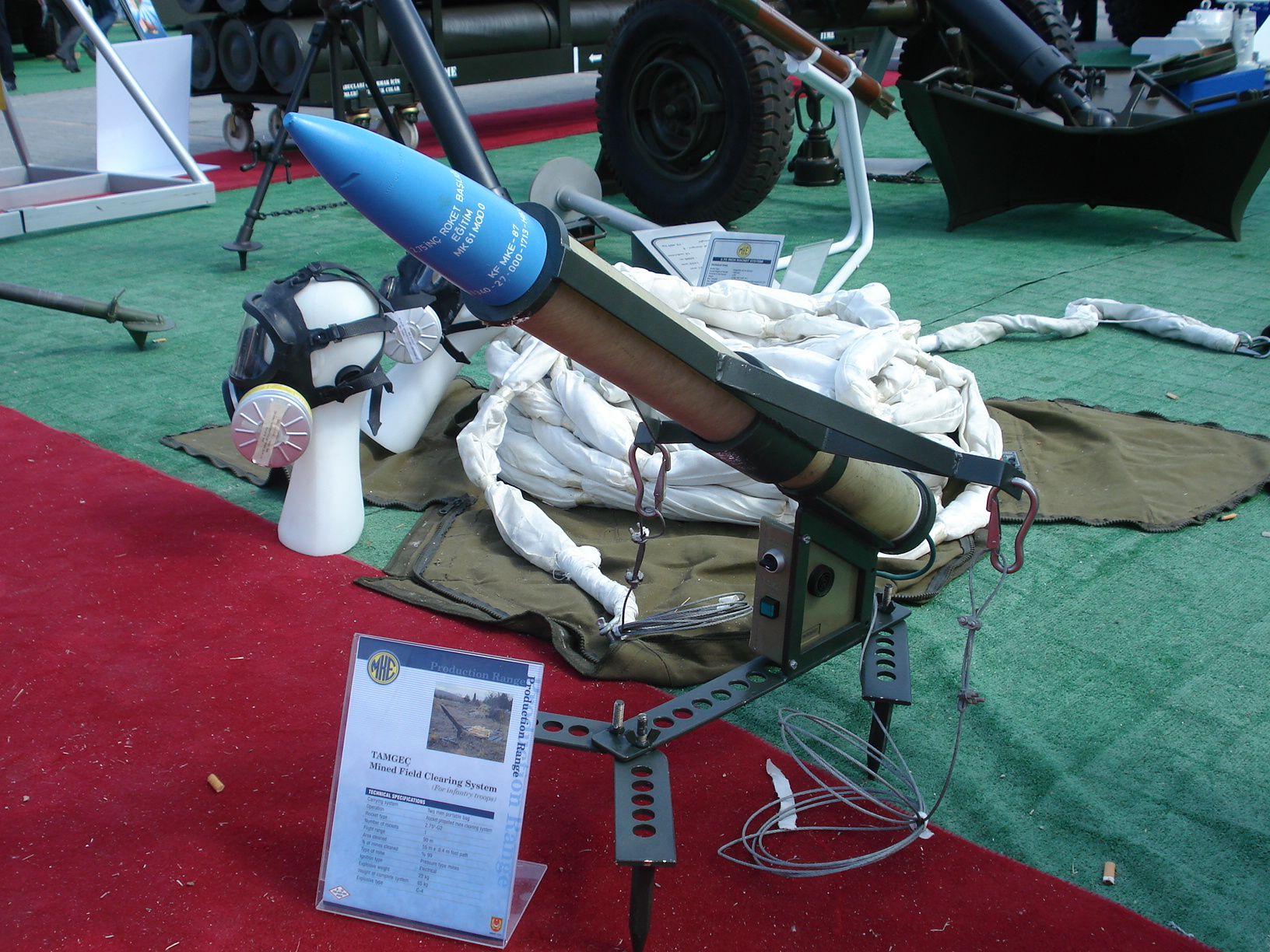
An Tamgeç exhibited at IDEF '07 Defense Industry Fair.

MKE TAMGEÇ is a mine destruction system ( Mine-clearing line charge ) produced by MKEK, consisting of chain explosives attached to the back of a rocket.

When the rocket is activated, it follows a parabola course and the explosives attached to its back follow this course with it. When the rocket falls to the ground, explosives also fall to the ground at the level of a rope and explode when they come into contact with the ground. As a result, a pathway cleared of mines is opened.

MKE TAMGEÇ and MKE TAMKAR actively used by the Turkish armed forces and firstly used during operation Operation Euphrates Shield and Operation Olive Branch.
