= Ares 85 Hercules =

History

Oman
- Name: Ares 85 Hercules
- Namesake: Hercules, Ancient Roman god of strength and heroes
- Status: Active

Class overview
- Name: BV, TL/HSC-N
- Builders: Ares Shipyard
- Operators: Royal Oman Police Coast Guard
- Planned: 14
- Completed: 3
- Active: 3

General characteristics
- Type: Rigid boat
- Displacement: 70 tons
- Length: 25.95 m (85.1 ft)
- Beam: 5.85 m (19.2 ft)
- Draft: 1.20 m (3 ft 11 in)
- Speed: 45 kn (83 km/h; 52 mph), up to 55 kn (102 km/h; 63 mph)
- Complement: Rigid-hull inflatable boat (RHIB)
- Sensors & processing systems: Electro-optical sensors, sea-based X-band Radar
- Armament: Remotely controlled 12.7 mm machine gun

Ares 85 Hercules is a fast patrol boat made in Turkey. Oman ordered 14 boats for its Coast Guard Command.

== Characteristics ==
The fast patrol craft was designed by the Antalya-based Ares Shipyard in cooperation with the British Maritime Technology (BMT), which is experienced in commercial and naval high-performance patrol vessels with lengths ranging from 9 m (30 ft) to 220 m (720 ft).

Made of advanced composite material, Ares 85 Hercules was built at Ares Shipyard. She has a length of 25.95 m (85.1 ft), a beam of 5.85 m (19.2 ft), a draft of 1.20 m (3 ft 11 in) with a displacement of 70 tons. She has a cruise speed of 45 kn (83 km/h; 52 mph), up to 55 kn (102 km/h; 63 mph). The ship's class is BV, TL/HSC-N (Bureau Veritas, Turkish Lloyd/High-speed craft - Non-displacement mode). The patrol boat features a stabilized weapon station of a remotely controlled 12.7 mm machine gun. The patrol craft is equipped with electro-optical sensors, sea-based X-band Radar and radşo systems. She carries a rigid-hull inflatable boat (RHIB) on the poop deck for use in boarding a ship and search and rescue missions.

== Operators ==
- , the Royal Oman Police Coast Guard ordered on 13 November 2018 a total of 14 boats to deploy against illegal immigration and drug trafficking. The first two boats were delivered by mid December 2019.
