= Ares 110 Hercules =

History

Qatar
- Name: Ares 110 Hercules
- Namesake: Hercules, Ancient Roman god of strength and heroes
- Status: Active

Class overview
- Builders: Ares Shipyard
- Operators: Royal Qatar Coast Guard
- Planned: 10
- Completed: 10
- Active: 10

General characteristics
- Type: Rigid boat
- Displacement: 130 tons
- Length: 34.47 m (113.1 ft)
- Beam: 7.56 m (24.8 ft)
- Draft: 1.45 m (4 ft 9 in)
- Propulsion: 3 x MTU 12V2000M84 Diesel engines, 3 x Rolls-Royce Kamewa 50A3 series waterjets, 2 x Caterpillar C4.4 Diesel engines as auxiliary
- Speed: Cruise15 kn (28 km/h; 17 mph), Max 32 kn (59 km/h; 37 mph)
- Range: 800 nmi (1,500 km; 920 mi)
- Complement: 1 x Ares 24 Harpoon, rapid reaction boat
- Crew: 7 officers and petties, 16 sailors
- Armament: 2 × Aselsan 12.7 mm Stabilized Machine Gun with IR imaging and remote control capability (STAMP); 1 x Aselsan 30 mm Muhafız, stabilized remotely controlled naval automatic cannon

Ares 110 Hercules is a multi-role fast patrol boat made in Turkey. The Royal Qatar Coast Guard Command ordered and received ten boats of this type.

== Characteristics ==
The fast patrol craft was designed by the Antalya-based Ares Shipyard in cooperation with the British Maritime Technology (BMT), which is experienced in commercial and naval high-performance patrol vessels with lengths ranging from 9 m (30 ft) to 220 m (720 ft).

Ares 110 Hercules was built at Ares Shipyard. She has a length of 34.47 m (113.1 ft), a beam of 7.56 m (24.8 ft), a draft of 1.45 m (4 ft 9 in) with a displacement of 130 tons. She has a cruise speed of 15 kn (28 km/h; 17 mph), max. 32 kn (59 km/h; 37 mph), and a service range of 800 nmi (1,500 km; 920 mi).

The boat is powered by three MTU 12V2000M84 Diesel engines and three Rolls-Royce Kamewa 50A3 series waterjets. There are also two Caterpillar C4.4 Diesel engines as auxiliary.

The patrol boat features two Aselsan 12.7 mm Stabilized Machine Gun with IR imaging and remote control capability (STAMP), as well as one Aselsan 30 mm Muhafız, stabilized remotely controlled naval automatic cannon.

She carries a rapid reaction boat of type Ares 24 Harpoon.

The boat is operated by seven officers and petties, and 16 sailors.

== Operators ==
- , ten boats were built and delivered to the Royal Qatar Coast Guard Commans.
