= Royal Oman Police =

Police force of the Sultanate of Oman

Royal Oman Police شرطة عمان السلطانية

Agency overview
- Formed: 1974

Jurisdictional structure
- Legal jurisdiction: Oman

Operational structure
- Headquarters: Main headquarters in Qurum which also serves as the headquarters for Muscat Governorate Police Command Headquarters. Other regional headquarters are present for: 1. Dhofar Governorate Police Command Headquarters, 2. Musandam Governorate Police Command Headquarters, 3. Al Batinah Region Police Command Headquarters, 4. Al Dahirah Region Police Command Headquarters, 5. Al Dakiliyah Region Police Command Headquarters, 6. Al Sharqiyah Region Police Command Headquarters, 7. Al Wusta Region Police Command Headquarters and 8. Special Task Force Headquarters Seeb Muscat
- Agency executives: Sultan Haitham bin Tariq Al Said, Supreme Commander; Lieutenant General Hassan Mohsin al Shuraiqi, General Inspector

Website
- www.rop.gov.om

The Royal Oman Police (ROP) (Arabic: شرطة عمان السلطانية), also known as Oman Police, is the main law and order agency for the Sultanate of Oman.

== History ==
The concept of a modern police force was relatively new to Oman when Sultan Qaboos bin Said al Said rose to power after overthrowing his father in a palace coup on July 23, 1970. Police in Oman was first institutionalized in the 1700s in Sohar. Prior to ROP's creation, no internal security force existed in Oman. Security was the responsibility of the local walis or governors who carried it out with the help of local "Askars". The police presence was limited to the township of Muscat and Mutrah, where most of the souqs were present and most of the trade took place.

Once in power, Sultan Qaboos bin Said al Said, in addition to his other reform campaigns, went about building an efficient and modern police force in Oman. In 1974, Sultan Qaboos bin Said al Said conferred the title Royal Oman Police (ROP) on the newly formed force. In November that year, ROP received its colours from the Sultan. The next year, the ROP headquarters was inaugurated in Qurum.

The Royal Oman Police joined the International Criminal Police Organization (Interpol) in 1972, and the Arab Organization for Social Defense Against Crime in the same year.

The ROP played a highly criticised role in the 2011 Omani protests. On 28 February 2011, in Sohar, 250 kilometres north of Oman's capital Muscat, the ROP was reported to have opened fire using live bullets on protesters. The ROP had been using tear gas to quell protesters since the morning. However, the protesters became violent and started torching government buildings, including the Wali's office and the nearby police station. The police in its defense has stated that it had only used rubber bullets to throw back the protesters who were going to burn the police station while members of the ROP were still trapped inside. Two protesters were reported dead and it was believed that various police officers were injured too.

== Organisation ==
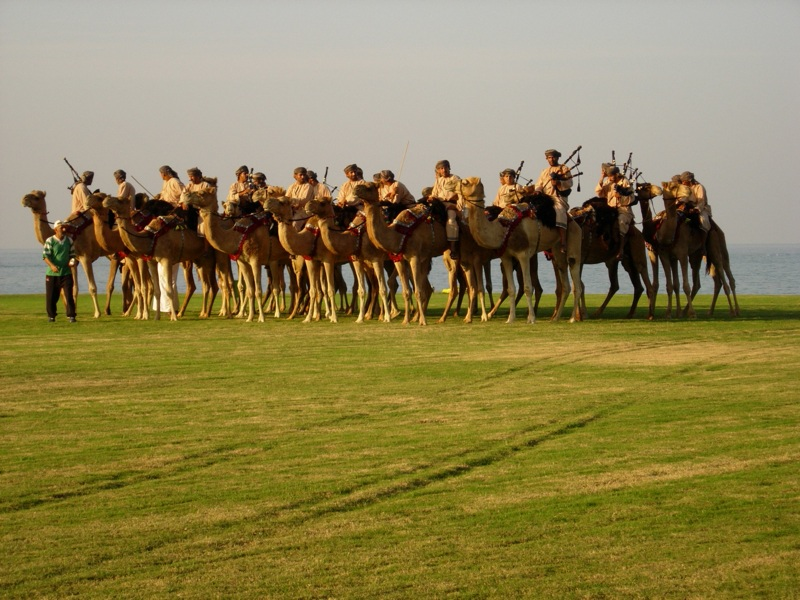
ROP Camel Band

The Royal Oman Police is a well organised police force. Sultan Haitham bin Tariq Al Said is the supreme commander of the ROP. Under him comes the Inspector General of Police and Customs. The title of the Commissioner for police which was used to be the title of the president of the force under the old Police Law No. 5/1973, a Royal Decree was issued on 26 November 1974 changing the title to the Inspector General of Police and Customs. The post is currently held by Lt Gen Hassan bin Mohsin Al Shraiqi who replaced Lt Gen Malek Bin Sulaiman Al Ma'amari as per royal decrees by the Sultan amidst the 2011 Oman protests.

ROP carries out the tasks of a coast guard as well and is empowered to carry out all custom related tasks. ROP also maintains a well trained dog section (created on 24 September 1976).

ROP maintains a fleet of support helicopters which perform a host of functions from fire-fighting to ambulance services to thermal imagery in anti-smuggling operations.

ROP also maintains horse and camel mounted troopers, who patrol terrains inaccessible to motor vehicles. The camel mounted officers are easy to be spotted on patrol near the Omani border, whereas horse-mounted officers are a common sight on Muscat's beaches.

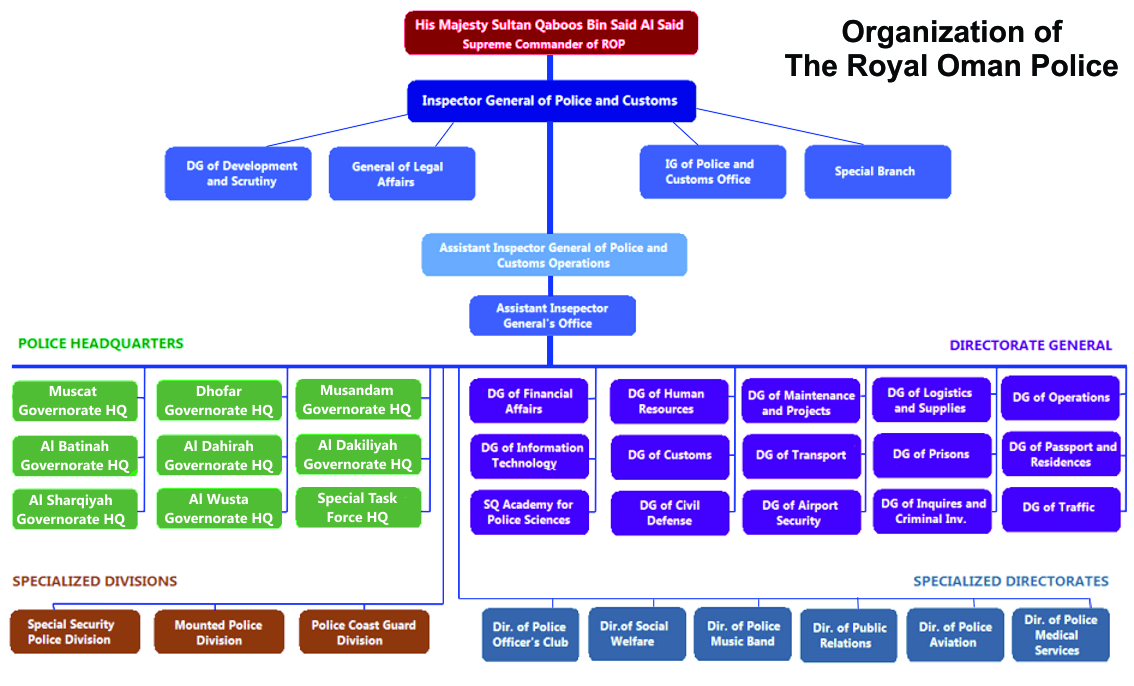
The Organization Chart for the Royal Oman Police

== Academy and training ==
Initially, Police training School at Qurum trained police cadres. On 9 November 1976, the first passing out ceremony of the School of Oman's first batch of Cadre Officers was conducted here under the patronage of the Sultan.

In 1980, the Sultan opened the Police Academy near Nizwa, recently renamed as the Sultan Qaboos Academy for Police Sciences. It provides basic training for police personnel, as well as diploma courses in police sciences for university graduates or those with equivalent qualifications. It also trains candidates for senior positions in the ROP.

The Police College, which is within the SQAPS complex, was established in 2000 and trains ROP officers and awards diplomas and degrees in law and police sciences.

The Traffic Safety Institute was set up to train both traffic police personnel and road users.

== Specialized forces ==
In addition to regular police duties, the Royal Oman Police is also charged with specialized missions.

=== Royal Oman Police Coast Guard ===
In co-operation with the Royal Navy of Oman, the Coast Guard division looks after Oman's territorial waters and conducts rescues of people in distress at sea.

Headquartered in Muscat, the Omani Coast Guard is led by Brigadier General Bader Khalfan Al Zadgali.

Regarding smuggling and piracy issues in the region the Royal Oman Police Coast Guard established relations and partnerships with actors in the region. Combined Task Forces 150 and 151 regularly reach Muscat for talks and cooperation through senior visits such as those by Commodore Daryl Bate in Muscat ROP HQ in 2014 and by Rear Admiral Ayhan Bay in 2015. The EU's Operation Atalanta is also a major partner as illustrated by Bader Khalfan Al Zadgali's 2017 meeting with Rear Admiral Gregori then commander of the EU mission. While GCC and western forces are key players in the area, and in accordance with wider Oman policy the Royal Oman Police maintain talks on smuggling with Iran. A dedicated summit with Brigadier Galal Stara, Commander of the Coast Guard Forces in the Islamic Republic of Iran, was held in March 2017.

A Sea Rescue Group has been established to help to prevent drowning accidents, respond to SOS calls, improve the monitoring of Oman's coastline and prevent illegal immigration and smuggling.

A command headquarters called The Oil and Gas Installations Command has been set up under the ROP to protect Oman's valuable oil and gas installations.

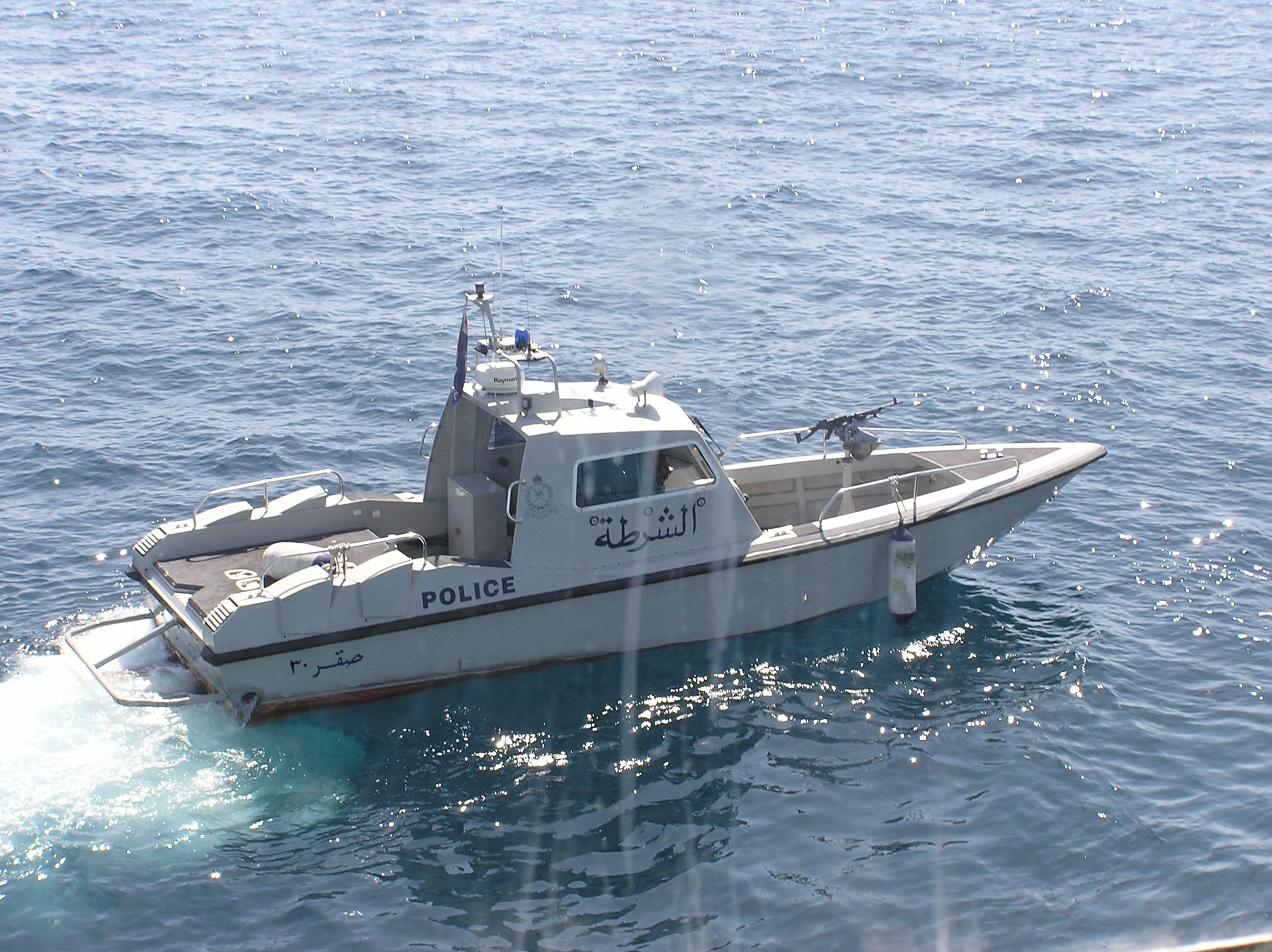
A patrol craft of the ROP

==== Fleet ====
The Police Coastguard Command has been equipped with new fast patrol boats, while the older boats currently in use have been modernized and fitted with new engines. An engineering and maintenance workshop makes sure the patrol craft are always serviceable.

The Royal Omani Police has engaged in major procurement programs since the mid 2010 mostly from Spanish, British and French suppliers.

Type	Length (m)	Speed (kt)	Number	Year	Shipyard	Country of origin	Name
Patrol boat	29	25	3	1981-1982	Karlskronavarvet	Sweden	Haras 7-10
Patrol boat	13	22	3	1981	Watercraft	UK	Zahra 14-17
Patrol boat	16	22	2	1981	Ensworth SB	UK	Zahra 18-21
Patrol boat	23	36	1	1988	Yokohama Yacht	Japan	Haras 12
Rodman 58	18	34		2003	Rodman Polyships	Spain	Haras 13-24
AMD520P	52	40	2	2008-2009	Rodriquez Cantieri Navali	Italy	Haras 1-2
27M MKV Patrol Boat	27,5	60	3	2009	US Marine Inc.	US	Haras 3-5
20m Diving and Rescue	20	36	1	2013	Lungteh Shipbuilding	Oman	Haras 29
Rodman 111	35.3	40	5	2015-2017	Rodman Polyships	Spain	Haras 10 (?)
Rodman 33	11.4	55	10	2017	Rodman Polyships	Spain	
Watercraft k13 FIC	14	55	14	2015-2017	Marine Alutech	Finland	
Ares 85 Hercules FPB	25.9	45	14	2018-2022	Ares Shipyard - BMT	Turkey	Sham 4-6
1400 FIC	14	50	22	2019-2022	Couach Plascoa	France	Najam 82-100
FPB 110	35		5	2021-2023	OCEA	France	Haras 10-12

=== Police Aviation Directorate ===
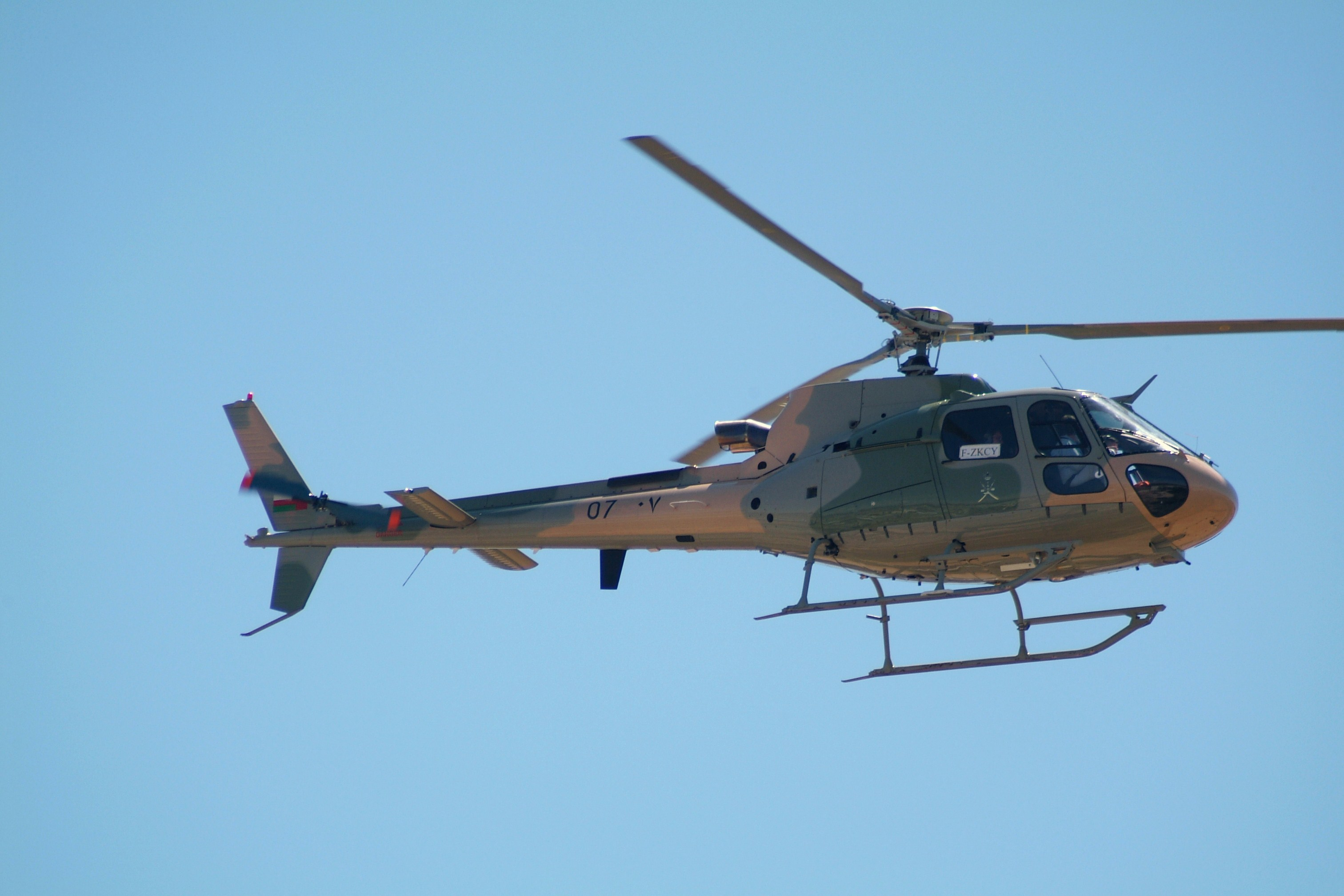
An ROP helicopter.

The Police Aviation Directorate uses the AgustaWestland AW139. It comprises a helicopter fire-fighting service for use in areas that are relatively inaccessible to ordinary fire engines as Oman has a vastly mountainous terrain. The Sultanate was one of the first countries in the region to set up this service and several pilots have now been trained to man it. The Police Aviation Directorate is to use its helicopter fleet for use in the Flying Ambulance service, for fire-fighting and rescue missions, or to provide monitoring and support services for the ROP's other departments using thermal imaging systems.

== Women in the ROP ==
Oman claims striving to provide equal status to its female population. There are some women in the ROP who serve in logistical, support wings as well as in the Traffic police. The ROP also has an all female music band. Female cadres undergo as strict or training as their male counterparts, yet Omani women have come out in numbers to join the police force.

== Additional functions ==
The ROP provides a range of services.

=== Civil affairs ===
The Directorate-General of Civil Status registers the births, marriages, divorces and deaths of Omani nationals, as well as the births and deaths of expatriate residents in the Sultanate, in addition to their marriages and divorces if one of the parties to the marriage or divorce is an Omani. Omani nationals are also issued with smart multipurpose ID cards, which are both flexible and secure and – among other things – show the holder's driving licence details. Such smart cards have become a norm in almost all Arab nations.

Residence cards are also issued to resident expatriates working in the Sultanate, and their dependants. The labour card and the residence card have now been combined into one card.

=== Customs ===
Port Sultan Qaboos, Muscat International Airport and all overland crossing points now use an improved Customs computer system. This has been put in place to improve customs clearance procedures and customs clearance offices. These moves are designed to support the national economy and come in response to the Gulf Co-operation Council Customs Union and the Greater Arab Free Trade Zone.

Using its new container and motor vehicle inspection equipment, the Directorate General of Customs is now better equipped to detect and identify prohibited substances and smuggled goods. A declaration on a container security and goods inspection initiative has also been signed between the Directorate-General of Customs and its American counterpart, allowing for the inspection of goods transported by sea between Omani and American ports. This shall prove to be of significant help especially now that Oman and USA have a free trade agreement in place.

=== Road safety and traffic police ===
On 4 September 1970, the police department took over the responsibility of motor vehicles licensing which used to be under the responsibility of the Muscat and Muttrah Municipality. Ever since, the ROP has worked to put in place an efficient traffic policing system.

Oman has continuously recorded a huge leap in road accidents and accident related deaths. Oman's road traffic death rate is 28 per 100,000 population which is far higher than the global average of 19 killed per 100,000. Due to this the ROP has taken a tough stance against negligent drivers. Vehicles are regularly inspected, training standards for drivers have been raised and traffic rules are rigorously enforced, particularly with regard to speed limits. Intensive awareness campaigns are regularly held for drivers and other sections of society, including school students. To this end, the police work closely with other departments and organisations, particularly the Ministry of Education and the media. By the end of 2005, fixed and mobile radar speed detectors had been installed in all the governorates and regions in a further attempt to help reduce traffic accidents.

The Omani government and the ROP have continuously made road safety their top priority. They have also worked effectively to promote road safety internationally. Oman submitted a draft resolution to the UN General Assembly entitled Road safety must not be left to chance, to help promote international co-operation on the prevention of traffic accidents, which was adopted by the UN in 2004 (Titled – A/58/289).

In March 2006, the ROP won first prize in an international contest, in which 36 countries participated and organised. The competition was organized by the United Nations, at the 1st Global Road Safety Film Festival in Geneva, for a film entitled "Pain and Hope", a documentary highlighting the suffering of families who lose relatives in road accidents. The film is currently stored in the UN library.

=== Ambulance services ===
The ROP provides a Highway Emergency Ambulance Service for victims of road and other accidents. The Ambulance Unit, which has a fleet of modern ambulances with modern hightech medical equipment, covers the Governorate of Muscat up to Batinah Region, as well as the main road from the wilayat of Barka to Khatmat Malahah on the UAE border. The service is proposed to be expanded to cover the entire country.

The Ambulance Service uses an advanced telecommunications system directed through the ROP's telecommunications centre. The system co-ordinates the movement of ambulances to ensure that they reach the scene of an accident in the shortest possible time.

=== Civil defense services ===
With regard to the protection of buildings, installations and property, the Directorate-General of Civil Defence has been supplied with civil defence and fire-fighting equipment.

== See also ==
- Royal Oman Police Stadium
- Internal Security Service
- Sultan of Oman's Armed Forces
