= SAHRA Mechanical Respirator =

SAHRA is a modular mechanical breathing device (Ventilator) produced by the Mechanical and Chemical Industry Corporation with local and national facilities. It provides basic respiratory support for patients experiencing shortness of breath and a decrease in the oxygen rate in the blood. In Turkey, the respirator needs that may arise due to the pandemic has been developed to meet with local and national facilities. Research and development studies of the device started in March 2020 and the first prototype was produced in April of the same year. In addition, the device, whose portable model was developed, has been certified by the relevant ISO as of May 2020. SAHRA has a production capacity of 500 pieces per week by MKE Institution. military and civil health units and their intensive care units, field hospitals and ambulances.
