= Ares 80 SAT =

History

Qatar
- Name: Ares 80 SAT
- Status: Active

Class overview
- Builders: Ares Shipyard
- Operators: Royal Qatar Coast Guard
- Planned: 6

General characteristics
- Type: Rigid boat
- Length: 24.10 m (79.1 ft)
- Beam: 5.50 m (18.0 ft)
- Draft: 1.20 m (3 ft 11 in)
- Propulsion: 2 x Diesel engines & waterjets
- Speed: 45 kn (83 km/h; 52 mph)
- Complement: Rigid-hull inflatable boat (RHIB)
- Sensors & processing systems: Electro-optical sensors, sea-based X-band Radar
- Armament: Remotely controlled 12.7 mm machine gun

Ares 80 SAT is a Special operations support and fast attack craft made in Turkey. Qatar ordered six boats for its Coast Guard Command.

== Similar vessels ==
Following vessels are similar to Ares 80 SAT:

- Ares 55 SAT
- Ares 100 SAT
- Ares 115 SAT
- Ares 150 SAT
