= MKEK-1 =

MKEK-1 Gözcü

General information
- Type: Observation aircraft
- National origin: Turkey
- Manufacturer: MKEK
- Status: Abandoned project

The MKEK-1 Gözcü (Turkish - "Observer") was a projected aircraft that was to have provided the Turkish Army with a domestically designed and produced airborne observation post for artillery spotting and general liaison duties. It was the first aircraft design undertaken by MKEK following its acquisition of THK's manufacturing facilities in 1952.

However, the wide availability of the Piper Cub and Super Cub led to the Army's selection of that aircraft instead, and work on the MKEK-1 was abandoned.
