= MKEK-6 =

General information
- Type: two-seat training glider
- National origin: Turkey
- Manufacturer: Mechanical and Chemical Industry Corporation
- Number built: 1

The MKEK-6 was a two-seat training glider designed and built in Turkey by Mechanical and Chemical Industry Corporation (Makina Kimya endustrisi Kurumu) (MKEK), during the early 1950s.

== Design and development ==
The MKEK-6 was a high-wing, two-seat, training glider with a wooden monocoque, circular cross-section fuselage. The wooden-construction wing was a single-spar structure with constant taper in chord and thickness. The tail unit was conventional and the undercarriage consisted of a skid under the fuselage nose, a main-wheel aft of the skid and a tail-skid at the extreme aft end of the fuselage. The enclosed cockpit sat two occupants in side-by-side configuration, with dual controls.

== Specifications (MKEK-6) ==
Data from Jane's All the World's Aircraft 1958-59.

General characteristics

- Crew: one
- Capacity: one passenger
- Length: 7.9 m (25 ft 11 in)
- Wingspan: 16 m (52 ft 6 in)
- Wing area: 22.83 m^{2} (245.7 sq ft)
- Aspect ratio: 11.2
- Empty weight: 260 kg (573 lb)
- Gross weight: 420 kg (926 lb)

Performance

- Maximum speed: 181 km/h (112 mph, 98 kn) maximum in smooth air
- Stall speed: 53.5 km/h (33.2 mph, 28.9 kn)
- Never exceed speed: 502 km/h (312 mph, 271 kn)
- Wing loading: 18.4 kg/m^{2} (3.8 lb/sq ft)
