= THK-16 =

Unproduced Turkish aircraft

THK-16 Mehmetçik

General information
- Type: Military trainer
- National origin: Turkey
- Manufacturer: THK/MKEK
- Status: Abandoned project

The THK-16 Mehmetçik (Turkish: "Little Mehmet") was an aircraft designed in Turkey in the early 1950s to provide the Turkish Air Force with a domestically designed and built jet trainer. The project was cancelled without the aircraft having been built.

As designed, the THK-16 was to have been a conventional, mid-wing monoplane with the pilot and instructor seated in tandem under a long canopy. Power would have been provided by two small turbojets mounted in underwing nacelles, and construction was to have been metal throughout. Design work was practically complete in 1952 when Türk Hava Kurumu was bought out by MKEK. Although the THK-16 was selected as one of the THK designs that MKEK felt was worth continuing with and allocated the designation MKEK-3, the Turkish Air Force purchased the Lockheed T-33 Shooting Star as its jet trainer and work on the local design was abandoned.

== Specifications (as designed) ==
Data from Cebeci 2004

General characteristics

- Crew: 2
- Length: 7.00 m (23 ft 0 in)
- Wingspan: 10.00 m (32 ft 10 in)
- Height: 1.80 m (5 ft 11 in)
- Wing area: 14.0 m^{2} (151 sq ft)
- Empty weight: 510 kg (1,124 lb)
- Gross weight: 1,100 kg (2,425 lb)
- Powerplant: 2 × Turbomeca Piméné , 0.7 kN (160 lbf) thrust each

Performance

- Maximum speed: 430 km/h (270 mph, 230 kn)
- Range: 710 km (440 mi, 380 nmi)
- Service ceiling: 12,000 m (39,000 ft)
