= Mechanical and Chemical Industry Corporation =

Turkish government owned defense company

- Type: Incorporation (business)
- Industry: Defence
- Founded: 15 March 1950
- Founder: Turkish Government
- Headquarters: Ankara, Turkey
- Area served: Armed forces
- Products: Assault rifles Ammunition; Artillery systems Aerial bombs Land mines Explosives; Rockets
- Revenue: ▲US$1.14 billion (2024)
- Operating income: ▲US$132 million (2024)
- Net income: ▼US$52 million (2024)
- Total assets: ▲US$1.8 billion (2024)
- Total equity: ▲US$857 million (2024)
- Owner: Ministry of National Defense (Turkey): 100%
- Number of employees: 3.982 (2024)
- Subsidiaries: Zafer
- Website: www.mke.gov.tr

The Mechanical and Chemical Industry Corporation (Turkish: Makine ve Kimya Endüstrisi or MKE for short), established in 1950, is a reorganization of government-controlled group of factories in Turkey that supplied the Turkish Armed Forces with military products.

== History ==
Its roots lie in the "Tophane-i Amire" ("Royal Arsenal") built in the latter part of the 15th Century to supply the Ottoman Empire's artillery corps with cannon, powder, and shot. This was reorganized in 1832 as the "Tophane Müşavirliği" ("Arsenal of Ordnance and Artillery Marshalship") and was later formed in a department of "Harbiye Nezareti" (Ministry of War) in 1908. After World War I and the following Turkish War of Independence, it was reorganized as the "General Directorate of Military Factories" in 1923. Today, the MKE is made up of 12 facilities that employ 7,430 personnel. The first produced rifle was Mauser Model M1938 (along with 'Enfauser' Lee–Enfield/Mauser hybrids) and the first pistol was Walther PP, both known as 'Kırıkkale'.

== Legal status ==
The company's legal status has changed from state-owned enterprise to a corporation, with the Law Nr. 7330 dated July 3, 2021.

== Products ==
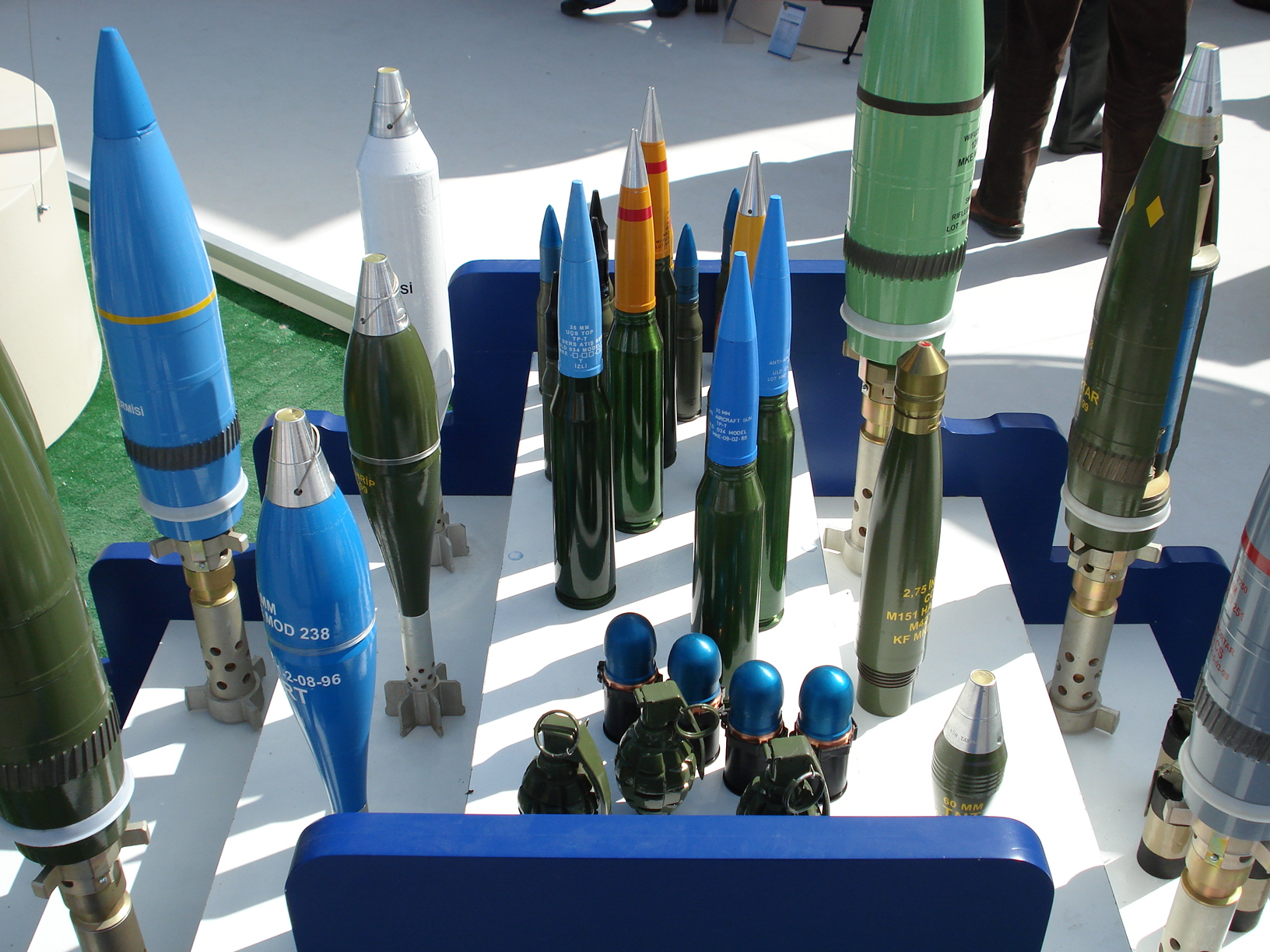
MKEK munitions on IDEF 2007

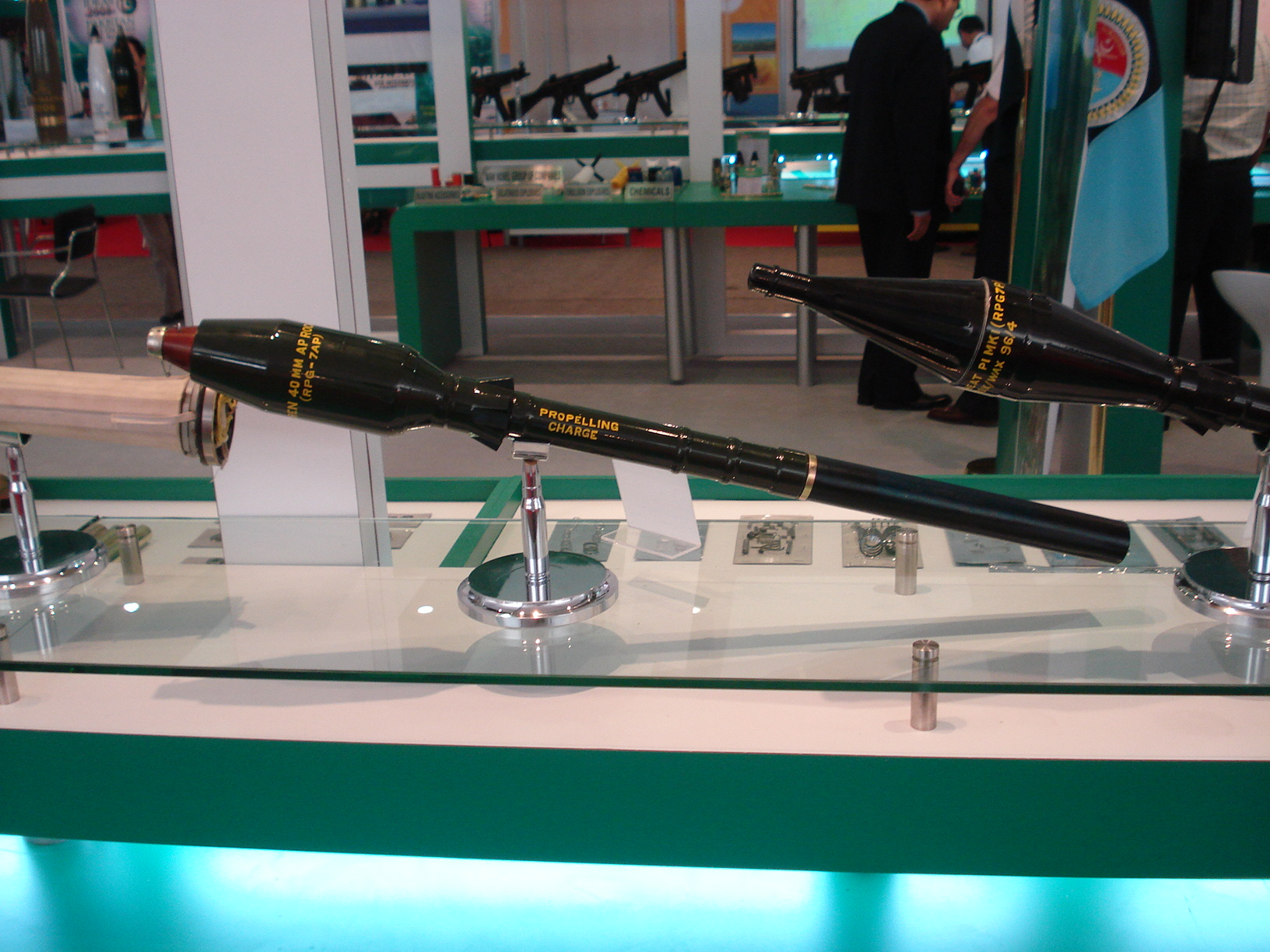
40mm RPG by MKEK

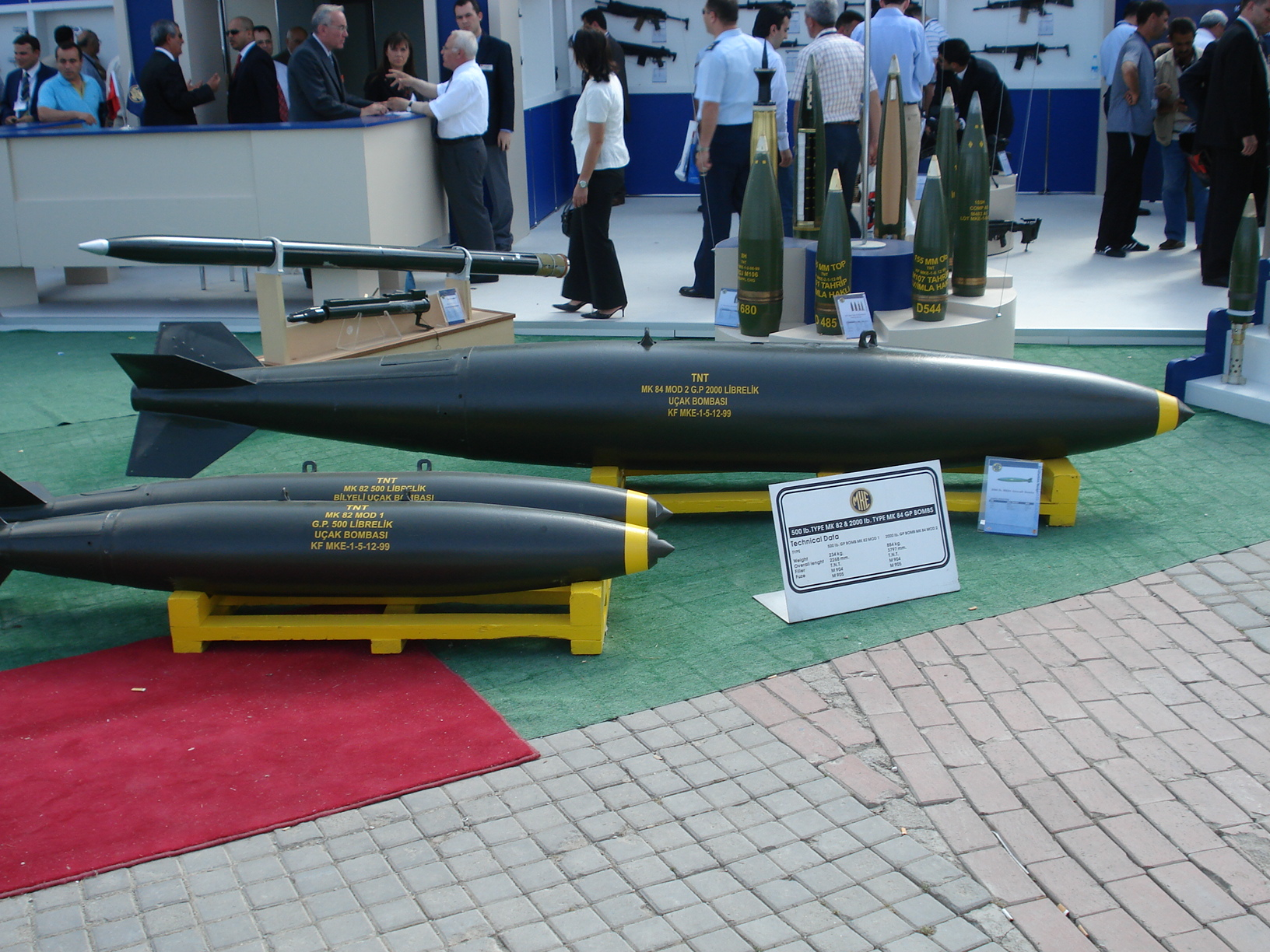
MK-84 and MK-82 by MKEK

The corporation mainly produces equipment for the Turkish Armed Forces, such as the ammunition for small arms and heavy weapons, artillery systems, aerial bombs, mines, explosives, and rockets. MKEK also manufactures civil-purpose products such as steel, brass, and electrical parts and equipment. Its large range of defense industry products are not only demanded in Turkey, but are exported to more than 40 countries worldwide.

In 2011, the company has sold military products to 29 countries worldwide. MKE decided to increase its production capacity by investing $818 million in Ankara and Kırıkkale in 2025. The first smoothbore gun for Altay main battle tank was introduced in 2011.

- Production groups:
  - Ammunition Group
  - Rocket Group
  - Weapons Group
  - Explosives, Propellants, and Pyrotechnic Products Group
- Company and factories: there are 11 factories and 1 company affiliated with MKE located in three major manufacturing hubs:
  - Kırıkkale
    - Ammunition Factory
    - Brass Factory
    - Heavy Weapons Factory And Steel Foundry
    - Explosives Factory
    - Small-Arms Weapons Factory (Kırıkkale Arsenal Co.)
  - Ankara
    - Explosive & Propellant Factory
    - Machinery and Gas-Mask Factory MAKSAM
    - Pyrotechnics Factory
    - Scrap Recycling Plant
    - Small-Arms Ammunition Factory
  - Çankırı
    - Medium-Caliber Weapons Factory
  - İzmit
    - Scrap Recycling Plant

== MKE Maksam Machine and Mask Factory ==
MKE Maksam (Turkish: Maksam Makine Ve Maske Fabrikası Müdürlüğü or MAKSAM for short) was founded in 1920. The company's line of business includes the manufacturing of surgical appliances and supplies also CBRN masks and products, various masks are produced for the army and civilians. During COVID-19 pandemic Maksam produced millions of Surgical Mask, FFP3 Type Mask, Protective Coverall, Goggles Type A-B, Face Protection Visor Type C, Protective Gloves, Panoramic Mask Set, P13 Plastic Strainer and MKE Surgical Mask Production Machines.

=== SAHRA Mechanical Respirator ===
Apart from masks and protective equipment, SAHRA Mechanical Respirator was produced by making use of local and national facilities in order to provide basic respiratory support to COVID-19 patients. SAHRA is ready for mass production by the end of May 2020 and has a weekly production capacity of 500 pieces.

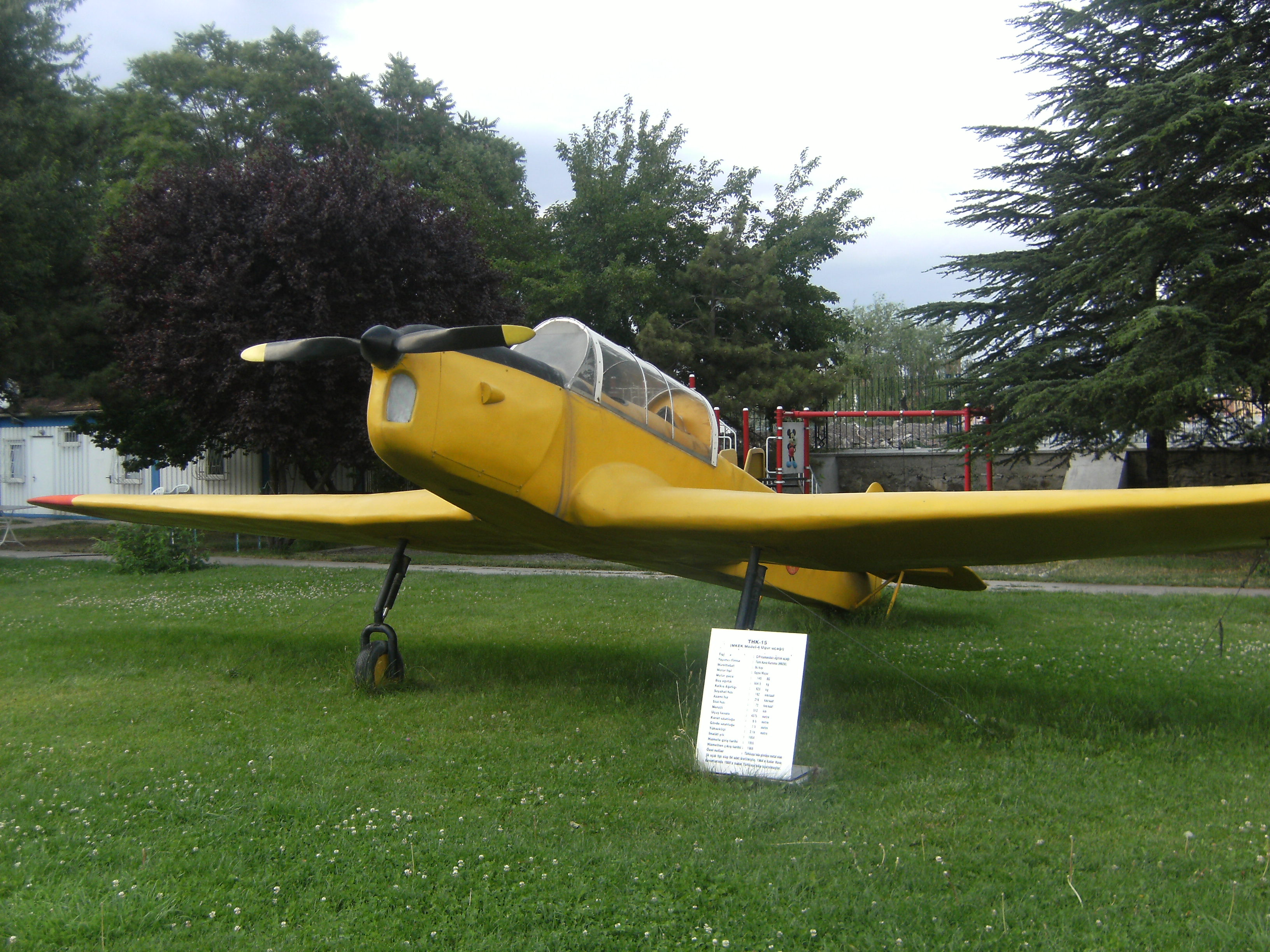
Mkek THK 15 plane.

== Aircraft ==
- MKEK-1 Gözcü (Turkish - "Observer")
- MKEK-2 6 planes were produced
- MKEK-3
- MKEK-4 Uğur (Turkish: "Luck") 57 planes were produced, three of which were donated to the Royal Jordanian Air Force.
- MKEK-5 Twin-engine aircraft developed by in Turkey in 1945 as an air ambulance.
- MKEK-6
- MKEK-7
- THK-16

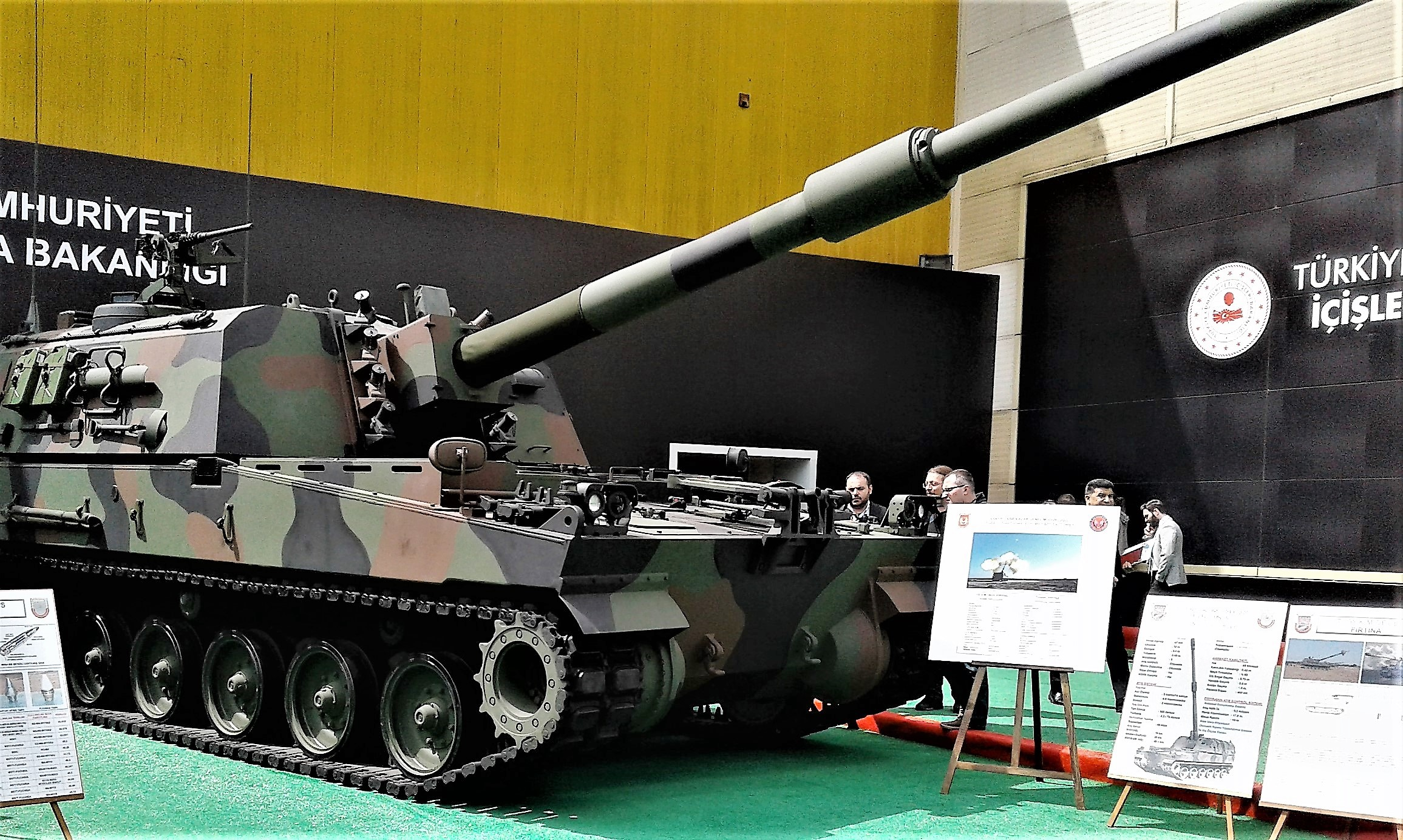
MKEK 155 mm tracked self-propelled howitzer T-155 Fırtına

== Vehicles ==
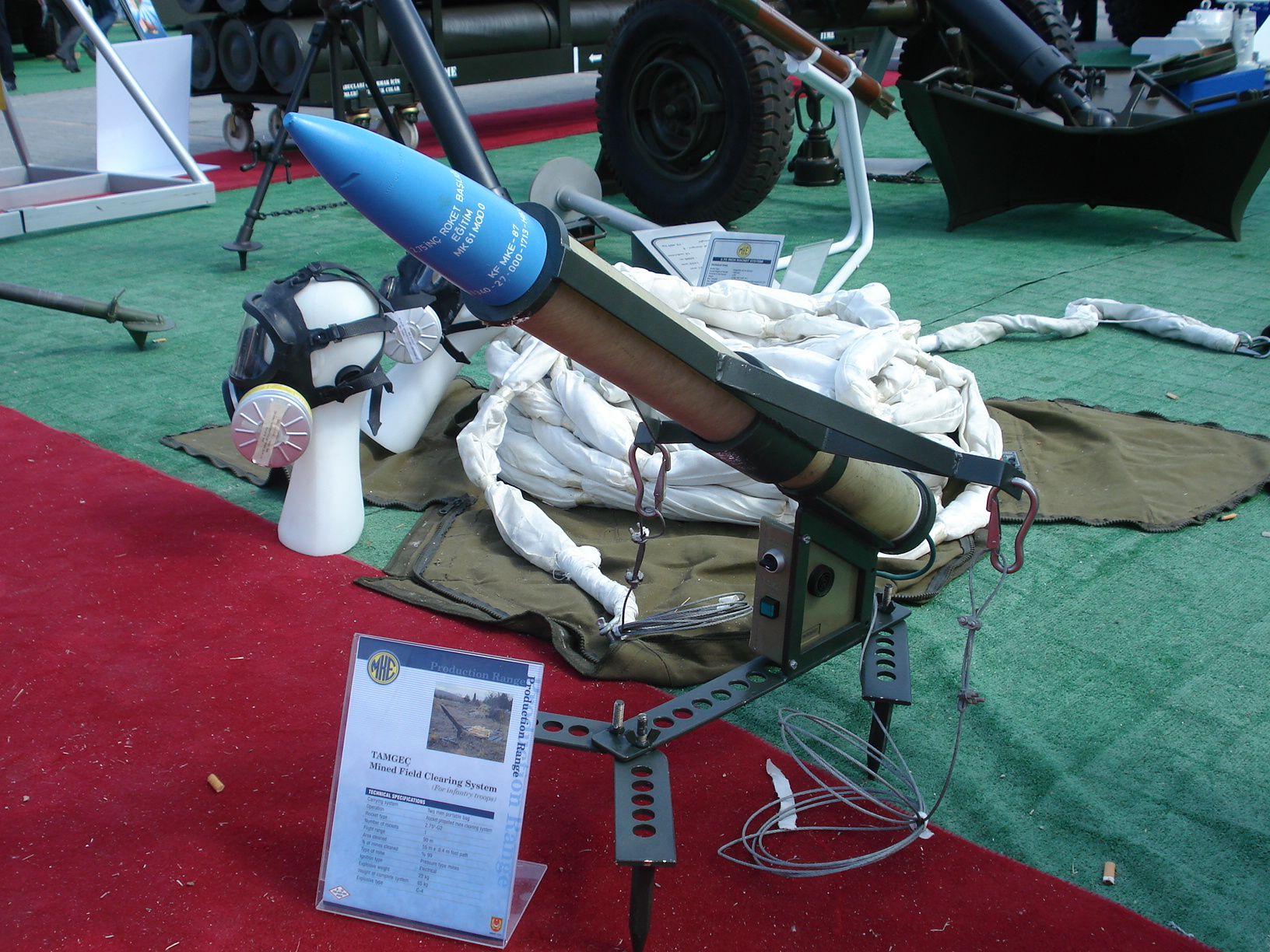
MKE TAMGEÇ mine-clearing line charge system.

- T-155 Fırtına 155 mm 52 caliber tracked self-propelled howitzer
- T-155 Yavuz 155 mm 52 caliber wheeled self-propelled howitzer
- Pirana USV, single-use unmanned surface vehicle (USV) used as a loitering munition

=== Engineering and Ammunition Resupply Vehicles ===
- MKEK POYRAZ - Ammunition resupply vehicle
- MKE TAMGEÇ Mine-clearing line charge system.
- MKE TAMKAR Mine-clearing line charge system

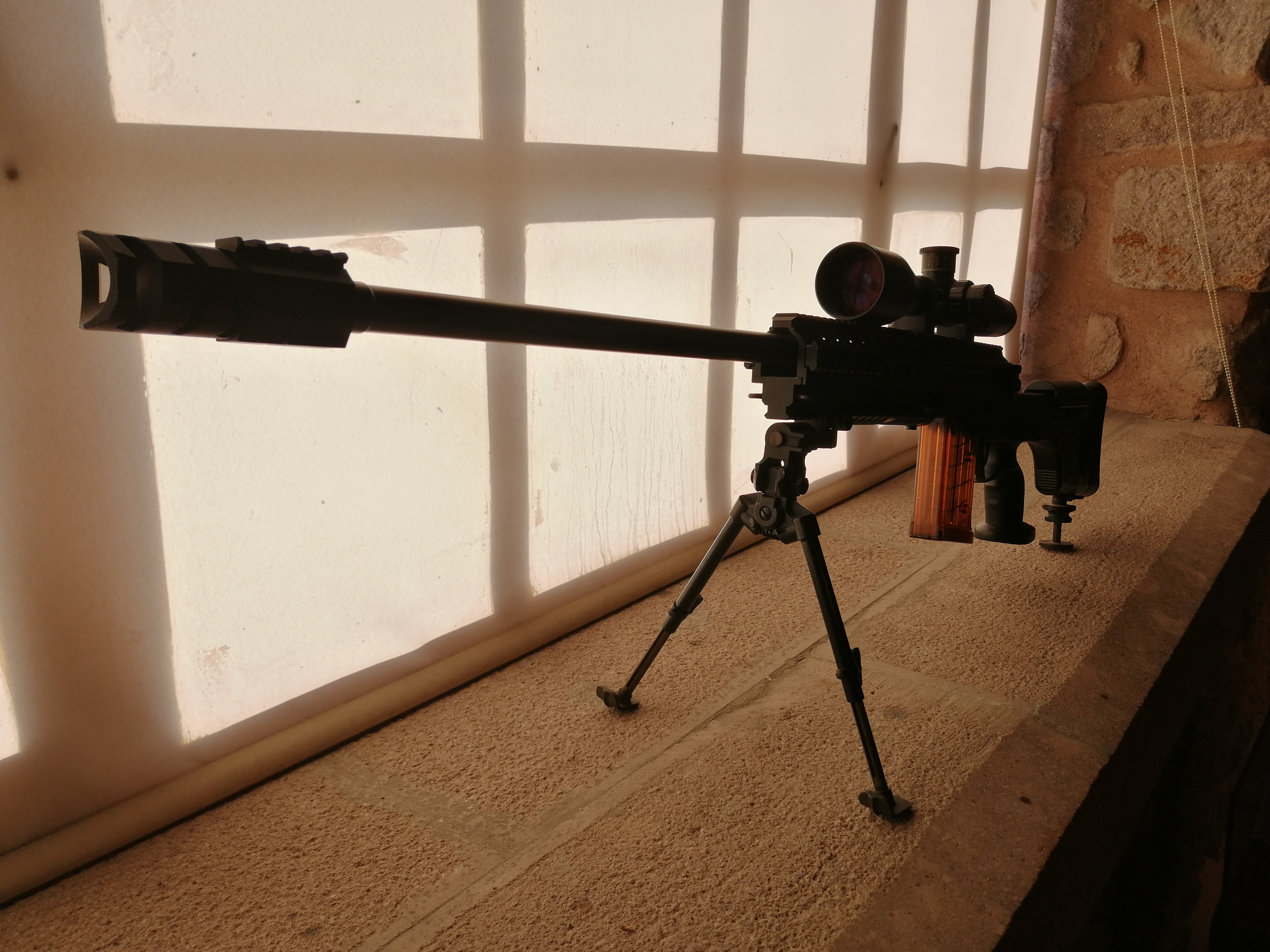
Bora-12 (MKEK JNG-90)

== Weapons ==
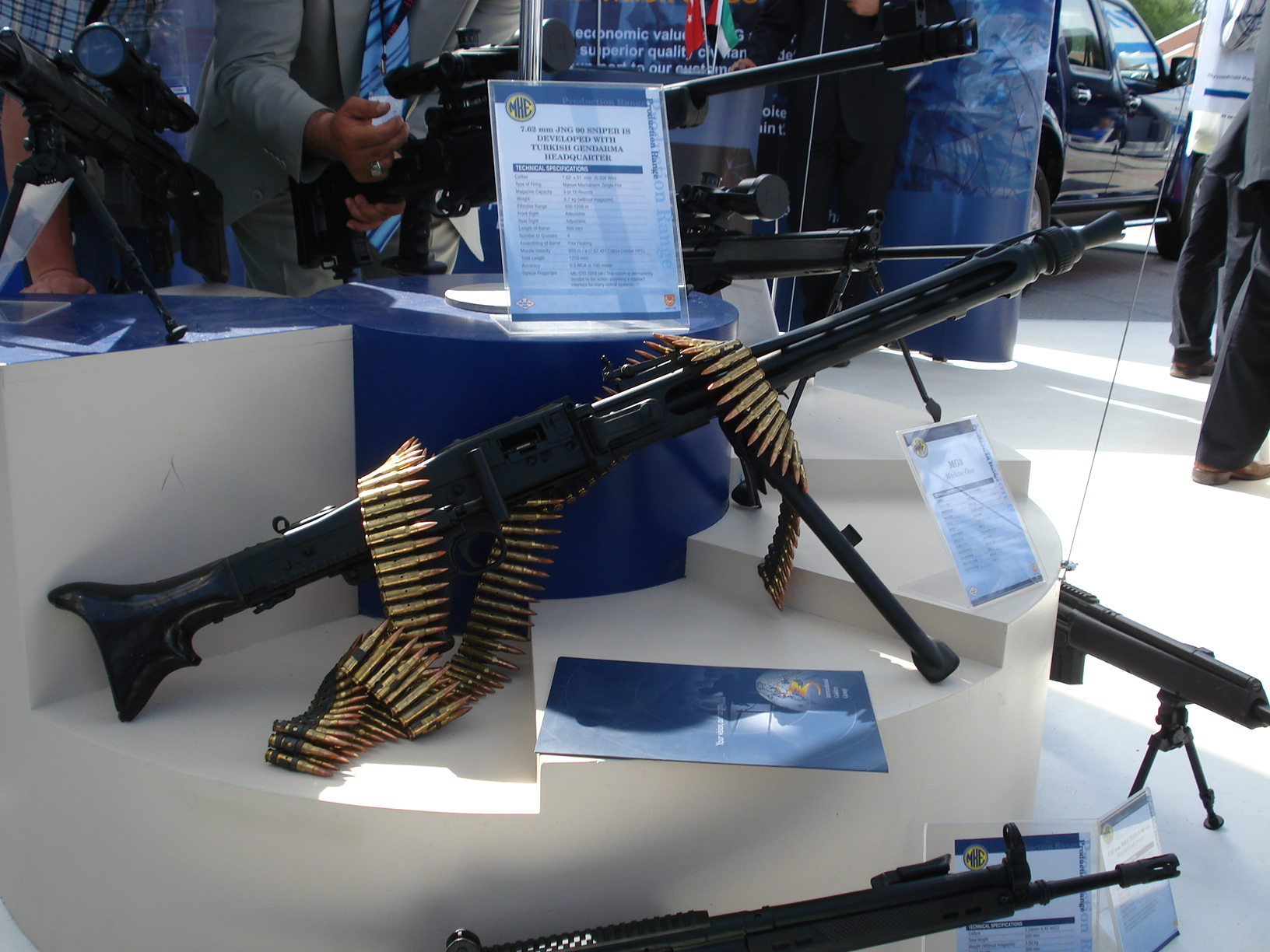
Rheinmetall MG 3 made by MKEK in Kırıkkale under license since 1974 for the Turkish Armed Forces and Turkish Gendarmerie.

=== Small arms ===
- CS tear gas grenade
- G3-A3/A4/A7 (T41/T43)(licensed production)
- HK33-A2/A3 (T-50) (licensed production)
- JMK Bora 12/JNG-90 bolt action sniper rifle
- KAAN-717 carbine
- KNT-76 designated marksman rifle
- MAM-15 anti-materiel sniper rifle
- KN-12 sniper rifle
- MGL (licensed production)
- MG3 (licensed production)
- Mk 2 anti-personnel hand grenade (licensed production)
- Mk 3 concussion grenade (licensed production)
- Mk 19 automatic grenade launcher (licensed production)
- MMT modern machine gun
- MOD 56 riot control hand grenade
- MOT-919 submachine gun
- MPT-76/76MH/55/55K/68
- TLS-571 carbine
- MP5-A2/A3/K/MTS (AP5/T94) (licensed production)
- PMT-76/PMT-76-57A machine gun
- T40-R/R5 under-barrel grenade launcher (also for IWI Tavor X95s)
- T-41/43/50/94 are semi auto for us market
- MT12QCB

=== Artillery/Rockets/Missiles ===
- MKE Boran 105 mm howitzer (based on L118)
- MKE Attila is a high mobility truck-mounted 155/52 mm howitzer.
- Eryx anti-tank guided missile (licensed production)
- HY1-12 120 mm mortar
- MKE FFAR 70 mm air to ground and surface to surface unguided rocket (licensed production)
- MK 82 general-purpose bomb (licensed production)
- MK 84 general-purpose bomb (licensed production)
- MKE 76 mm/62-caliber National Naval Gun
- MKE 120 mm 55 caliber smoothbore gun (based on CN08)
- MO-120 RT-61 120 mm heavy mortar (licensed production)
- NT1 81 mm mortar
- Oerlikon 20 mm anti-aircraft gun for double barrel GAI 001 system (licensed production)
- Oerlikon 35 mm double barrel anti-aircraft gun for towed MKE GDF-003B and other systems (licensed production)
- Panter 155 mm 52 caliber towed howitzer
- Penetrator bomb - 870 Kg 2.1 m thick used on Turkish Air Force F-4 Terminator 2020s and F-16 Falcons
- UT1 81 mm mortar
- 60 mm commando mortar
- 66 mm light anti-tank system
- 105 mm M68 Tank Gun Weapon System
- 107 mm MBRL
- ENFAL-17, Low Attitude Air Defence Missile System
- MKE TOLGA, Short-Range Air Defence System

=== Protective gear ===
- MAKSAM Panoramic Gas Mask
- NEFES CBRN Gas Mask
- SR6 and SR6M NBC Respirator (licensed production)
- SR10 and SR10 ST Gas Masks

== Museums of the MKE ==
- MKE Industry and Technology Museum (Ankara)
- Kırıkkale MKE Weapons Industry Museum (Kırıkkale)

== Sports clubs associated with the MKE ==
- MKE Ankaragücü
- MKE Kırıkkalespor
- MKE Çankırıspor
- MKE Gazi Fişek Spor
- MKE Maske Spor
