= Law enforcement in Northern Cyprus =

Law enforcement in Northern Cyprus is administered by the Republic's Security Council and the Ministry of the Interior, to whom the Turkish Republic of Northern Cyprus's police force, the Directorate General for Police, reports. The commander of the police service of this de facto independent republic sits on the Republic's Security Council along with representatives from the Ministry of Interior, Foreign Affairs and Defence, the armed forces and the President.

The police force is regulated under Section 118 of the Constitution:

The establishment, duties, powers and responsibilities of the Police Organization shall be regulated by law. The police are charged with performing their duties within the framework of the Constitution and laws with due respect to the principles of a democratic State under the rule of law and to the fundamental rights of citizens.

The emergency number for the police force in the Turkish Republic of Northern Cyprus is 155.
