= TCB Marlin USCV =

Turkish unmanned combat surface vessel

Class overview
- Name: Marlin SİDA
- Builders: Sefine Shipyard
- Operators: Turkish Navy

History

Turkish NavyTurkey
- Name: TCB Marlin USCV
- Commissioned: 19 January 2024

General characteristics Marlin SİDA
- Type: Unmanned surface vehicle
- Displacement: 21 long tons (21 t)
- Length: 15 m (49 ft)
- Beam: 3.85 m (12.6 ft)
- Speed: 35 kn (65 km/h; 40 mph)
- Range: 1,000 nmi (1,900 km; 1,200 mi)
- Electronic warfare & decoys: Electronic warfare support system; Sonobuoy
- Armament: 12.7 mm Remote controlled weapon station; Long range guided missiles; Light torpedo

TCB Marlin USCV (TCB-1101) (Turkish: Marlin Silahlı İnsansız Deniz Aracı, Marlin SİDA) is an unmanned combat surface vessel (UCSV) of the Turkish Naval Forces, commissioned in January 2024.

== History ==
The UCSV was designed by the Defence Industry Agency of the Ministry of Defense, and built in the Sefine Shipyard at Altınova, Yalova Province in cooperation with the state-owned defence systems company Aselsan for the Turkish Naval Forces.

Marlin USCV took part at the "NATO Dynamic Messenger 2022" Exercise held at Tróia Peninsula, Portugal, and displayed her electronic warfare abilities.

On 6 January 2023, a solid-propellant rocket-powered missile Kuzgun-KY, developed by TÜBİTAK-SAGE, was test fired from the UCSV.

At a ceremony held on 9 January 2024, she entered service in the Turkish Naval Forces as the first unmanned surface vessel with the hull number TCB-1101 and name Marlin.

== Characteristics ==
The vessel features autonomous navigation capability and high maneuverability. She is 15 m (49 ft) long, has a beam of 3.85 m (12.6 ft), a displacement tonnage of 21 long tons (21 t) and payload capacity of 4 long tons (4.1 t). She can cruise at a speed up to 35 kn (65 km/h; 40 mph) within a range of 1,000 nmi (1,900 km; 1,200 mi) with an endurance of 72 hours. The vessel is powered by two Diesel engines. She features dynamic positioning system KARETTA, anti-jam system GNSS and active stabilization system. She is armed with a 12.7 mm remote controlled weapon station, long range guided missiles, light torpedo, and is equipped with Electronic warfare support system, Armelsan Dipping Sonar - Orkun 2053, Armelsan Diver Detection Sonar - Aras 2023 and Sonobuoy.

== Variants ==
Two specialized variants of the Marlin USV have been developed: the Marlin 100 ASW for anti-submarine warfare (ASW) missions and the Marlin 100 EW for electronic warfare (EW) missions. Both are based on the same modular 15-metre platform and feature autonomous navigation capabilities, multiple communication links, speeds exceeding 35 knots, and an endurance of up to 72 hours. The variants differ primarily in their mission payloads, with the ASW variant designed to accommodate sonar systems and related ASW equipment, while the EW variant integrates electronic support and electronic attack systems.
