= Sancar SİDA =

Turkish unmanned combat surface vessel

Class overview
- Name: Sancar SİDA
- Builders: Yonca-Onuk Shipyard
- Operators: Turkish Navy
- Built: 2022

General characteristics Sancar SİDA
- Type: Unmanned surface vehicle
- Displacement: 40 long tons (41 t) full load
- Length: 12.7 m (42 ft)
- Propulsion: 2x Diesel engines, 2x Pump-jets
- Speed: 40 kn (74 km/h; 46 mph)
- Range: 400 nmi (740 km; 460 mi) at 10 kn (19 km/h; 12 mph)
- Armament: 12.7 mm Aselsan STAMP-2; 2x2 UMTAS / L-UMTAS

Sancar SİDA is a Turkish unmanned combat surface vessel (UCSV) of the Turkish Navy.

== History ==
The UCSV (Turkish: Silahlı İnsansız Deniz Aracı, SİDA) was projected by the Defence Industry Agency, and built in the Yonca-Onuk Shipyard at Tuzla, Istanbul in cooperation with the state-owned defence systems company Havelsan for the needs of the Turkish Naval Forces. She was launched on 7 June 2022. Sancar SİDA was developed to perform unmanned reconnaissance and surveillance, surface warfare and mine countermeasure missions risky for human life.

== Characteristics ==
The vessel features COLREG compliant autonomous navigation. She is 12.7 m (42 ft) long, has a displacement tonnage of 40 long tons (41 t) and payload of 9 long tons (9.1 t). She can cruise at a speed up to 40 kn (74 km/h; 46 mph) within a range of 400 nmi (740 km; 460 mi) at 10 kn (19 km/h; 12 mph) with an endurance of 40 hours. She is powered by two Diesel engines and two pump-jets. She is able to operate at sea conditions up to Beaufort scale 4. She is armed with a 12.7 mm remote controlled weapon station Aselsan STAMP-2, long range guided missiles 2x2 UMTAS and laser guided L-UMTAS. She is equipped with side-scan sonar, and an up to 4 m (13 ft) extendable telescopic mast MILMAST for navigation radar, camera, anti-collision systems,

Sancar SİDA is the first platform to be deployed with the Phase 1 of the Naval Combat Management System ADVENT ROTA. The ADVENT KALYON Mission System is located at the control station.. It was announced on 19 November 2023 that she successfully completed the acceptance tests at sea. She is compliant NATO Interoperability Standards and Profiles.
