= Pirana USV =

Turkish single-use unmanned surface vehicle

Pirana (Turkish: PİRANA) is Turkish single-use unmanned surface vehicle (USV) manufactured by Mechanical and Chemical Industry Corporation (MKE; Makine ve Kimya Endüstrisi). It was introduced in 2025 and presented at defense exhibitions such as the International Defence Industry Fair. It is a maritime "kamikaze"-type loitering munition with the purpose to ram and destroy ships or coastal targets.

In June 2025, a capability was demonstrated to control Pirana via Bayraktar TB3 serving as an airborne relay, so that Pirana may be controlled beyond the horizon, extending its control range to over 40km. Beyond this range Pirana may operate autonomously. There are plans to extend the control range via the use of a satellite link.
