= Airbus Wingman =

Unmanned fighter aircraft in development by Airbus

Wingman
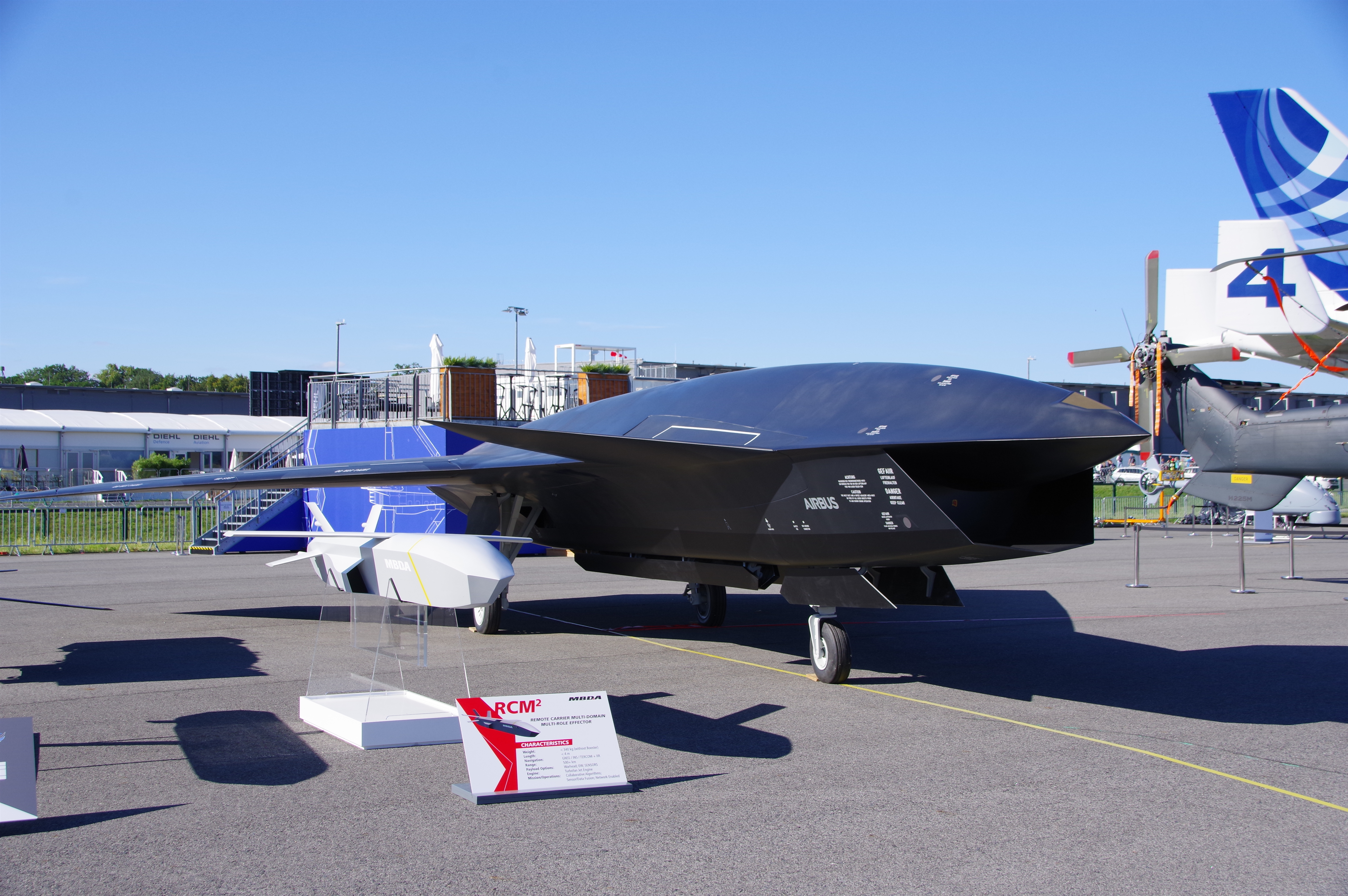
- Airbus Wingman concept showcased at the ILA Berlin 2024.

General information
- Type: Loyal wingman drone
- Manufacturer: Airbus
- Status: Development cancelled or postponed
- Primary users: German Air Force (proposed) Spanish Air and Space Force (proposed)

The Airbus Wingman was a unmanned combat aerial vehicle (UCAV) with loyal wingman capabilities proposed by European aerospace manufacturer Airbus. It would have accompanied a Eurofighter Typhoon or other combat aircraft as a force multiplier using its loyal wingman capabilities. As of November 2026, development on the Wingman had been paused.

== Development ==
A 1 to 1 scale "show car" version of the Wingman was unveiled on 3 June 2024 at the 2024 ILA Berlin Air Show. The Wingman is said to feature capabilities including stealth and modern sensors, and is designed to fulfill roles including aerial reconnaissance, radar jamming, air-to-air combat and air-to-surface combat. It will be piloted by artificial intelligence. On 5 June 2024, Airbus announced a partnership with European AI defense company Helsing to develop the Wingman's AI system.

The Wingman would be controlled by a commanding crewed fighter, the initial aircraft proposed for this role is the Eurofighter Typhoon, though Airbus has left open the possibility that other fighters or aircraft could be adapted to fit the role. According to Airbus, the F-35 Lightning, Dassault Rafale and Saab Gripen fighters as well as the A400M Atlas transport and A330 MRTT tanker could be adapted to command Wingman aircraft. Airbus has stated that human pilots in the command aircraft would always be the "final decision making authority" in combat and would "always have control of the mission".

In November 2026, Airbus announced that it was pausing development on the Wingman to focus instead on its Airbus Ravenstorm platform. Airbus said it was leaving the option open to return to the Wingman, but that it would not be able to be fielded in time for the German Air Force's tightened timeline requirements.

== Potential operators ==
As of June 2024, Airbus is working with the German Air Force to use the Wingman to meet their requirement of an aircraft which can augment their Air Force before the introduction of the Future Combat Air System in the 2040s. Airbus is also reportedly in negotiations with the Spanish Air and Space Force for possible purchases. The Royal Air Force and Italian Air Force are both also current users of the Eurofighter; a spokesperson from the United Kingdom declined to confirm or deny whether the country's air force was interested in the Wingman.

== Specifications ==
Data from Airbus.

General characteristics

- Length: 50 ft 10 in (15.5 m)
- Wingspan: 39 ft 4 in (12 m)

Performance

- Maximum speed: Mach 1 (estimated)

== See also ==
- Loyal wingman

Aircraft of comparable role, configuration, and era

- Boeing MQ-28 Ghost Bat
- General Dynamics X-62 VISTA
- HAL CATS Warrior
- Kratos XQ-58 Valkyrie
- Kronshtadt Grom
- Spirit Mosquito
- Sukhoi S-70 Okhotnik
