= BAE Systems Brontanax =

Prototype British military drone

Brontanax

General information
- Type: Loyal Wingman UCAV
- National origin: UK
- Manufacturer: BAE Systems
- Status: In Development
- Primary user: Royal Air Force (potentially)
- Number built: Prototype

History
- First flight: 2027 (planned)

Brontanax is a British loyal wingman drone designed and built by BAE Systems. The aircraft is designed to operate alongside manned combat aircraft to offer them additional electronic warfare and strike capabilities. It was unveiled to the public in July 2026 at the Farnborough International Airshow and has been selected by the Royal Air Force as an operational concept demonstrator for its StormFighter programme. With a prototype already assembled, Brontanax represents the first CCA to be built in the UK, with a production line to be set up and a first flight planned for 2027.

== Development ==
Following its concept stage in 2022, Brontanax was developed in a self-funded endeavour by BAE Systems' FalconWorks division, involving over 500 employees and 75 suppliers across the United Kingdom. It was specifically designed to meet the RAF's needs, although it will also be offered to overseas customers. During its development, BAE Systems drew upon 25 years' worth of technology and expertise from its previous drone projects, such as Corax, Herti, Mantis and, particularly, Taranis. In February 2024, a subscale model of the drone was displayed at the World Defense Show in Saudi Arabia, while a full-scale, pre-series, and pre-production prototype was assembled at BAE Systems' plant in Warton, Lancashire. In July 2026, the prototype was officially unveiled at the Farnborough International Airshow.

== Design ==
Brontanax is an unmanned combat aerial vehicle (UCAV) designed around the concept of manned-unmanned teaming. It is designed to fly alongside manned combat aircraft as a "loyal wingman", providing them additional strike and electronic warfare capabilities, as well as enhanced information-gathering and survivability. The aircraft is remotely-controlled by a pilot in one of the accompanying manned aircraft or by a mission commander at range, although it is also capable of operating autonomously. Designed with affordability in mind, Brontanax is designed to offer a more cost-effective option than a manned combat aircraft but with around 70-80% of the same capabilities. The aircraft is of a similar size to a BAE Systems Hawk, with a maximum take-off weight of over 5 tonnes, and is equipped with internal weapons bays large enough to carry any weapon currently in the RAF inventory. The prototype uses an American Williams International engine but production versions may use an Orpheus engine provided by Rolls Royce.

== History ==
=== United Kingdom ===
The Royal Air Force has studied unmanned collaborative combat aircraft since at least 2015, culminating in the launch of the Lightweight Affordable Novel Combat Aircraft (LANCA) programme in 2019. For this programme, the Ministry of Defence (MOD) awarded a contract to Spirit AeroSystems to design and build a flyable technology demonstrator, known as Mosquito, but this effort was cancelled in 2022 due to costs. In 2026, the British government's Strategic Defence Review outlined a continued need for a CCA and its subsequent Defence Investment Plan allocated £300 million towards its acquisition. On 16 July 2026, the StormFighter programme was announced, with the MOD selecting Brontanax as its operational concept demonstrator. Designed and built in the UK, Brontanax offers the UK a fully sovereign option, unlike competing options from overseas, and is the first and only British CCA that has been built. The drone will be flight tested alongside a Eurofighter Typhoon aircraft by the end of 2027 during Exercise Steadfast Defender. Its introduction into service is part of the RAF's efforts to become the first "sixth-generation air force" in Europe, flying alongside Typhoon, Lightning and, later, Tempest combat aircraft.

The Royal Navy has undertaken its own studies into large fixed-wing drones operating from its two Queen Elizabeth-class aircraft carriers, under Project Vixen. According to BAE Systems, a modified Brontanax could fulfill this need as extensive simulation and integration analysis has confirmed it is carrier-capable, without the need of a catapult.

== Operators ==
United Kingdom

- Royal Air Force (from 2027; evaluation)
