= Northrop Grumman YFQ-48 Talon Blue =

Unmanned combat aircraft under development by Northrop Grumman

YFQ-48 Talon Blue
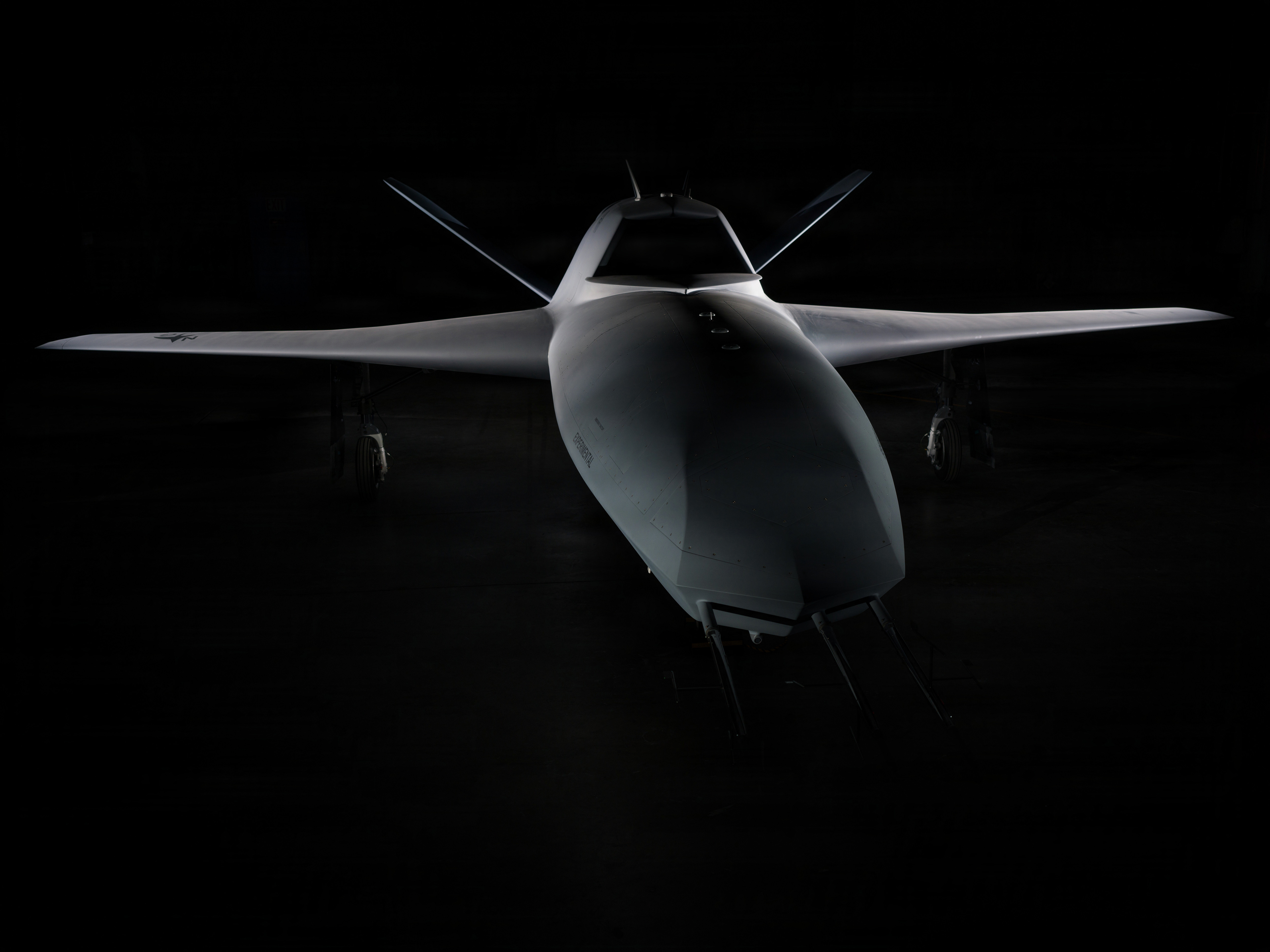
- YFQ-48 undated photo

General information
- Type: Unmanned combat aerial vehicle; Loyal wingman drone
- National origin: United States
- Manufacturer: Northrop Grumman, Scaled Composites
- Status: Under development
- Primary user: United States Air Force

History
- First flight: 3 October 2026

The Northrop Grumman YFQ-48 Talon Blue, is a loyal wingman type unmanned combat aerial vehicle (UCAV) currently under development by Northrop Grumman. The aircraft is one of the designs competing for Increment II of the United States Air Force's Collaborative Combat Aircraft (CCA) program and is intended to augment crewed fighter aircraft such as the F-15EX Eagle II, F-22 Raptor, F-35 Lightning, and the planned Next Generation Air Dominance fighter for air-to-air missions through manned-unmanned teaming (MUM-T).

== Development and design ==
The YFQ-48 was developed using lessons from Northrop Grumman's failed bid for Increment I of the U.S. Air Force CCA program. The company had submitted a design that was larger and more expensive than the ones that were selected to move forward with Engineering and Manufacturing Development (EMD), the General Atomics YFQ-42 and Anduril YFQ-44. Based on this feedback, Northrop Grumman and its subsidiary Scaled Composites, under the codename "Project Lotus", began developing a follow-on unmanned aerial system that was smaller, simpler, and less expensive, with 50% fewer parts and 1,000 lb (454 kg) lighter in weight. "Project Lotus" was later renamed "Project Talon", and the design would receive the YFQ-48 designation from the USAF in December 2025, with first flight projected in 2026.

The YFQ-48 is an unmanned aerial vehicle with a long, slender fuselage, swept lambda wings, V-tails, and air inlet mounted on top of the fuselage. It is powered by a PW500 variant. The main landing gears are widely spaced and retract into the wings.

The YFQ-48A made its first test flight on 3 October 2026.

== See also ==
Aircraft of comparable role, configuration, and era

- Boeing MQ-28 Ghost Bat
- General Atomics FQ-42 Dark Merlin
- Anduril FQ-44

Related lists

- List of unmanned aerial vehicles
