= Anduril FQ-44 Fury =

Unmanned combat aircraft under development by Anduril

FQ-44 Fury
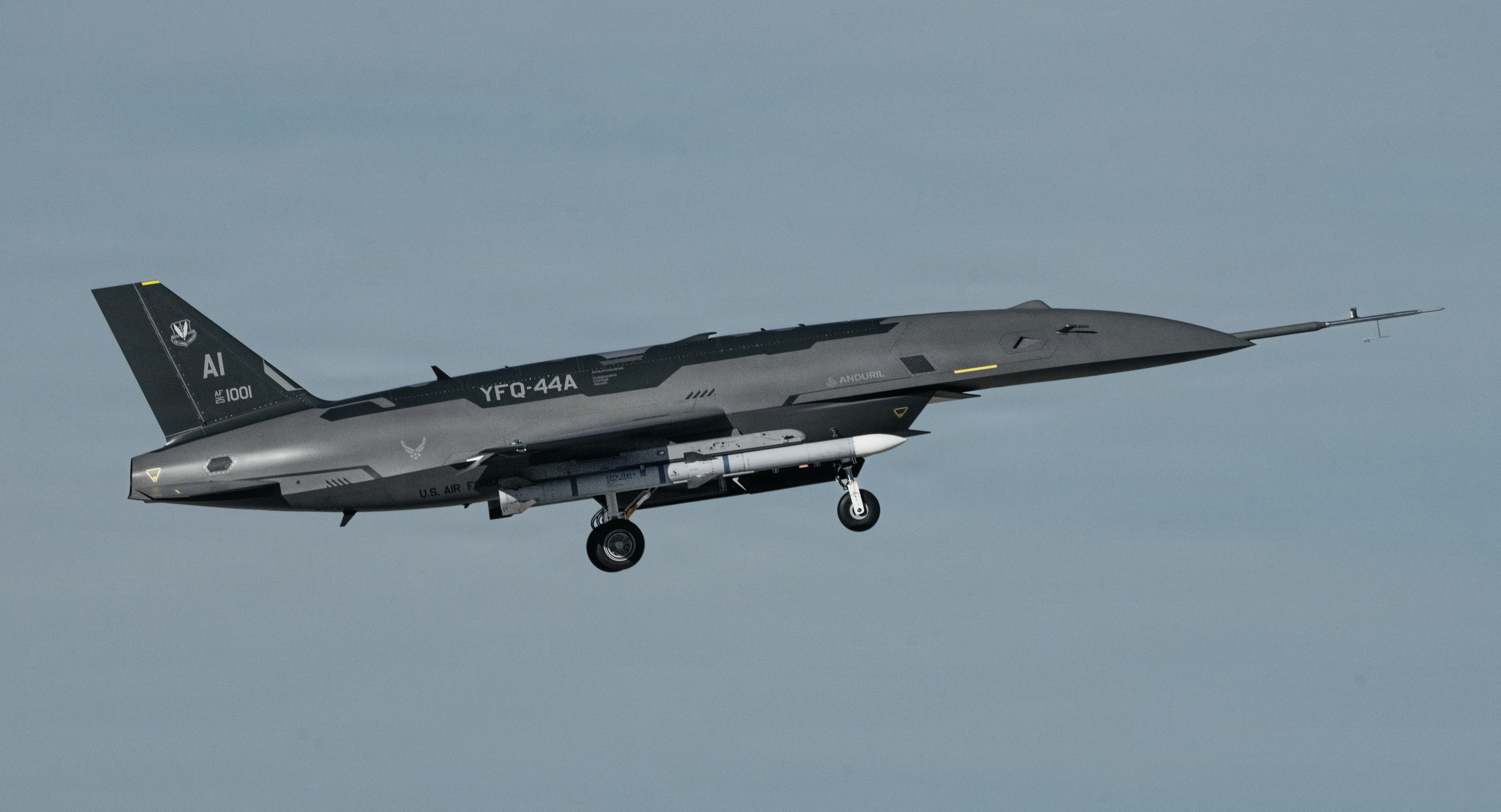
- YFQ-44 armed with an inert AIM-120 AMRAAM

General information
- Type: Loyal wingman capable multirole unmanned fighter aircraft
- National origin: United States
- Manufacturer: Anduril Industries
- Status: Under development
- Primary user: United States Air Force
- Number built: At least 3

History
- First flight: 31 October 2025

The Anduril FQ-44 Fury is an American multirole unmanned fighter aircraft with loyal wingman capabilities, currently under development by Anduril Industries. The aircraft is one of the winning designs along with the General Atomics FQ-42 Vengeance for Increment I of the United States Air Force's Collaborative Combat Aircraft (CCA) program and is intended to augment crewed fighter aircraft such as the F-15EX Eagle II, F-22 Raptor, F-35 Lightning, and the planned Boeing F-47 fighter for air-to-air missions through manned–unmanned teaming (MUM-T).

== Development and design ==
The FQ-44 was originally designed by Blue Force Technologies as an aggressor platform, initially called "Grackle" before being renamed "REDmedium" and eventually "Fury", to simulate high-end threats. Blue Force Technologies was acquired by Anduril in 2023, and the Fury design was adapted as a submission for the U.S. Air Force's (USAF) CCA program. The design was eventually selected as one of the two winners of the Increment I CCA alongside the General Atomics YFQ-42.

The Fury's design as of 2023 is a fighter-like UCAV that is approximately half the dimensions of an F-16 Fighting Falcon. Its configuration consists of swept trapezoidal wings, a chin-mounted inlet, a cruciform tail arrangement with stabilators and a single vertical stabilizer, and weapons mounted on external hardpoints. The aircraft is designed to fly at up to 50,000 feet (15,200 m) and Mach 0.95, and capable of pulling a maximum of 9 g, while sustaining up to 4.5 g at about 20,000 feet (6,100 m). The Fury is to be powered by a single Williams FJ44-4M turbofan engine producing 4,000 pounds-force (17.8 kN) of thrust and has a maximum gross takeoff weight of 5,000 pounds (2,270 kg). The design is expected to provide the USAF with "affordable mass" to augment its crewed fighters in air-to-air missions; its low cost nature, while not "attritable," enables users and commanders to take greater risks with them. A mockup of the design was showcased during a September 2024 USAF conference.

The aircraft received its formal designation during the 2025 Air & Space Forces Association symposium. Flight testing was expected to begin in the summer of 2025, but it was still delayed into September 2025. The first flight occurred on 31 October 2025.

On 17 June 2026, the Air Force announced it had selected both the Fury and General Atomics' YFQ-42 for an initial production contract, with a combined 150 FQ-44s and FQ-42s to be built by 2030. In September 2026 the FQ-44 was officially given the popular name of Fury by the Air Force.

== Variants ==
- YFQ-44A: Prototype aircraft tested by the U.S. Air Force.
- FQ-44A: Production aircraft selected for the U.S. Air Force.

== Operators ==
United States

- United States Air Force

== Specifications (estimated) ==
Data from The War Zone FlightGlobal

General characteristics

- Crew: 0 onboard
- Length: 20 ft (6.1 m)
- Wingspan: 17 ft (5.2 m)
- Max takeoff weight: 5,000 lb (2,268 kg)
- Powerplant: 1 × Williams FJ44-4M turbofan, 4,000 lbf (18 kN) thrust

Performance

- Maximum speed: Mach 0.95
- Service ceiling: 50,000 ft (15,000 m)
- g limits: +9 / −3

Armament

- Hardpoints: 2 × weapons stations (each capable of using a twin adaptor rack) , with provisions to carry combinations of:
  - Rockets:
    - Rocket-pods for 70 mm rockets including Hydra 70 (future)
  - Missiles:
    - 4 × AIM-120 AMRAAM BVR air-to-air missiles
    - Barracuda-500 cruise missiles (future)
  - Bombs:
    - Joint Direct Attack Munition (JDAM) guided kit equipped 500 pounds (230 kg) bombs (future)
    - GBU-39 Small Diameter Bomb (SDB) precision-guided glide bombs (future)

== See also ==
Aircraft of comparable role, configuration, and era

- Bayraktar Kızılelma
- Boeing MQ-28 Ghost Bat
- General Atomics FQ-42 Vengeance
- Northrop Grumman YFQ-48
- TAI Anka-3

Related lists

- List of unmanned aerial vehicles
