= Unmanned fighter aircraft =

Class of military vehicles

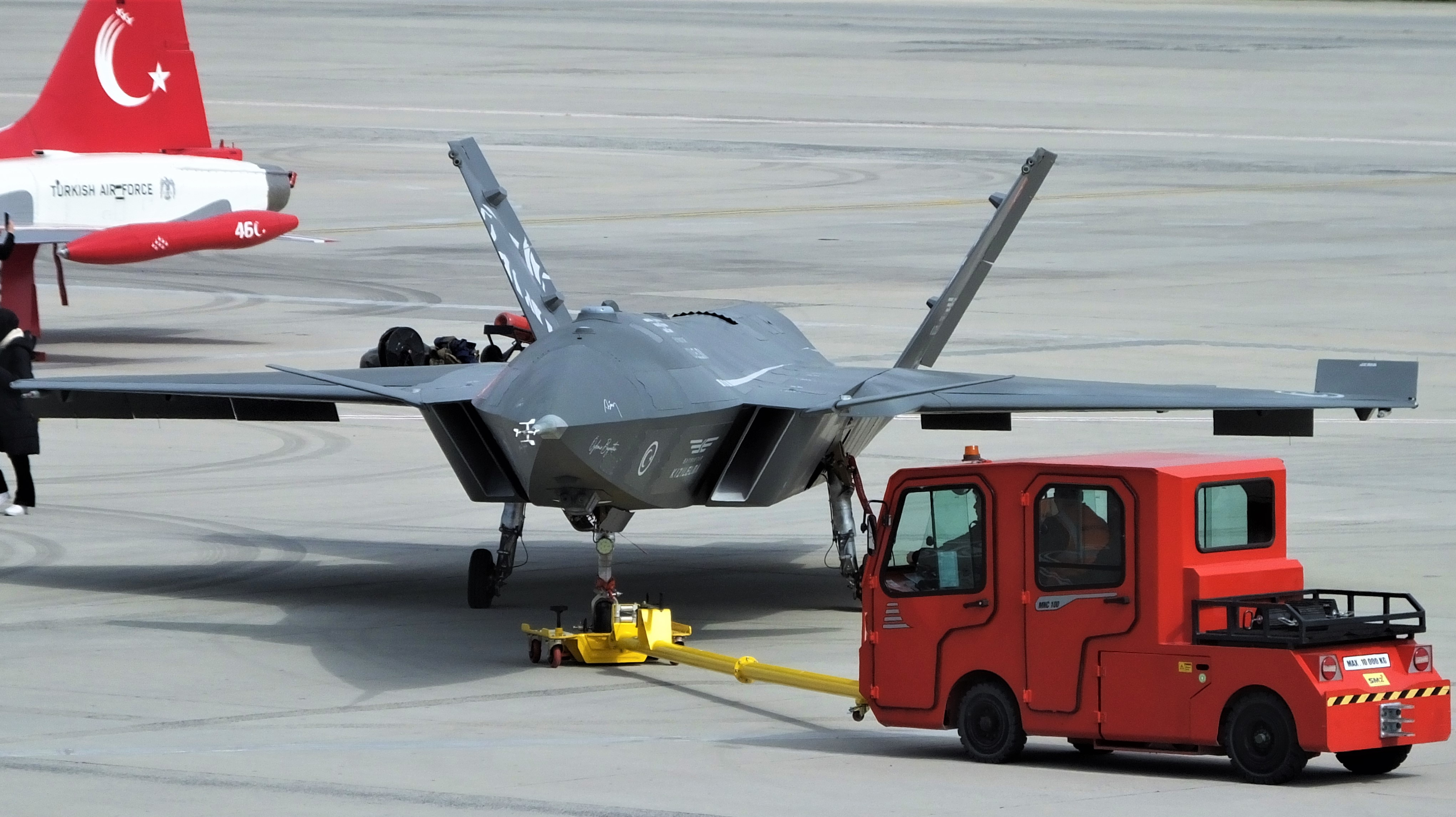
- Bayraktar Kızılelma is the world's first serially produced and operational unmanned fighter aircraft, enter operational service in 19 November 2026
- Classification: Aircraft
- Industry: Arms
- Application: Aerial warfare
- Invented: 2025 (1 year ago)

Unmanned fighter aircraft (UFA); also known as an unmanned fighter, fighter drone, or autonomous fighter aircraft, is a class of military unmanned combat aerial vehicles (UCAVs) designed for air-to-air combat and high-performance tactical maneuvers without an onboard human pilot. While traditional UCAVs were optimized primarily for intelligence, surveillance, target acquisition, reconnaissance (ISTAR), or ground strikes, unmanned fighters possess capabilities similar to crewed fighter jets. These capabilities include high speed, stealth, extreme maneuverability, advanced artificial intelligence (AI), and beyond-visual-range (BVR) missile integration. Several unmanned fighter aircraft are designed for multirole operations, featuring both air-to-air and surface-attack capabilities. Powered by artificial intelligence, unmanned fighter aircraft such as the Bayraktar Kızılelma and Shield AI X-BAT are capable of full autonomy, while platforms like the Anduril FQ-44 are designed to operate semi-autonomously based on mission requirements. An unmanned fighter aircraft can also serve as a loyal wingman drone when designed for that role.

== History and development ==
Unmanned aerial vehicles originated as target drones and early radio-controlled airframes. Early operational unmanned combat aerial vehicles, such as the General Atomics MQ-9 Reaper, focused on reconnaissance and air-to-ground strike missions. However, these propeller-driven drones lacked the speed and maneuverability needed to survive in contested airspace against enemy air defense systems or manned fighter jets.

To solve this problem, defense developers in the 2010s and early 2020s began projects for stealthy, jet-powered drones. Jet-powered platforms like the Northrop Grumman X-47B demonstrator and the Bayraktar Kızılelma proved that autonomous aircraft could carry weapons internally and operate alongside crewed fleets.

On 18 April 2024, the USAF and DARPA announced the successful engagement of the General Dynamics X-62 VISTA, an experimental artificial-intelligence-capable aircraft, against a conventional, human piloted F-16 in the human vs artificial intelligence dogfight. On May 2, Air Force Secretary Frank Kendall III said he'd trust the AI with the ability to launch weapons. In November 2025, the Bayraktar Kızılelma used its AESA radar to lock onto a target F-16 and scored a direct hit in a simulated BVR missile fire test. On 17 December 2025, two Kızılelma performed the world's first autonomous close-formation flight by two unmanned fighter jets, using artificial intelligence.

The drive to field unmanned fighters is motivated by several factors, including the concept of "affordable mass" and the preservation of pilots' lives. According to Haluk Bayraktar, the CEO of Baykar, "There are 13,000 piloted fighter jets in the world, and we are betting that over the next four decades all of them will be autonomous." He added, "They'll be smaller, employed in riskier missions and easier to manufacture. Their numbers will be an order of magnitude higher than the fighter jets we have today."

Modern crewed stealth fighters such as the F-35A cost between $80 million and $110 million per aircraft. Military organizations aim to build unmanned fighters at approximately one-third of that cost. This allows armed forces to deploy larger numbers of aircraft to absorb enemy fire and saturate air defenses.

== Design and capabilities ==
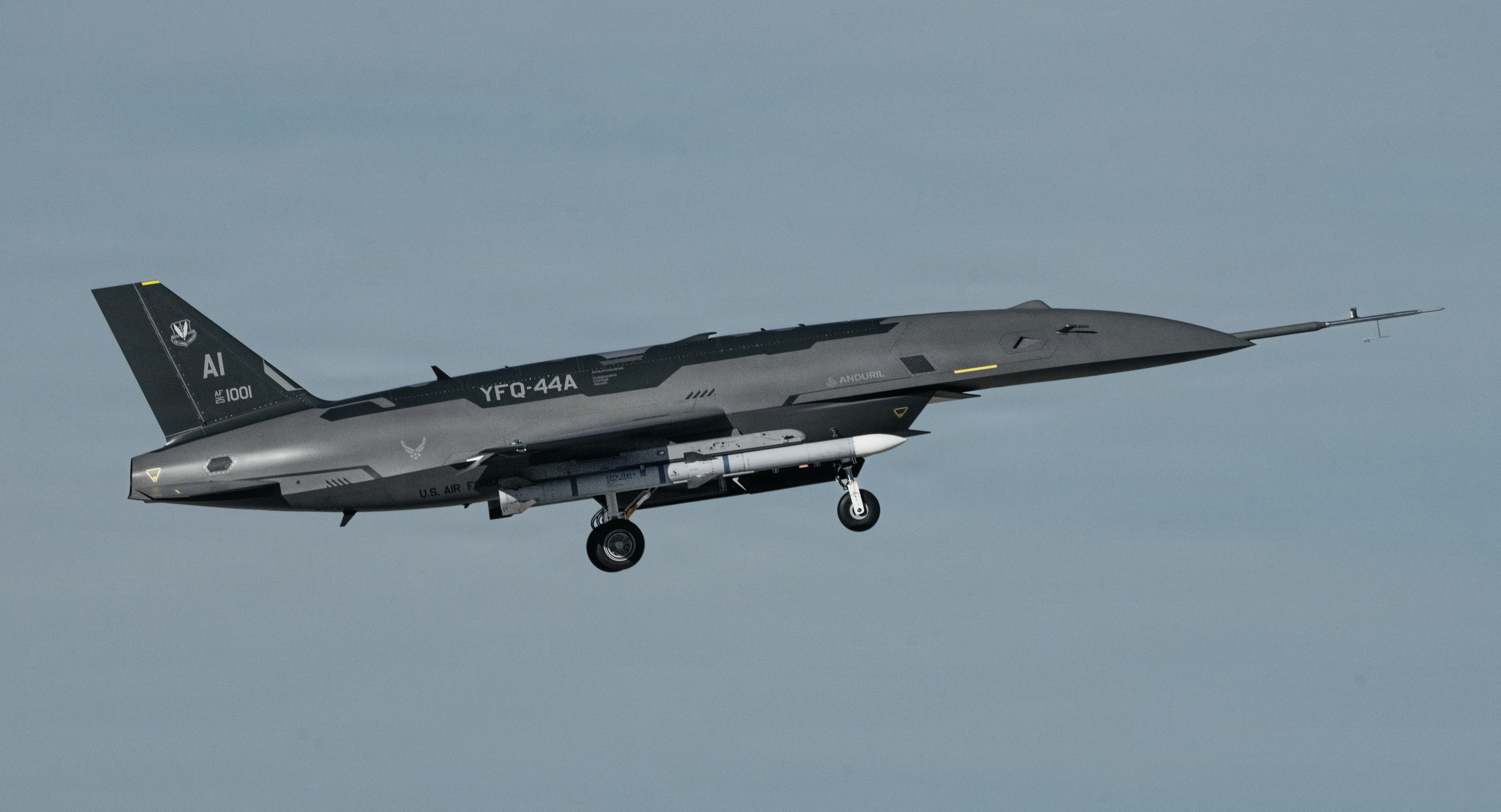
Anduril YFQ-44 armed with an inert AIM-120 AMRAAM

Unmanned fighters rely on jet propulsion to match the speed and altitude of crewed military aircraft. Most of the airframes of unmanned fighter aircraft feature low-observable (stealth) design principles, such as internal weapons bays and tailless to minimize their radar cross-section. The second serially produced Bayraktar Kızılelma drone made history by utilizing its internal weapon bay to deploy TEBER-82 and TOLUN munitions, successfully striking designated targets on July 25 and 28, 2026, respectively. Bayraktar Kızılelma also featured canard layouts to increase maneuverability.

Artificial intelligence is a core feature of the unmanned fighter. Onboard AI computers handle autonomous flight, takeoff, landing, and tactical decision-making. These systems allow the drone to carry out missions independently even when communications with human operators are jammed or severed.

Recent trials have demonstrated beyond-visual-range air-to-air combat performance. On 30 November 2025, the Bayraktar Kızılelma successfully completed an air-to-air BVR engagement test, launching a Gökdoğan missile at a target drone guided by its own radar, becoming the first autonomous unmanned fighter aircraft to do so. In 2026, the U.S. Air Force conducted successful live-fire launches of AIM-120 AMRAAM air-to-air missiles from a Anduril FQ-44 prototype.

=== Unmanned fighter and Loyal wingman ===
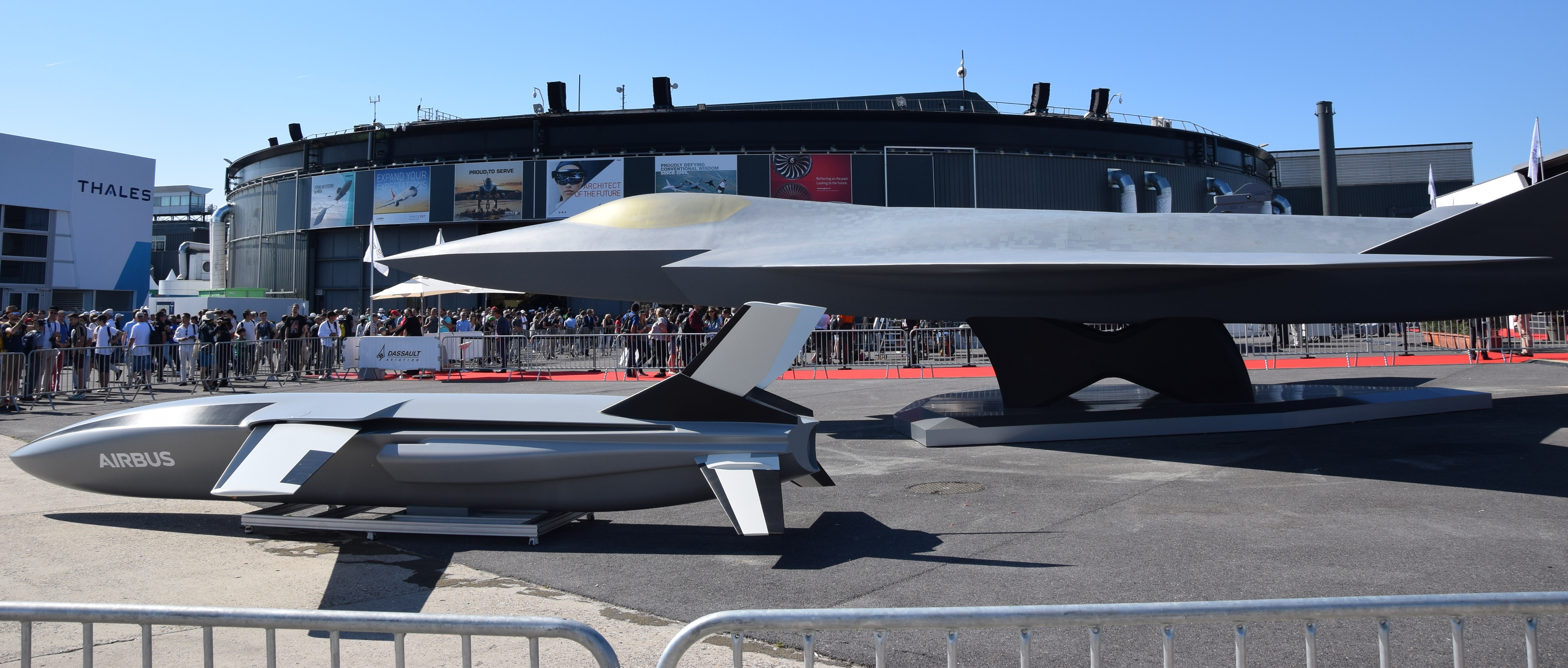
Mock-up of a fighter aircraft and a loyal wingman drone concept at the 2019 Paris Air Show

The terms unmanned fighter aircraft and loyal wingman drone describe related but distinct aviation concepts. An unmanned fighter aircraft is defined by its physical design and combat capabilities. It possesses the sensors, speed, agility, and armament required to engage in direct air-to-air combat like a traditional fighter jet.

In contrast, loyal wingman refers to an operational concept known as aerial manned-unmanned teaming (aerial MUM-T). In this role, a loyal-wingman-capable UCAV flies alongside a crewed aircraft to support human pilots and is controlled by the crew of the manned aircraft. An unmanned fighter aircraft can function equally well as a loyal wingman drone, but a loyal wingman drone is not always an unmanned fighter aircraft. Many loyal wingman drones can be used solely as supporting missile-launching platforms for manned fighter aircraft, sensor nodes, electronic warfare platforms, or decoy targets instead of possessing the full functionality of a fighter aircraft. These specialized loyal wingman drones often lack the dogfighting maneuverability, radar or other sensors needed to be classified as true unmanned fighter aircraft. An unmanned fighter aircraft can complete missions independently without requiring support from a nearby manned aircraft.

== Unmanned fighter aircraft models ==
=== In active service ===
==== Bayraktar Kızılelma ====
The Baykar Bayraktar Kızılelma is a Turkish jet-powered unmanned fighter aircraft developed by Baykar. It made its first flight on December 14, 2022. The Kızılelma is an already developed unmanned fighter and the first operational platform of its kind, entering official service in 2026 soon. The aircraft features a low radar cross-section, an AESA radar, and internal weapons bays. It has a maximum takeoff weight of 8.5 tons and can operate from short-runway aircraft carriers like the TCG Anadolu. In November 2025, Baykar integrated the TOYGUN electro-optical targeting system into the aircraft and performed autonomous close-formation flight tests with two Kızılelma platforms.

=== Under development ===
==== Anduril FQ-44 ====
The Anduril FQ-44, named "Fury," is an American unmanned fighter jet under development by Anduril Industries. The aircraft completed its maiden flight in October 2025. In June 2026, the U.S. Air Force selected the FQ-44 for initial production under Increment 1 of its Collaborative Combat Aircraft (CCA) program. The FQ-44 has a maximum takeoff weight of 5,000 pounds and reaches high subsonic speeds of Mach 0.95.

==== General Atomics FQ-42 Dark Merlin ====
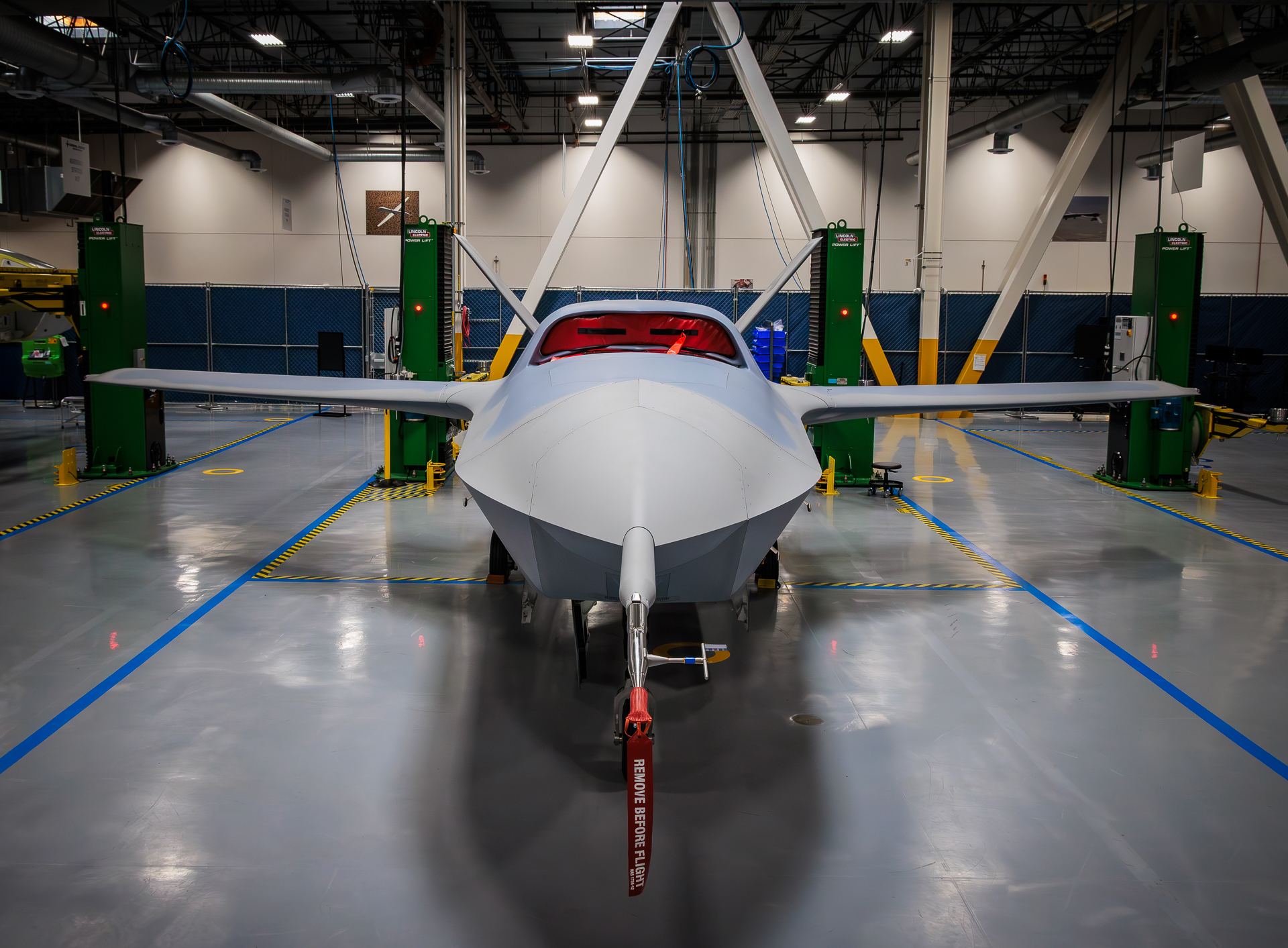
General Atomics YFQ-42A in a ground test facility.

The General Atomics FQ-42 Dark Merlin is an American unmanned fighter aircraft currently under development for the U.S. Air Force's CCA program. Derived from the XQ-67A demonstrator platform, the Dark Merlin began flight testing in August 2025. It was selected for production alongside the Anduril FQ-44 in June 2026. The airframe features a single jet engine, V-tail control surfaces, and internal weapon bays designed for air-to-air missiles.

==== CA-1 Europa ====
The CA-1 Europa is a European autonomous unmanned fighter aircraft currently under development in the three-to-five ton weight class. It is being developed by defense company Helsing alongside Grob Aircraft. The CA-1 Europa measures 11 meters in length with a 10-meter wingspan and operates at high subsonic speeds. It utilizes "Centaur AI" software for autonomous operation in contested air environments.

==== Shield AI X-BAT ====
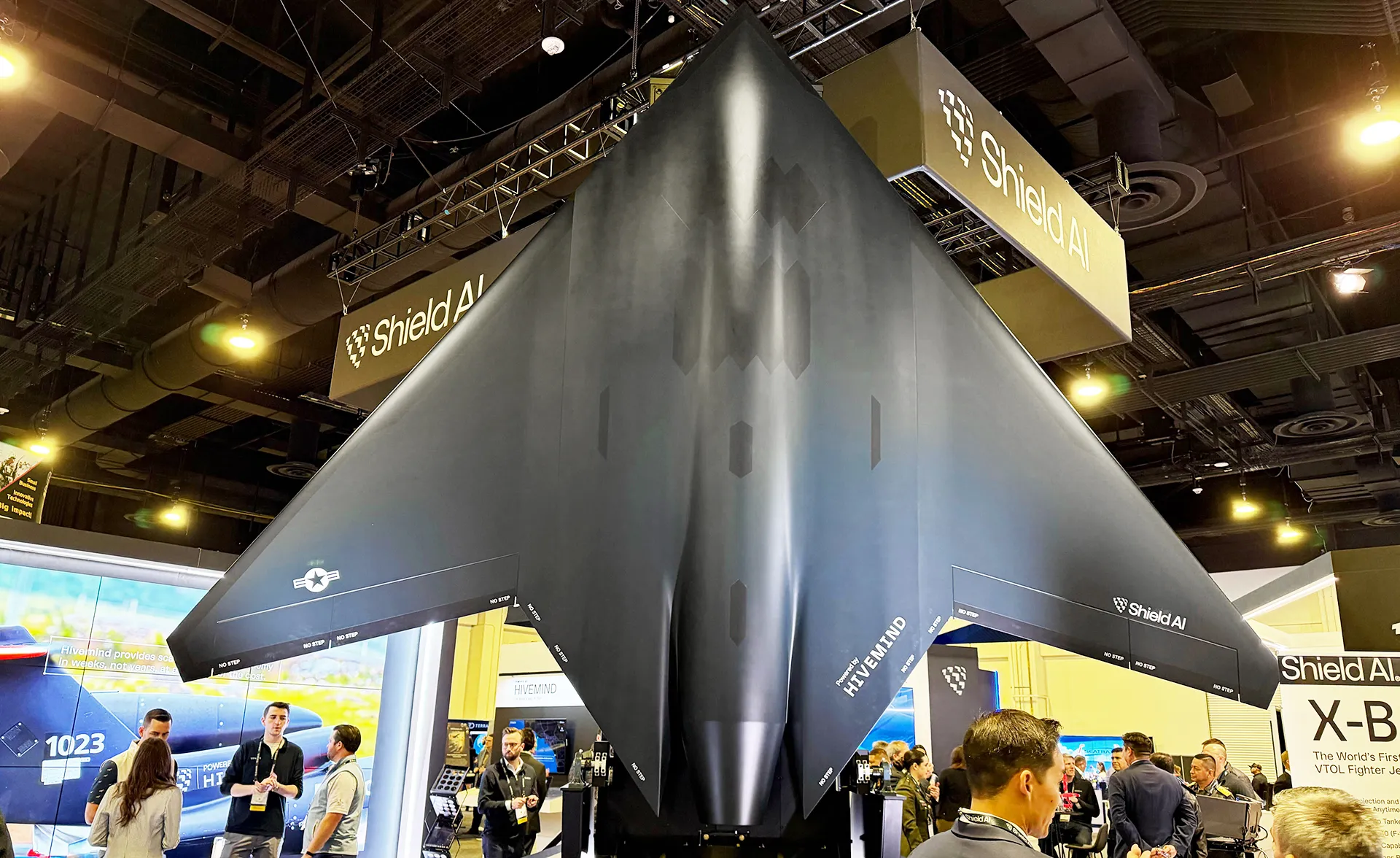
The Shield AI X-BAT model, on display at Sea-Air-Space 2026, represents the world’s first VTOL unmanned fighter aircraft design

The Shield AI X-BAT is an autonomous supersonic unmanned fighter aircraft currently under development, featuring vertical takeoff and landing (VTOL) capabilities. It uses a modified thrust-vectoring turbofan engine, allowing it to launch and land without traditional runways. The X-BAT is driven by Shield AI's Hivemind software, which enables full tactical autonomy when GPS and communications are jammed. It offers a flight range of over 2,000 nautical miles and internal weapon bays.

== See also ==
- Unmanned combat aerial vehicle
- Loyal wingman drone
- Sixth-generation fighter
- Autonomous weapon system
