= AVIC Dark Sword =

Type of aircraft

Dark Sword
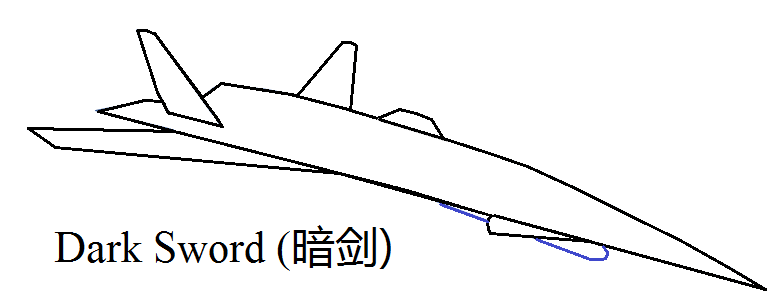

General information
- Type: Stealth unmanned combat aerial vehicle
- National origin: People's Republic of China
- Designer: Aviation Industry Corporation of China Shenyang Aircraft Design Institute
- Status: In development

History
- Manufactured: 2006

The AVIC Dark Sword (Chinese: 暗剑; pinyin: Àn Jiàn) is a stealth supersonic unmanned combat aerial vehicle from the People's Republic of China. It is being developed by the Aviation Industry Corporation of China's Shenyang Aircraft Design Institute for the air superiority or deep strike roles. Use as an autonomous wingman for manned aircraft may also be a goal.

== Development ==
A conceptual model appeared at the 2006 China International Aviation & Aerospace Exhibition Early concepts featured a conical planform, static foreplane canards, a wide tail section with canted vertical stabilizers, swept wings, and a single-engine with forward-swept chin-mounted intake. A sub-scale demonstrator may have flown by mid-2018.

An image of a full-scale mock-up or demonstrator emerged in mid-2018. It was at least 12 meters long and shared low-observability features with contemporary Chinese aircraft including a diverterless supersonic inlet.

The drone could potentially be paired with Chengdu J-20 stealth fighter, specifically the twin-seat J-20S for aircraft teaming. Various "loyal wingman" prototypes, including the Dark Sword, were developed in China.

== Specification ==
Data from https://www.ainonline.com/aviation-news/defense/2018-06-12/china-reveals-supersonic-ucav
https://www.asianmilitaryreview.com/2019/06/chinas-next-generation-unmanned-assassins/
https://www.thedailybeast.com/how-soon-will-chinas-dark-sword-stealth-drone-be-airworthy

General characteristics

- Crew: 0
- Capacity: 0
- Length: 15 m (49 ft 3 in)
- Width: 14 m (45 ft 11 in)
- Gross weight: 13,000 kg (28,660 lb)
- Max takeoff weight: 15,000 kg (33,069 lb)
- Powerplant: 1 × Guizhou WS-13 Turbofan

Performance

- Maximum speed: 1,234 km/h (767 mph, 666 kn)
- Maximum speed: Mach 1
- Combat range: 1,000 km (620 mi, 540 nmi)

Armament
Bombs/missiles

== See also ==
Aircraft of comparable role, configuration, and era

- BAE Systems Taranis
- Baykar Bayraktar Kızılelma
- Boeing MQ-28 Ghost Bat
- Hongdu GJ-11
- Kratos XQ-58 Valkyrie
- Northrop Grumman X-47B
- Dassault nEUROn
- Sukhoi Okhotnik

Related lists

- List of unmanned aerial vehicles of China
