= Project Vixen =

UK Royal Navy program

Project Vixen is the name of a Royal Navy programme examining the use of fixed-wing unmanned aerial vehicles (UAVs) from its two Queen Elizabeth-class aircraft carriers. The project likely draws its name from the de Havilland Sea Vixen. The project is part of the navy's wider Future Maritime Aviation Force (FMAF) strategy to increase the use of uncrewed systems.

== Background ==
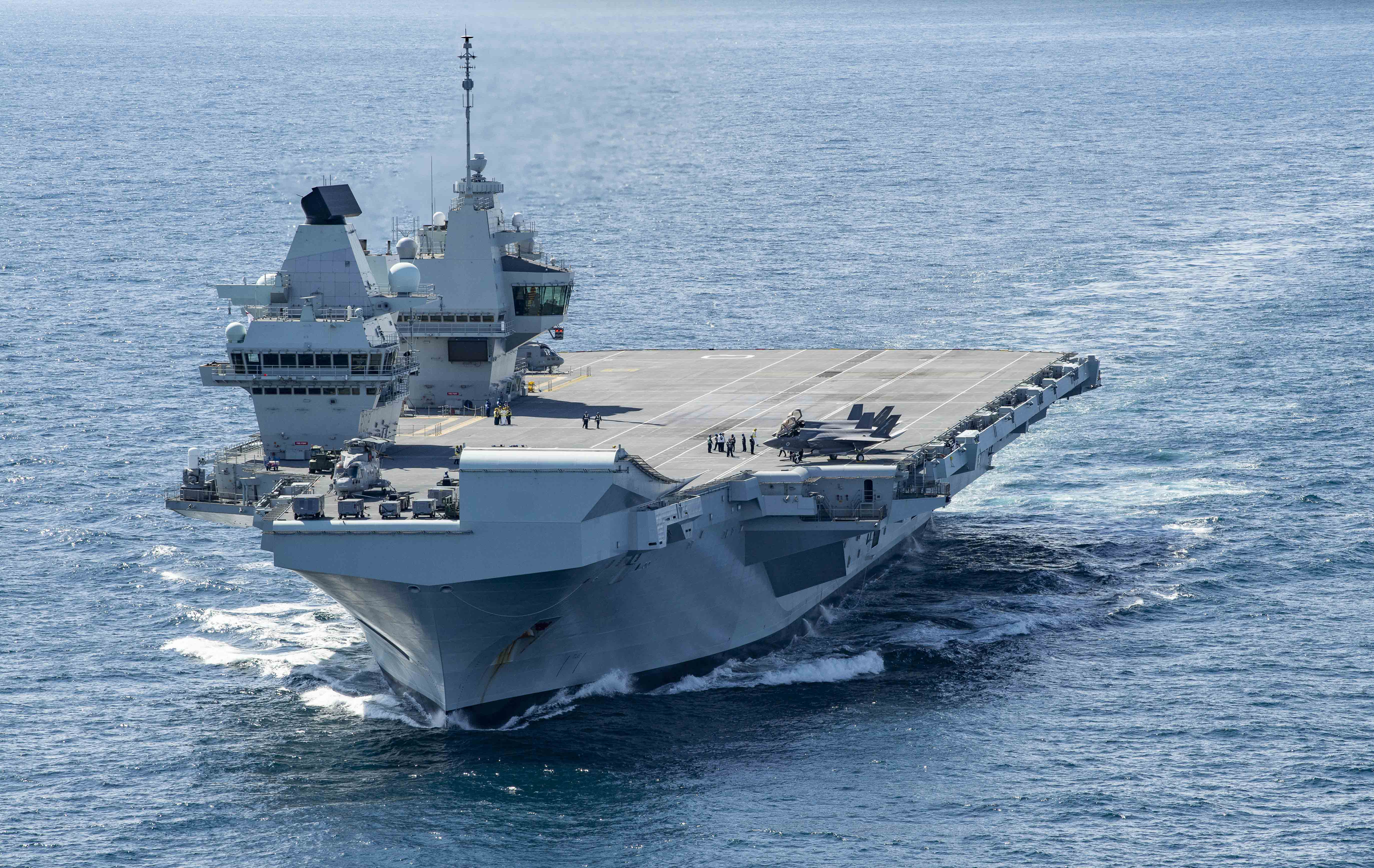
HMS Queen Elizabeth, one of two Queen Elizabeth-class aircraft carriers.

The Royal Navy operates two aircraft carriers of the Queen Elizabeth-class, HMS Queen Elizabeth (R08) and HMS Prince of Wales (R09). Both of these ships feature a short take-off and vertical landing (STOVL) configuration which means they are limited to operating STOVL aircraft, such as the Lockheed Martin F-35B Lightning II, tiltrotor aircraft, or helicopters. This has presented the Royal Navy little choice in aircraft to undertake air-to-air refuelling, carrier on-board delivery and airborne early warning missions, which are better suited to heavier catapult-assisted but arrested recovery (CATOBAR) aircraft. Fixed-wing UAVs, however, are typically lighter than conventional aircraft and, due to this, they have been considered for these missions by the Royal Navy. In 2012, speaking on the behalf of the Ministry of Defence (MOD), Defence Minister, Philip Dunne, stated publicly that he expected the Royal Navy to utilise UAVs from the Queen Elizabeth-class "at some point during their 50-year lifespans". When questioned about the prospect again, in 2016, another Defence Minister, Earl Howe, stated that the Royal Navy viewed them as an "operational advantage", adding that the Queen Elizabeth-class had extensive flight decks, hangars and engineering support facilities to accommodate them. He also revealed that the Royal Navy had evaluated capability concept demonstrators with Joint Forces Command in 2015. In January 2021, it was reported that the Royal Navy was seeking a heavy lift UAV for the aircraft carriers to assist with logistics.

== Overview ==
On 24 March 2021, Project Vixen was first revealed to the public as a programme to evaluate the use of fixed-wing UAVs from the Queen Elizabeth-class. The programme is reportedly examining their use in strike and air-to-air refuelling missions.

Under Project Ark Royal, the Royal Navy is planning to install catapults and arrestor equipment to both aircraft carriers. In March 2021, the MOD also issued a Request For Information (RFI) to the defence industry for electromagnetic catapults and arrestor cables capable of launching and recovering aircraft with a maximum weight of 24,948 kilograms (55,001 lb) and 21,319 kilograms (47,000 lb), respectively. The RFI also specified a need to install the system to the aircraft carriers within three–five years. Due to being somewhat underpowered for manned fighter aircraft, like the F-35C, the system is more likely to be used for UAV's.

According to an official Royal Navy publication, titled Future Maritime Aviation Force, which was originally published in December 2020, the Royal Navy aims to replace its helicopter-based airborne early warning (AEW) platform, the Merlin HM2 Crowsnest, with a fixed-wing UAV, currently known as Vixen, by 2030. The Royal Navy also expects to utilise Vixen in surveillance, air-to-air refueling, electronic warfare and strike roles.

In September 2021, the Royal Navy launched a fixed-wing UAV from an aircraft carrier for the first time when a Qinetiq Banshee Jet 80+ was launched from the deck of HMS Prince of Wales. The demonstration was made under a separate project, named Project Vampire, to evaluate how lightweight fixed-wing UAVs can be integrated onto the aircraft carriers. The aircraft, which is a target drone by design able to carry a sensor and weapon payload, was launched via a catapult and recovered by parachute. The larger W Autonmous Systems UAV and General Atomics Mojave were also successfully trialed in September and November 2023, respectively.

=== Potential designs ===
In 2015, the RAF launched its Lightweight Affordable Novel Combat Aircraft (LANCA) programme to deliver a fixed-wing UCAV to augment its fighter aircraft. The Spirit Mosquito, developed by Team Mosquito, was selected as a technology demonstrator for this programme. Vixen was likely to be derived from LANCA or even be identical to it; in July 2020, RAF Air Chief Marshall Sir Michael Wigston stated: “The RAF envisions an aircraft derived from LANCA's Mosquito phase being used on the Royal Navy's aircraft carriers alongside F-35B Lightnings”. However, on 24 June 2022, the MOD announced the cancellation of Project Mosquito due to other "more beneficial" and cost-effective solutions being available. It is currently unknown how this affects Project Vixen.

Royal Navy briefings have used the MQ-28 Ghost Bat, adapted with a tail hook necessary for carrier-borne recovery, as a representation of Vixen in service. In July 2024, General Atomics Aeronautical Systems proposed its Gambit 5 UCAV.

== See also ==
- Drone carrier
