= Loyal wingman drone =

Class of autonomous or semi-autonomous military aerial vehicle

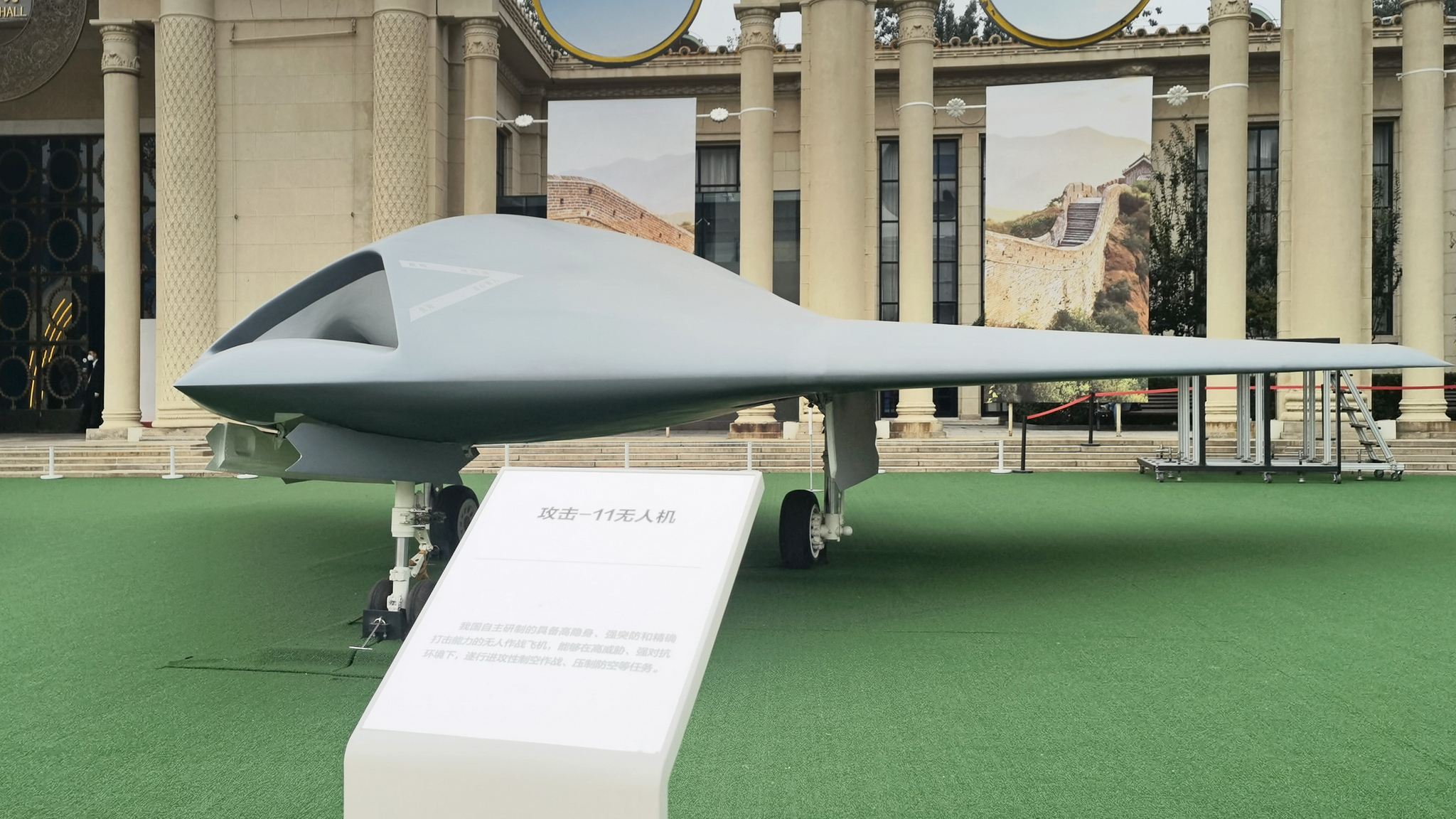
Hongdu GJ-11 loyal wingman drone

Loyal wingman drone, also referred as a collaborative combat aircraft (CCA) or autonomous collaborative platform (ACP), is a specialized class of autonomous or semi-autonomous unmanned combat aerial vehicle (UCAV) designed to perform aerial manned-unmanned teaming and operate as a force multiplier alongside crewed fighter jets and other military aircraft.

Unlike traditional ground controlled remotely piloted drones, a loyal wingman controlled by utilizing human-in-the-loop from a manned aircraft and artificial intelligence (AI) of the loyal wingman drone to fly in formation, react to changing battlefield conditions, and independently execute commands without requiring constant manual inputs from a ground operator. An unmanned fighter aircraft can function equally well as a loyal wingman drone when designed for that role, but a loyal wingman drone is not always an unmanned fighter aircraft.

== Concept of operations ==
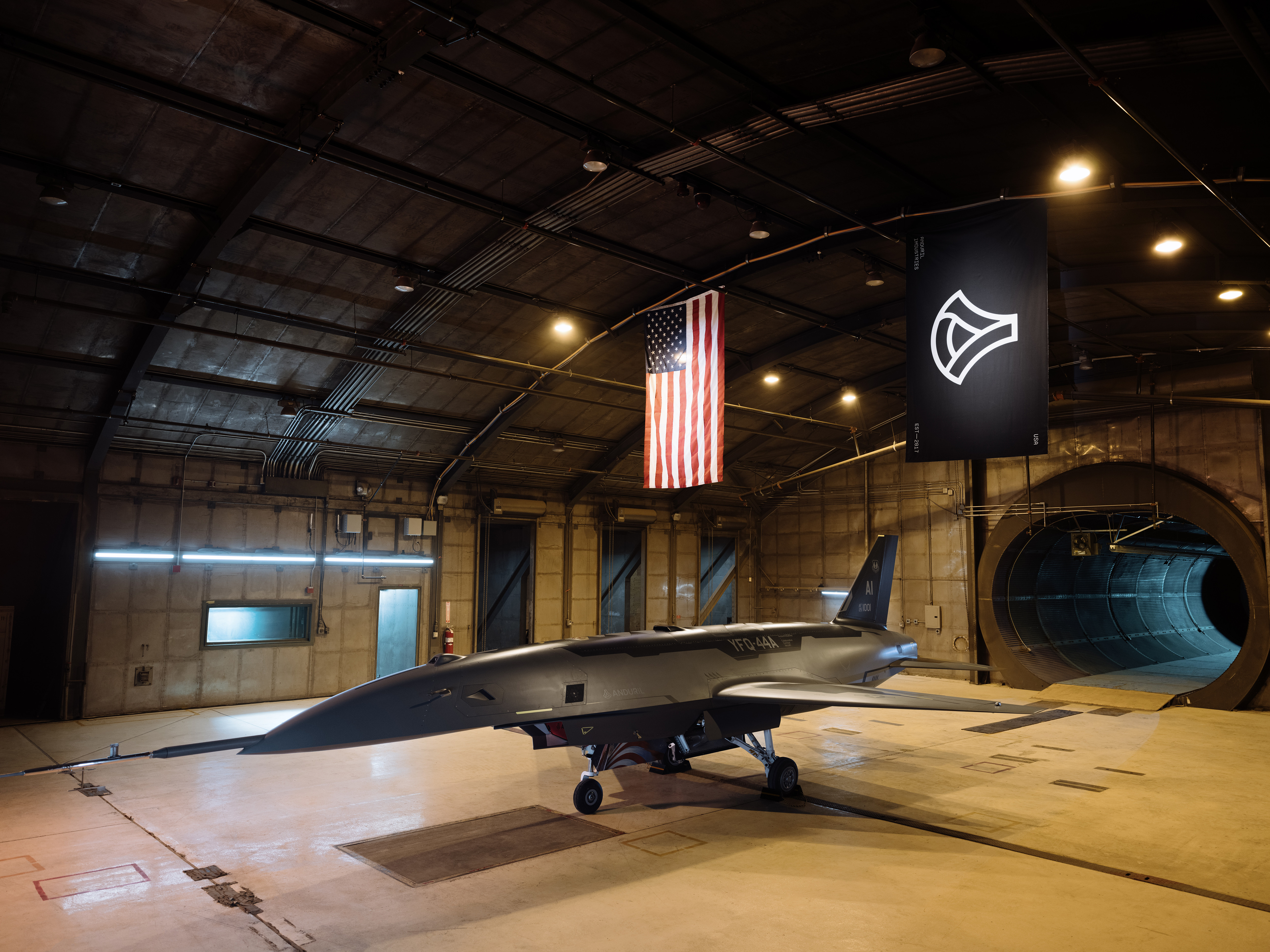
FQ-44 in a ground test facility

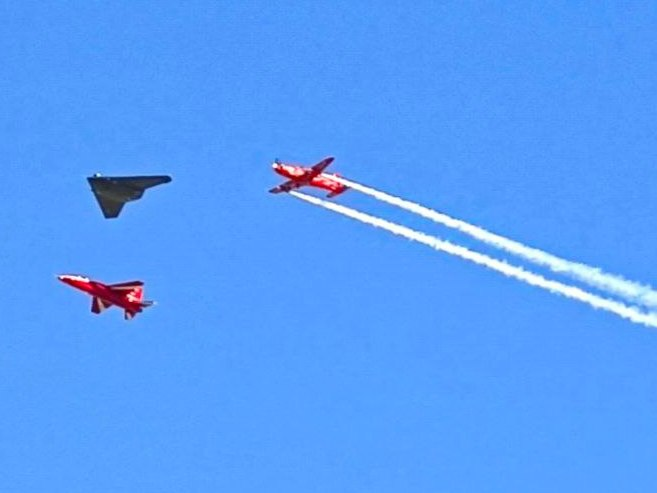
A 2024 photo of a Turkish TAI Anka-3, a drone that can perform loyal-wingman duties, flying between crewed aircraft: a TAI Hürjet, left, and a TAI Hürkuş

The primary purpose of a loyal wingman drone is to extend the capabilities and survivability of a crewed combat formation. A human pilot in a command aircraft serves as the central command node. The manned-aircraft directing a swarm or formation of uncrewed platforms that fly nearby or ahead into contested airspace.

These platforms generally are designed to be "attritable", meaning they are produced at a low enough cost that their loss in combat is strategically and economically acceptable, unlike the loss of a crewed platform or a pilot.

Loyal wingman platforms can be assigned multiple roles, including:

- Extending sensor coverage beyond the radar horizon of the crewed aircraft.
- Serving as an advanced weapons platform to deliver kinetic strikes on air or ground targets.
- Executing electronic warfare (EW) capabilities, such as jamming enemy radars or communications.
- Operating as decoys to draw enemy fire and expose air defense positions.

== Active programs ==
=== Turkey ===
Bayraktar Kızılelma flight at Teknofest

Turkey has emerged as a major developer of advanced unmanned combat aircraft, primarily through Baykar and Turkish Aerospace Industries. Two distinct jet-powered stealth platforms with loyal wingman capabilities are currently in advanced testing process.

The Bayraktar Kızılelma (English: Red Apple), developed by Baykar, is a single-engine, low-observable, carrier-capable unmanned fighter. Conceived as a multi-role fighter and loyal wingman, the Kızılelma features autonomous takeoff and landing, internal weapons bays, and an AESA radar. In late 2025, Baykar announced that the platform had entered mass production, with integration into the Turkish Armed Forces expected in 2026.

In parallel, Turkish Aerospace Industries (TAI) has developed the TAI Anka-3. The TAI Anka-3 is a jet-powered, flying wing type stealth UCAV. Its maiden flight was successfully completed on 28 December 2023. The tailless flying-wing stealth UCAV optimized for deep strike, electronic warfare, and intelligence, surveillance, and reconnaissance (ISR). Powered initially by a single turbofan engine with plans for twin-engine supersonic upgrades, the Anka-3 is designed to be used as a loyal wingman to accompany crewed platforms like the TAI TF Kaan.

=== Australia ===
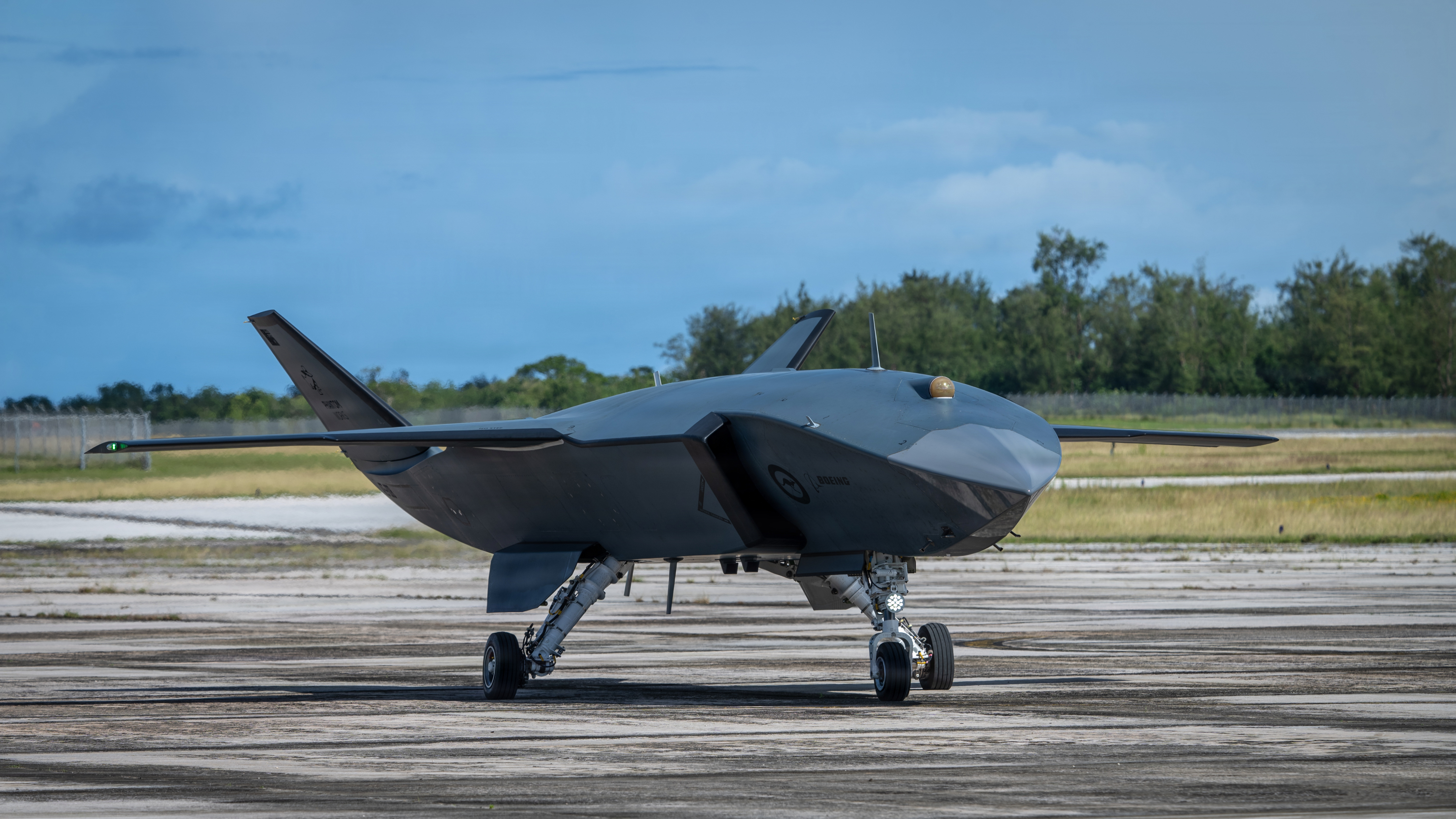
A MQ-28 Ghost Bat during the Valiant Shield 2026 exercise

Boeing Australia is leading development of the MQ-28 Ghost Bat loyal wingman for the RAAF, with BAE Systems Australia providing much of the avionics. The MQ-28 was first flown in 2021 and since then, at least 8 aircraft have been built. The aircraft was originally known as the Boeing Airpower Teaming System (ATS). The Ghost Bat features a modular nose that allows for rapid swapping of payloads for various intelligence, surveillance, and reconnaissance missions. With a range exceeding 2,000 nautical miles, the MQ-28 is designed to exhibit fighter-like performance. It has conducted cooperative operational testing with RAAF F/A-18F Super Hornets and E-7 Wedgetail airborne early warning and control aircraft.

=== United States ===
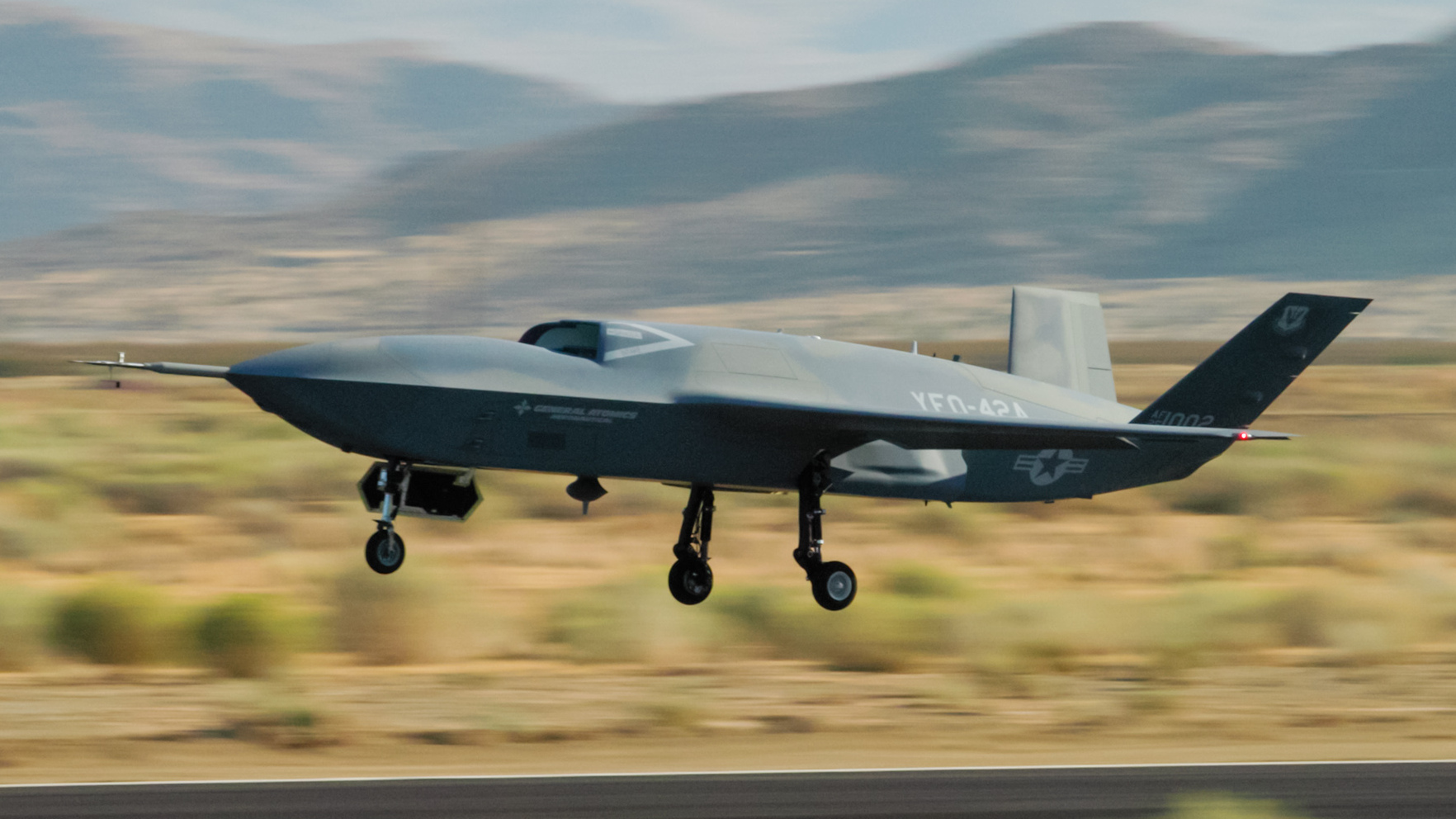
A FQ-42A takes off at a testing range in California

The United States Air Force (USAF) is one of the primary drivers of loyal wingman drone concept with its Collaborative Combat Aircraft (CCA) program. The program is an initiative to field affordable combat mass to counter proliferating stealth threats. By 2025–2026, the CCA program advanced from early prototyping into concrete operational testing with dedicated operational evaluation units.

A foundational aircraft in this domain is the Kratos XQ-58 Valkyrie, developed in partnership with the Air Force Research Laboratory (AFRL) under the Low Cost Attritable Aircraft Technology (LCAAT) portfolio. Capable of high speeds and long ranges, the XQ-58A achieved milestones such as the first-ever flight commanded by machine-learning-trained AI algorithms in 2023.

On 24 January 2024, the US Air Force awarded contracts to five contractor teams led by Anduril, Boeing, General Atomics, Lockheed Martin, and Northrop Grumman for the development of collaborative combat aircraft.

On 24 April 2024, the US Air Force announced that they had eliminated Boeing, Lockheed Martin, and Northrop Grumman from the Increment I competition and that the Anduril Fury and General Atomics Gambit would be moving forward with development. The Air Force expects to make a final decision between the two companies' offerings by 2026. As the CCA program is expected to result in multiple types of aircraft with varying capabilities and costs, all companies are expected to bid again for follow-on Increments.

On 19 September 2024, General Atomics displayed a full-scale model of a CCA. One such CCA version is a 'missile truck', which would augment the capabilities of a crewed/uncrewed mission. Anduril, a competing CCA vendor also displayed a full-scale model.

On 3 March 2025, the Air Force released a statement designating the General Atomics design the FQ-42A, and the Anduril design the FQ-44A. Both of the aircraft classified as an unmanned fighter aircraft with loyal wingman capabilities.

Northrop Grumman unveiled the Talon UCAV in December 2025.

==== Funding ====
A CCA is estimated to cost between one-half and one-quarter as much as $80 million Lockheed Martin F-35 Lightning II; the desired cost is between $25-30 million per airframe. US Air Force Secretary Frank Kendall is aiming for an initial fleet of 1,000 CCAs. As elements of a crewed-uncrewed team, two CCAs could be teamed with an NGAD or F-35, say two for each of the 200 NGAD platforms, and two for each of the 300 F-35s, in order to work out concepts to integrate them into the service, but the full inventory could be twice that size. As of 3 July 2024, the Air Force requested reprogramming an additional $150 million for CCA development in 2024. This is a 40% increase over the $392 million budget previously requested; the FY2025 budget request will reflect an additional increment; the money for NGAD was adjusted appropriately.

The 26th secretary of the US Air Force listed CCAs among his top seven priorities for the fiscal year (FY) 2024 budget request to its chief of staff. Collaborative combat aircraft are entering the FY2024 presidential budget request; Collaborative Combat Aircraft (CCA) projects are estimated to be $500 million for perhaps "100 roles" in USAF missions in FY2024. The US Air Force plans to spend more than $6 billion on its CCA programs over the next five years (2023 to 2028).

=== China ===
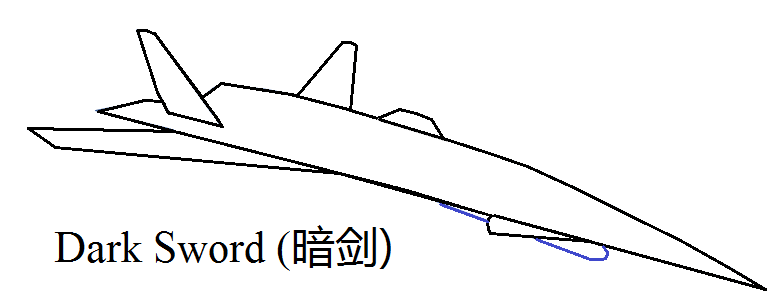
Artist impression of AVIC Dark Sword

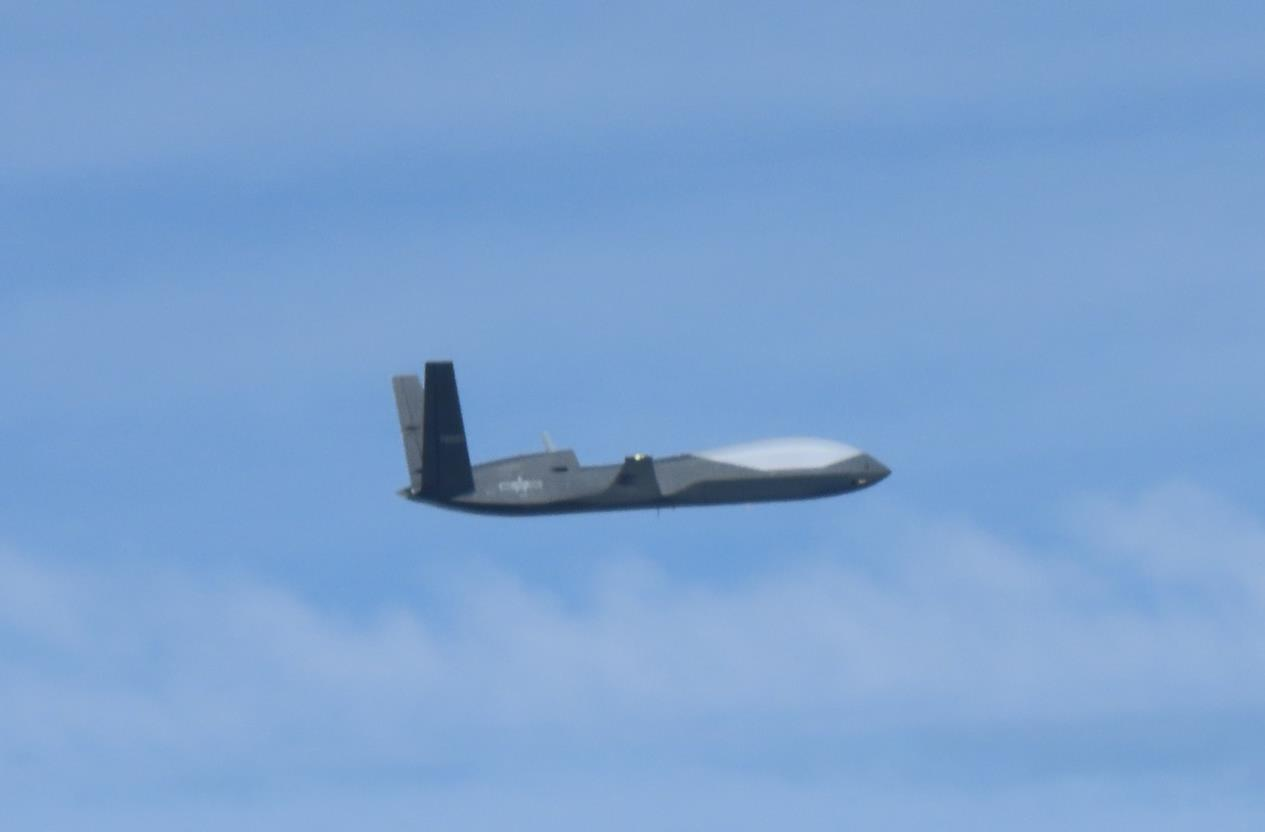
Chengdu WZ-10 flying above East China Sea

China is known to be developing various "loyal wingman" prototypes such as AVIC Dark Sword, which is a concept first revealed in 2006. As of 2019, China manufactures drones at large scale and has well-developed swarming technology. However, the planned level of autonomy and integration with these systems is not known.

The Rand Corporation reported that PLA was actively monitoring MUM-T concept developments in the United States, identifying US vulnerabilities and developing countermeasures since 2015.

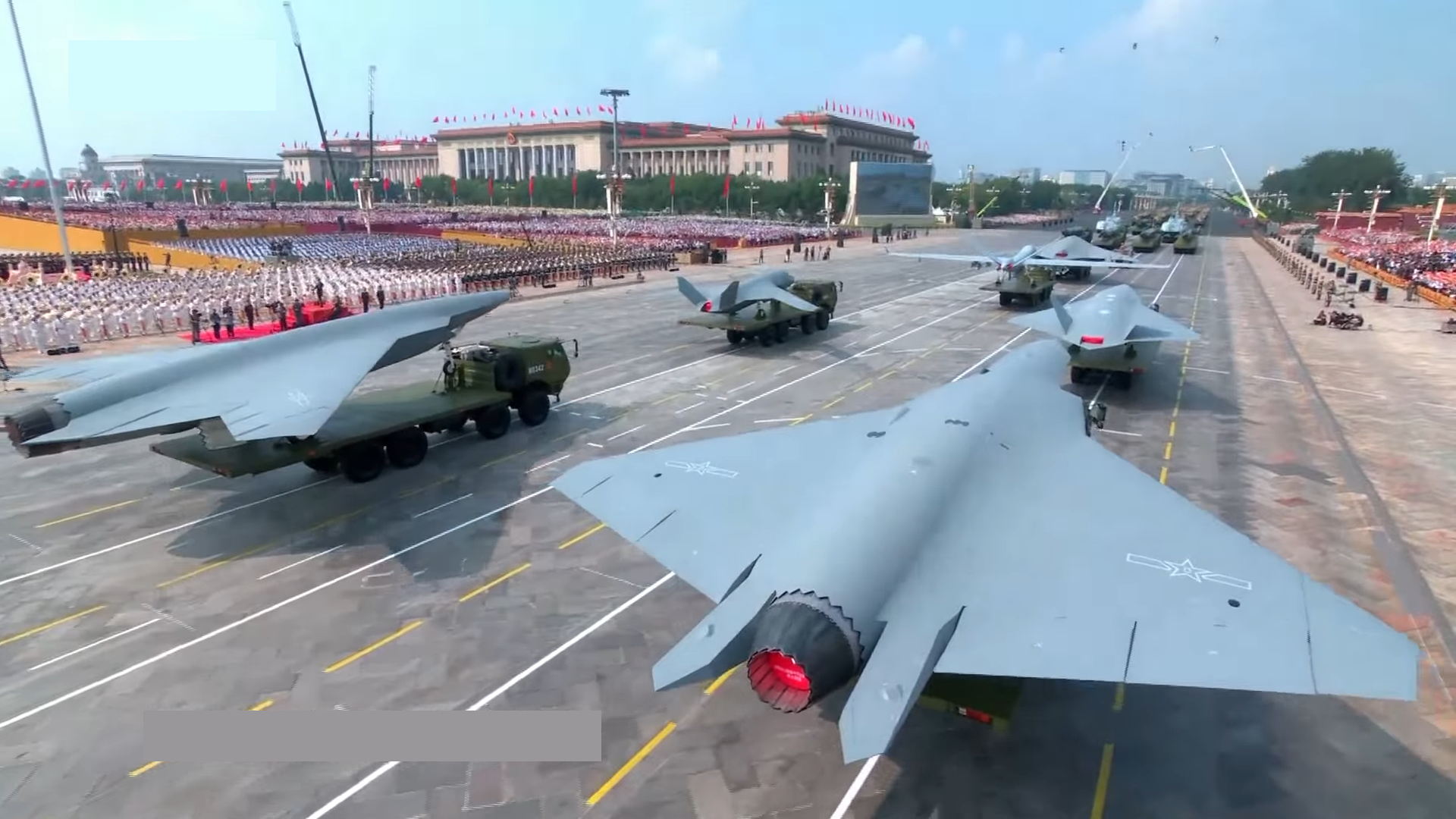
Various UCAV and loyal wingman mockups displayed at the 2025 China Victory Day Parade

One of the earliest attempts at the loyal wingman concept in China was the AVIC Dark Sword. In October 2022, Chinese media showcased the concept of the J-20 two-seater controlling stealth Hongdu GJ-11 unmanned combat aerial vehicles, and the back seat is designated for the weapons officer. It could also potentially manage the LJ-1, a low-end modular drone platform. The Chengdu WZ-10 is another drone envisioned for loyal wingman usage.

In 2021, China Aerospace Science and Technology Corporation, a Chinese state-owned defense and aerospace manufacturer, revealed the Feihong FH-97 prototype unmanned combat aerial vehicle with stealth capabilities. It was developed as a "loyal wingman" drone, designed to suppress air defenses with electronic countermeasures, fly ahead of aircraft to provide early warning, act as an expandable decoy, as well as provide reconnaissance and damage evaluation. The FH-97 can also deploy the FH-901 to strike maneuvering targets. In 2022, the company revealed Feihong FH-97A, a prototype loyal wingman drone designed to fly alongside the J-20 fighter. It can also carry up to 8 air-to-air missiles or loitering munitions and use rocket boosters to take off without a runway.

In August 2025, five different types of five different loyal wingmen prototype drones were spotted in Beijing, China, in the rehearsals for the 2025 China Victory Day Parade. Some of these designs were previously captured by satellite images at various PLAAF bases around the country. Aside from the loyal wingmen, the naval variant of the Hongdu GJ-11 flying wing UCAV and a regular Wing Loong-esque medium-altitude long-endurance (MALE) type drone were also spotted at the Parade staging area.

In the final parade on September 3, 2025, only four of the five loyal wingmen prototypes were displayed to the public. In their formation, four new stealthy uncrewed aircraft designs made their debut following the Hongdu GJ-11 and Wing Loong drones. The first design was a single dorsal intake, swept wings, and canted vertical tails, resembling Kratos XQ-58 Valkyrie. The second design featured a single dorsal intake but with sleeker, diamond-shaped wings. The third and fourth designs were notably larger (akin to the size of Chengdu J-10), with one design having a tailless lambda-shaped configuration with two caret-style engine intakes, and the second design having diamond-delta wings with two side-mounted Diverterless supersonic inlet (DSI). Unlike smaller CCAs, the two larger unmanned aircraft use larger jet engines, likely derivatives of the WS-10 or WS-15 turbofans.

A third uncrewed aircraft prototype that was spotted during the rehearsals was not presented in the final parade.

All uncrewed "loyal wingman" aircraft in the Parade were sporting serial numbers associated with the PLAAF airbases. Michael Dahm of the Mitchell Institute for Aerospace Studies believed these numbers indicated that the aircraft were undergoing test and evaluation in limited numbers at the PLAAF bases; however, there was no indication of wide-scale deployment at frontline PLAAF units.

The War Zone noted that the large unmanned aircraft China showed differed in concept from the collaborative combat aircraft (CCA), as the latter focused more on cooperativity, expandability, and affordability, whereas Chinese designs were aimed at independent operations and true fighter-like unmanned combat aerial vehicle (UCAV).

Uncrewed aircraft models shown at the 2025 China Victory Day Parade
Name	Position	Serial No.	Intake	Wing configuration	Size	Role	Note	Ref
Hongdu GJ-11 Navalized	First Roll	21 or 22	Front-mounted dorsal intake	Tailless flying-wing		Unmanned combat aerial vehicle (UCAV)	Naval variant	
CAIG Wing Loong	Second Roll		Turboprop	Standard wings		Unmanned combat aerial vehicle (UCAV)		
	Third Roll Left	53431	Front-mounted dorsal intake	Swept wings with canted V-tails	Smaller	Unmanned wingman (strike aircraft)	Similar to the FH-97 but thicker, resembling XQ-58	
	Third Roll Right	53432	Central-mounted dorsal intake	Diamond wings with canted V-tails	Smaller	Unmanned wingman (strike aircraft)		
"Type A"	Fourth Roll Left	53636	Side-mounted caret intakes	Tailless lambda wings	Larger	Unmanned air dominance fighter (air superiority)		
"Type B"	Fourth Roll Right	53536	Side-mounted diverterless supersonic intakes (DSI)	Tailless diamond-delta wings	Larger	Unmanned air dominance fighter (air superiority)	Fitted with IRST or EOTS	
	Not present		Central-mounted dorsal intake	Jagged swept wings with canted V-tails	Smaller	Unmanned wingman (strike aircraft)	Similar to the FH-97	

=== Russia ===
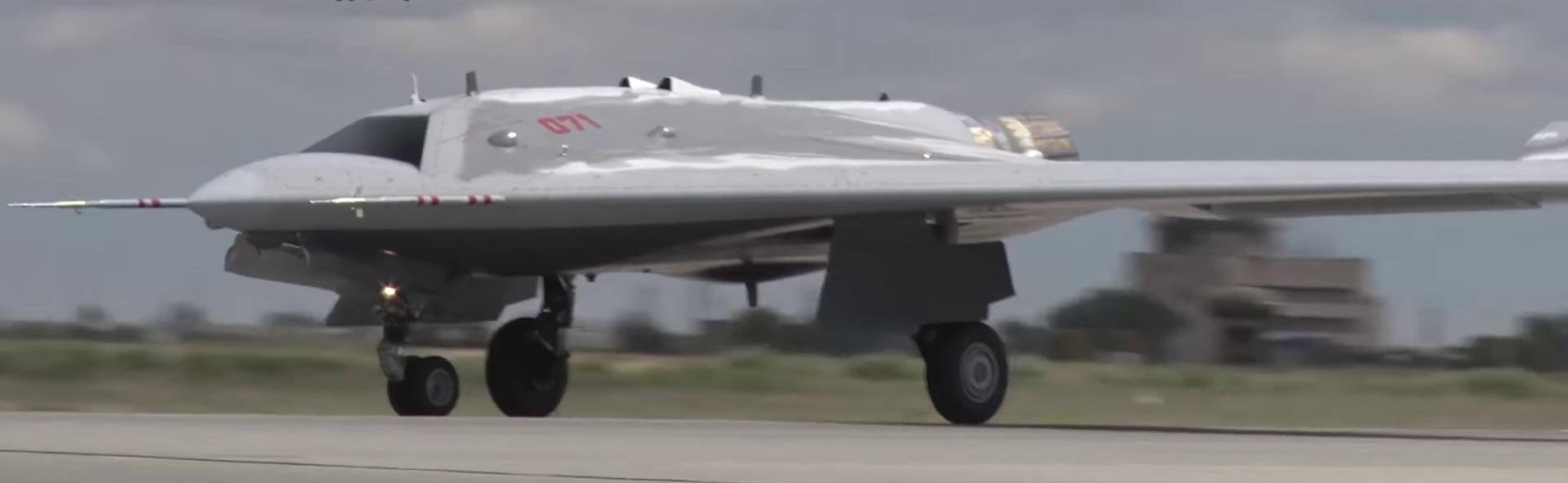
S-70 prototype 071 taxiing after 2019 maiden flight

Russian projects for wingman-class drones are thought to include the Sukhoi S-70 Okhotnik and the Kronshtadt Grom. However, although Russia already manufactured drones, the planned level of autonomy or even AI for these systems are not known.

=== France ===
French aerospace manufacturer Dassault Aviation led the development of the Dassault nEUROn. The European unmanned aircraft in the 2010s, resulting in a functional prototype. Dassault is currently developing a stealth unmanned combat aerial vehicle to complement its Dassault Rafale fighter jet in the 2030s, prior to the introduction of the Next Generation Fighter in the 2040s.

=== United Kingdom ===
The RAF in the UK has been developing the Loyal Wingman concept since 2015, with the Spirit Mosquito technology demonstrator flying in 2020. Programme funding was cancelled in June 2022 because the Ministry of Defence felt that it was better spent on less ambitious advances.

In 2026, the Royal Air Force has launched a new collaborative combat aircraft (CCA) program, named BAE Systems Brontanax, reviving a British push into the autonomous ‘loyal wingman’ arena as the service seeks to build what officials describe as “Europe’s first sixth-generation air force.”

On 22 July 2026, BAE Systems unveiled their bid for the UK's Storm fighter programme, dubbed Brontanax. A model of the aircraft was shown at Farnborough, however the company also released images of their Brontanax prototype at the company's facilities in Warton, Lancashire. The prototype currently uses a Williams engine, but the final design is due to use an engine from the Rolls-Royce Orpheus family. The final design is also intended to be compatible with the UK's Queen Elizabeth-class aircraft carriers. According to BAE Systems, ground trials are scheduled for the first half of 2027, and maiden flight in the second half of 2027. If selected by the UK armed forces, the company aims to achieve initial operating capability before 2030.

=== Joint European project ===
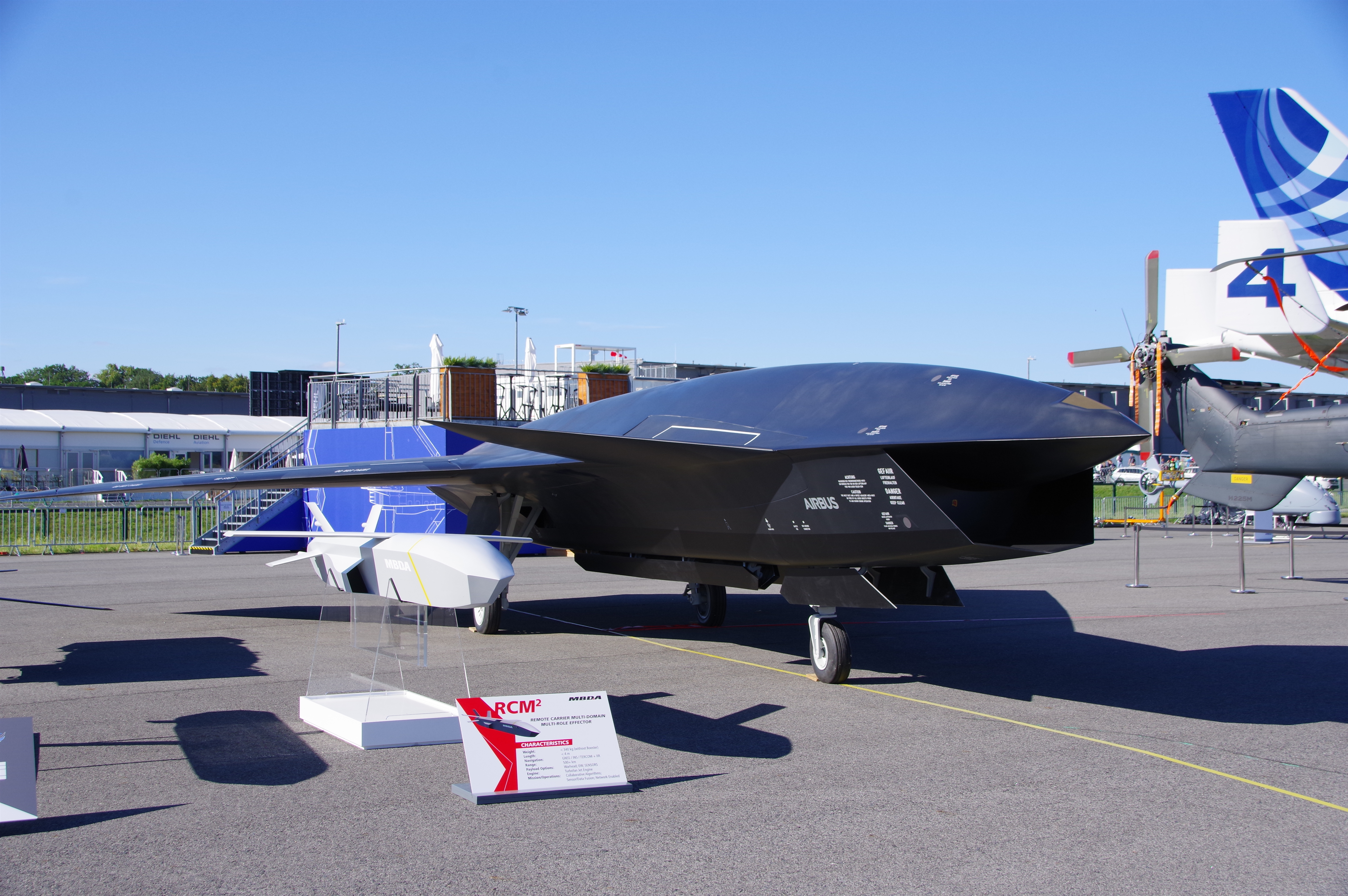
Airbus Wingman concept showcased at the ILA Berlin 2024

European aerospace manufacturer Airbus has proposed the Airbus Wingman concept meant to eventually integrate with platforms like the Eurofighter Typhoon. Airbus aims to field these capabilities by the early 2030s to provide advanced autonomous strike and reconnaissance for the German Air Force and other European allies.

=== India ===
The HAL CATS Warrior is an AI-enabled loyal wingman drone under development by Hindustan Aeronautics Ltd. (HAL) for the proposed Combat Air Teaming System (CATS). Successful completion of engine ground runs was done in 2025.

=== South Korea ===
In addition to the production of the new generation fighter, KF-21, South Korea plans to develop several types of UCAVs as wingmen to team up with the manned fighter.

=== Sweden ===
The Swedish defense company Saab AB has been developing a concept for a supersonic, stealthy unmanned loyal wingman drone. As part of a company-funded effort, Saab conducted wind-tunnel tests of a scale model in late 2021. The drone is designed to operate with piloted fighters, like the Saab Gripen, providing enhanced tactical capabilities in beyond-visual-range missions.

In August 2026, Saab unveiled the new full-scale A3-001 model, a proposed autonomous, supersonic loyal wingman drone intended to complement the crewed Gripen F and future crewed combat aircraft. Saab envisages the A3 acting as a loyal wingman and performing missions including forward sensing, precision strike and suppression of enemy air defenses. The A3 would operate autonomously while receiving high-level commands from a Gripen pilot through voice or hands-on-throttle-and-stick (HOTAS) controls. When fully developed, the concept may turn into an unmanned fighter aircraft with loyal wingman capabilities similar to the Bayraktar Kızılelma.

=== Japan ===
Japan announced a development programme for a loyal wingman drone in 2021, issuing the first round of funding in 2022. The drone is intended to be carried for deployment by a proposed F-X fighter, also under development.

=== Netherlands ===
The Netherlands signed a letter of intent with the United States for full participation in the Collaborative Combat Aircraft (CCA) program end of 2025 and ordered the first two CCA aircraft in April 2026.

== See also ==
- Unmanned combat aerial vehicle
- Sixth-generation fighter
- Swarm robotics
