= Helsing (company) =

German defence company

Helsing SE
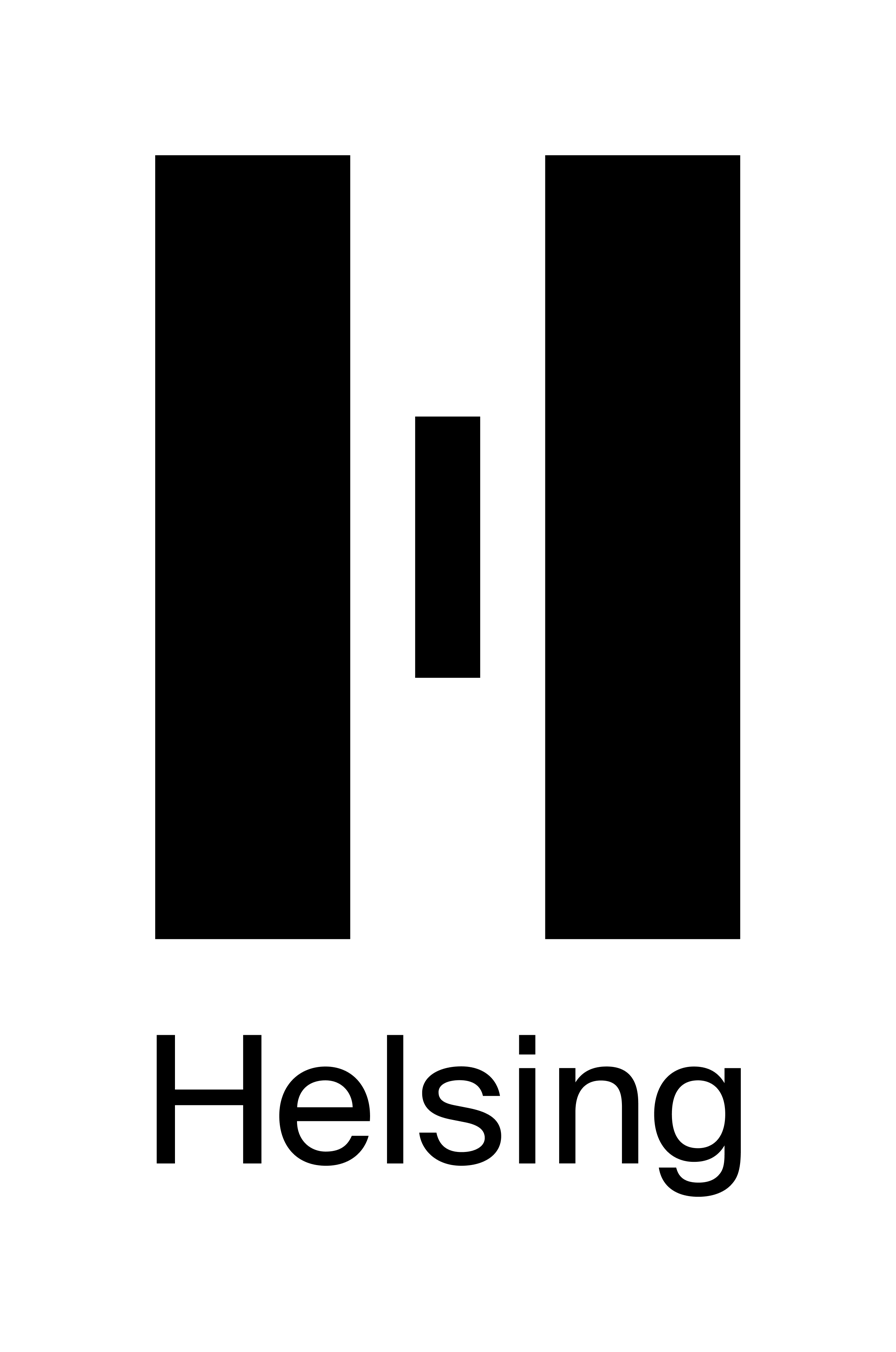
- Type: Private
- Industry: Defence; Software
- Founded: March 2021; 5 years ago
- Founders: Torsten Reil; Gundbert Scherf; Niklas Köhler
- Headquarters: Munich, Germany
- Key people: Daniel Ek (chairman); Torsten Reil (co-CEO); Gundbert Scherf (co-CEO); Niklas Köhler (president & CPO)
- Products: HF-1; HX-2; SG-1 Fathom
- Number of employees: 900 (2025)
- Subsidiaries: Grob Aircraft
- Website: helsing.ai

Helsing SE is a German defence technology company based in Munich. Founded in 2021 by Torsten Reil, Gundbert Scherf, and Niklas Köhler, the company develops military strike drones, underwater surveillance systems, and artificial intelligence software designed to enhance weapons systems and improve battlefield decision-making.

== History ==
Helsing was founded in March 2021 originally as an artificial intelligence software company by Torsten Reil, a computational biologist educated at the University of Oxford who previously founded NaturalMotion, a gaming company later acquired by Zynga; Gundbert Scherf, who previously worked in the German Ministry of Defence; and Niklas Köhler, a machine learning engineer. Their software uses AI to analyse large amounts of sensor and weapons system data, providing real-time battlefield insights that inform and enhance military decision-making. Later, Helsing started designing and manufacturing its own drones, announcing the HX-2 drones in December 2024. Based in Munich, the company has established subsidiaries in Estonia, France, and the United Kingdom. According to Reil, part of the motivation for starting the company was Russia's annexation of Crimea in 2014. The company pledges to only sell to democratic governments.

Cofounder Köhler's deep learning company called Hellsicht, founded in 2017, was folded into Helsing. In 2022, Helsing acquired Design AI, a company that specialises in reinforcement learning.

After Russian troops had begun the invasion of Ukraine since 24 February 2022, Helsing established partnerships with Rheinmetall in September 2022 and Saab in September 2023 to integrate Helsing's AI into their existing weapons systems, and continued to develop AI systems for Ukraine as the war carries on. The partnership with Rheinmetall fell through in 2024, the company instead partnered with Helsing's competitor, Auterion.

In 2024, Helsing secured a contract to build AI infrastructure for the Future Combat Air System. Also that year, the company partnered with Airbus to develop Wingman's AI system. Their AI has been integrated into the Eurofighter Typhoon EK's onboard system. The radar system of Saab JAS 39 Gripen was also upgraded with Helsing's software. In May and June 2025, the companies together conducted a combat trial known as "Project Beyond," testing Helsing's AI agent, Centaur, in a real-world dogfight scenario. Considered the first publicly known instance of AI piloting a fully operational fighter jet, the trial involved a Gripen E in a beyond visual range combat scenario against a human-operated Gripen D. The outcome was inconclusive regarding performance superiority, though the company has claimed that in simulated dogfights, its AI fares better. Helsing has also partnered with the Bundeswehr to upgrade their existing military platforms, like armoured vehicles, by integrating its AI technologies.

At the 2025 AI Action Summit in Paris, Helsing announced a collaboration with Mistral AI to create what they call "vision-language-action" AI models for their defence platform enabling it to comprehend its surroundings, interact with drone operators, and make quicker decisions in complex situations. Additionally, it has partnered with French satellite infrastructure startup Loft Orbital to deploy Europe's first AI-powered multi-sensor satellite constellation for defence in order to aid border surveillance, troop movement tracking, and infrastructure protection.

The company established an incubator division called Area 9 in January 2025 to focus on "moonshot" projects. At the time, the group was working on an AI battlefield agent that could process real-time data from sources such as satellites, synthetic aperture radar, and reconnaissance drones to analyse and map battlefields.

In early 2025, while 4,000 Germany-funded HF-1 strike drones were being delivered to Ukraine, Helsing agreed to provide a further 6,000 HX-2 strike drones.

In April 2025, Bloomberg News reported that Helsing is under scrutiny following allegations of overpriced drones and glitchy software, with former employees, investors, and military experts raising concerns about the reliability of its technology and the integrity of its business practices. Reservations notwithstanding, Politico Europe reported in 2026 that the German government intends to award a €580 million contract for Helsing to develop a core software-and-test architecture for the Combat Fighter System Nucleus (CFSN).

Helsing agreed to acquire German light aircraft manufacturer Grob Aircraft from H3 Aerospace in June 2025, aiming to integrate its AI and software with Grob's manufacturing to develop AI-powered reconnaissance and combat aircraft. In September that year, Helsing and ARX Robotics formed a partnership to develop AI-based, networked reconnaissance and strike systems integrating drones and unmanned ground vehicles for use in European defence applications. The following month, Helsing announced its acquisition of Australian autonomous underwater vehicle developer Blue Ocean, seeking to integrate the company's hardware and manufacturing capabilities with its AI technology.

=== Funding ===
The company's initial funding of €100 million was led by Spotify founder Daniel Ek through his investment vehicle Prima Materia in November 2021. The news sparked outrage among some Spotify artists, who advocated boycotts and objected to the use of the service's streaming revenue to support military tech development. Helsing's second round of funding was led by General Catalyst, raising €209 million in September 2023. GC also led the third round with participation from Saab, Accel, Lightspeed, among others, raising €450 million, which valued Helsing at approximately €5 billion in July 2024. At the time, Prima Materia was the largest shareholder with around 17% interest, while GC and Saab held approximately 12% and 5%, respectively. Ek, who chairs the company, led a €600 million funding round through Prima Materia in June 2025, valuing Helsing at €12 billion and bringing its total capital raised to date to €1.37 billion. The news once again sparked a wave of artist boycotts against Spotify.

In July 2026, the company raised an additional $1.8 billion, with a valuation of $18 billion. Investors participating in this latest round of funding include JPMorgan Chase, Lightspeed Venture Partners, and Iconiq.

== Products ==
=== Aerial ===
Their loitering munition drones, HF-1 and HX-2, use AI and stored map data to navigate and target without the need for GPS. The reconnaissance-strike software integrated into the drones, called Altra, can combine data feeds from multiple drones to cover a wider area and identify targets, giving operators additional time to assess the situation and make more accurate decisions. Immune to conventional jammers, the HF-1 has been used by the Ukrainian government in its defence against the Russian invasion of Ukraine, which has further contracted Helsing to supply 4,000 of HX-2s in September 2024. The HX-2 drones are manufactured at Helsing's factory in southern Germany, while various Ukrainian manufacturers, including Terminal Autonomy, are building HF-1s for Ukraine. The HF-1s are a cheaper version of the drones, featuring plywood fuselages. The company plans to build similar factories across Europe. Helsing maintains secrecy around the locations of some of its production sites, remaining wary of sabotage linked to Russia.

The HX-2 drones feature a quadcopter design with four wings and rotors arranged in an X configuration with a top speed of 250 km/h (160 mph). The drone can be equipped with up to 5 kg (11 lb) of ammunition and has a range of 100 km (62 mi). A single drone pilot is required to control them using a specialised laptop equipped for military purposes. The company says advanced techniques including 3D printing allow for cheaper manufacturing costs of the drones.

The CA-1 Europa is an autonomous unmanned combat aerial vehicle (UCAV), unveiled by Helsing in September 2025 and under development at subsidiary Grob Aircraft's Tussenhausen factory. The UCAV weighs approximately 4 tonnes and is designed to achieve high subsonic speeds, with a length of approximately 11 m (36 ft) and a wingspan of 10 m (33 ft). It is capable of carrying up to 500 kg (1,100 lb) of weapons in its hold, with an estimated operational range of 1,400–1,800 kilometers. The aircraft comes with Centaur AI agent, which functions as an autonomous fighter jet pilot, and can operate either independently or as part of a swarm. The CA-1's first flight is targeted for 2027, with entry into service is aimed for 2029.

=== Underwater ===
In 2025, Helsing unveiled the SG-1 Fathom—an autonomous swarm-capable underwater drone designed for long-term maritime surveillance and protection of subsea infrastructure. Each drone can operate submerged for up to 90 days without resurfacing, offering a low-maintenance way to monitor underwater areas. The drone is powered by Helsing's AI system, Lura, which rapidly processes acoustic data to detect and classify ships and submarines, while emitting significantly less noise than sonar systems. The drone is 2 metres (6 ft 7 in) long, weighs 60 kg (130 lb), and is capable of reaching speeds of up to 2 knots and depths of up to 1,000 m (3,300 ft). They are able to glide by redistributing their internal weight instead of using propellers. The drones will be manufactured at a newly established facility in Plymouth as part of the Trinity House Agreement between Germany and the UK.

=== Software ===
Altra is a system that combines reconnaissance information from ISR drones, spotters and any other source of data for land combat. The information is treated in a ground station with high computing capacity. And it feeds back a highly precise situation of the battlefield, and provides targeting information for indirect fire (mortar, artillery, rocket launcher), weapon stations and strike drones. The HX-2 drone is integrated with the Altra system.

Cirra is an AI software for electronic warfare that is being integrated to the Eurofighter ECR. The algorithms assesses the threats in real time. It is also integrated to ground stations, and analyses the data gathered. It is working offline for operation security.

Centaur is a system training an AI fighter pilot with the aim to reach autonomous air combat. The system was successfully tested by the Gripen E from Saab in June 2025.
