= Kronshtadt Grom =

Russian UCAV under development

Grom
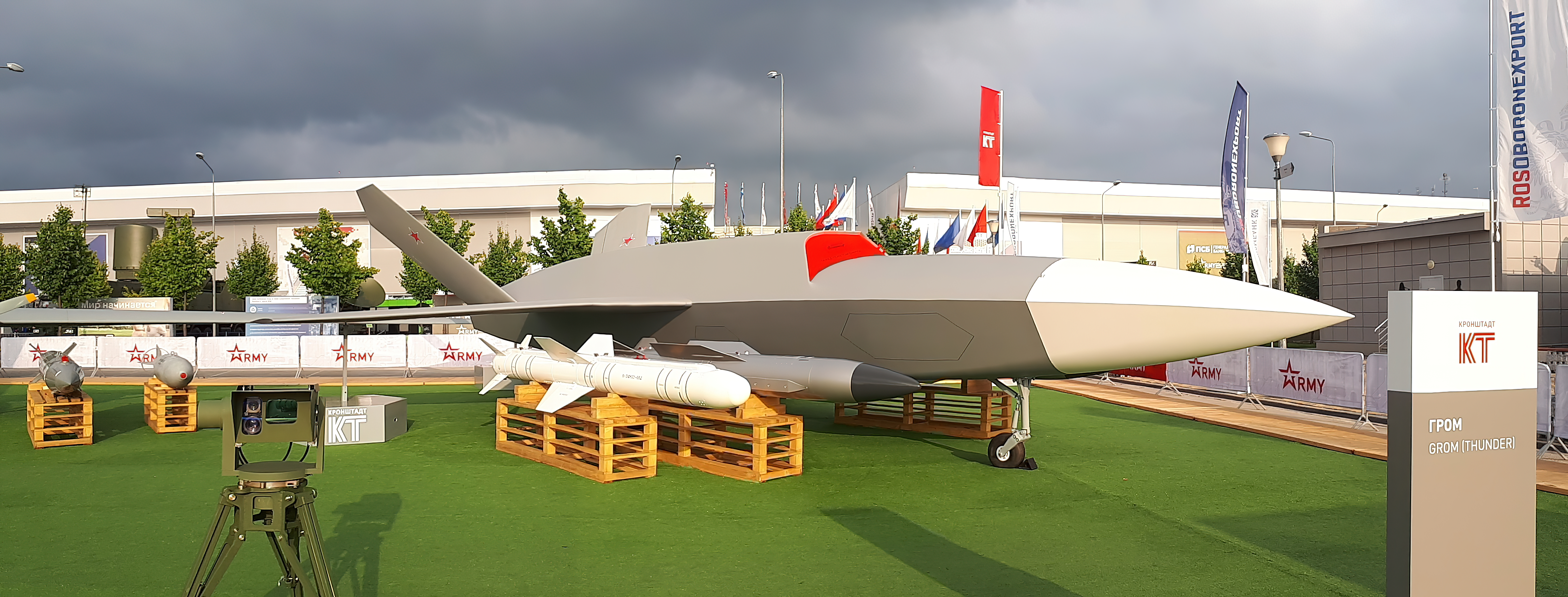
- Mockup at ARMY-2021 forum

General information
- Type: Unmanned combat aerial vehicle; Loyal wingman drone
- National origin: Russia
- Designer: Kronshtadt
- Status: In development
- Primary user: Russian Aerospace Forces

Grom (Russian: Гром, lit. 'Thunder') is a Russian loyal wingman drone being developed by the Kronshtadt Group. It was first unveiled at ARMY-2020 forum.

== Development ==
A full size mockup of the Grom UCAV was unveiled at Army-2020 by Kronshtadt.

"Grom" is being designed to operate in conjunction with fighters such as Su-35 and Su-57; according to main designer of Kronstadt, the main task of this UCAV is to save the lives of pilots and piloted aircraft themselves.

"Grom" will be able to carry Kh-38 air-to-surface guided missiles. The weapons will be placed on four hardpoints - two under the wings and two inside the fuselage. The Tactical Missiles Corporation has developed air-to-surface missiles for this drone, prepared the Izdeliye 85 guided missile, as well as KAB-250 and KAB-500 guided bombs. The Grom drone will be capable of not only operating with its own weapons, but also controlling a swarm of 10 units of Molniya strike drones launched from another carrier.

During Army-2022 forum Kronshtadt representatives confirmed that government contracts for the development of the drone were signed, and it was at the stage of preliminary design.

Durinhg the Army-2024 forum Kronshtadt presented an altered design of the Grom.

== Specifications (Grom) ==
Data from TASS, RG.ru

General characteristics

- Crew: None
- Length: 13.8 m (45 ft 3 in)
- Wingspan: 10 m (32 ft 10 in)
- Height: 3.8 m (12 ft 6 in)
- Empty weight: 7,000 kg (15,432 lb)

Performance

- Maximum speed: 1,000 km/h (620 mph, 540 kn)
- Cruise speed: 800 km/h (500 mph, 430 kn)
- Range: 800 km (500 mi, 430 nmi)
- Service ceiling: 12,000 m (39,000 ft)

Armament

- 4 hardpoints: 2 under the wings and 2 inside the weapons bay for up to 1,3 tonnes of armaments.
- Missiles
  - Air-to-surface missiles
    - Kh-38
- Bombs
  - KAB-250
  - KAB-500
