= Spirit Mosquito =

British unmanned combat aerial vehicle

Mosquito
- 2020 concept

General information
- Type: Unmanned combat aerial vehicle (UCAV)
- National origin: United Kingdom
- Manufacturer: Spirit AeroSystems Belfast
- Status: Cancelled

The Spirit Mosquito was an unmanned combat aerial vehicle (UCAV) technology demonstrator in development by Team Mosquito in the United Kingdom. In January 2021, the aircraft was chosen as a technology demonstrator for the Royal Air Force's Lightweight Affordable Novel Combat Aircraft (LANCA) concept which was first conceptualised in 2015 by the RAF Rapid Capabilities Office.

The aircraft was designed to operate alongside manned fighter aircraft, including the Eurofighter Typhoon, Lockheed Martin F-35 Lightning II and BAE Systems Tempest, with a range of weapons and sensors to offer them increased protection, survivability and information. Spirit AeroSystems, which is based in Belfast, Northern Ireland, was the aircraft's prime contractor and full-scale flight trials were planned for 2023.

On 24 June 2022, the UK Ministry of Defence announced the cancellation of Project Mosquito, explaining that there were more beneficial capability and cost-effectiveness in smaller "additive capabilities" instead.

== Design and development ==
In 2015, the RAF Rapid Capabilities Office began working on concepts for a "loyal wingman" UCAV, named the Lightweight Affordable Novel Combat Aircraft (LANCA), under the Future Combat Air System Technology Initiative (FCAS TI). LANCA was managed by, and was the technical authority of, the Ministry of Defence's Defence Science and Technology Laboratory (Dstl). In 2019, the MOD awarded contracts to three teams to provide designs for a flight demonstrator; Boeing Defence UK, Team Avenger (led by Blue Bear Systems Research) and Team Blackdawn (later Team Mosquito) (Bombardier Belfast (now Spirit AeroSystems), Callen-Lenz and Northrop Grumman UK).

In January 2021, a £30 million contract was awarded to Team Mosquito to design and manufacture a technology demonstrator. The team was led by Spirit AeroSystems Belfast and also included Northrop Grumman UK and Intrepid Minds. Whilst it was previously part of the team, Callen-Lenz was not included in the MOD press release and so may have become uninvolved with the project. To reduce costs and timelines, new software development techniques were to be utilized alongside civilian aerospace engineering and management expertise. These techniques would have been used to achieve full-scale flight trials by the end of 2023. If the technology demonstration was successful, a decision would then have been taken on whether to launch a follow-on programme for a production version. Whilst an in-service date for a production aircraft had never officially been announced, the MOD press release stated that the aircraft may have operated alongside the RAF's Eurofighter Typhoons, which have a planned out of service date between the 2030s and 2040s, and later, its BAE Systems Tempest, which will enter service in the 2030s.

The MOD contract announcement disclosed few design specifics but revealed the aircraft was an unmanned combat aerial vehicle (UCAV) designed to offer increased protection, survivability and information to manned aircraft when operating alongside them. It was set to be the UK's first unmanned platform able to "target and shoot down" enemy aircraft while surviving against surface-to-air missiles. Concept images included with the contract announcement showed an aircraft with low-observable features; a streamlined fuselage, swept wings, dropped wingtips, a V-tail, a dorsal air intake and a fuselage chine line — however this may not have been the aircraft's final design.

On 24 June 2022, the MOD announced that Project Mosquito would not proceed beyond the design phase due to more beneficial and cost-effective "additive capabilities" being available.

== See also ==
Aircraft of comparable role, configuration, and era

- Boeing MQ-28 Ghost Bat
- Kratos XQ-58 Valkyrie
- HAL CATS Warrior
- Project Vixen
