= Boeing MQ-28 Ghost Bat =

Australian UCAV in development

MQ-28 Ghost Bat
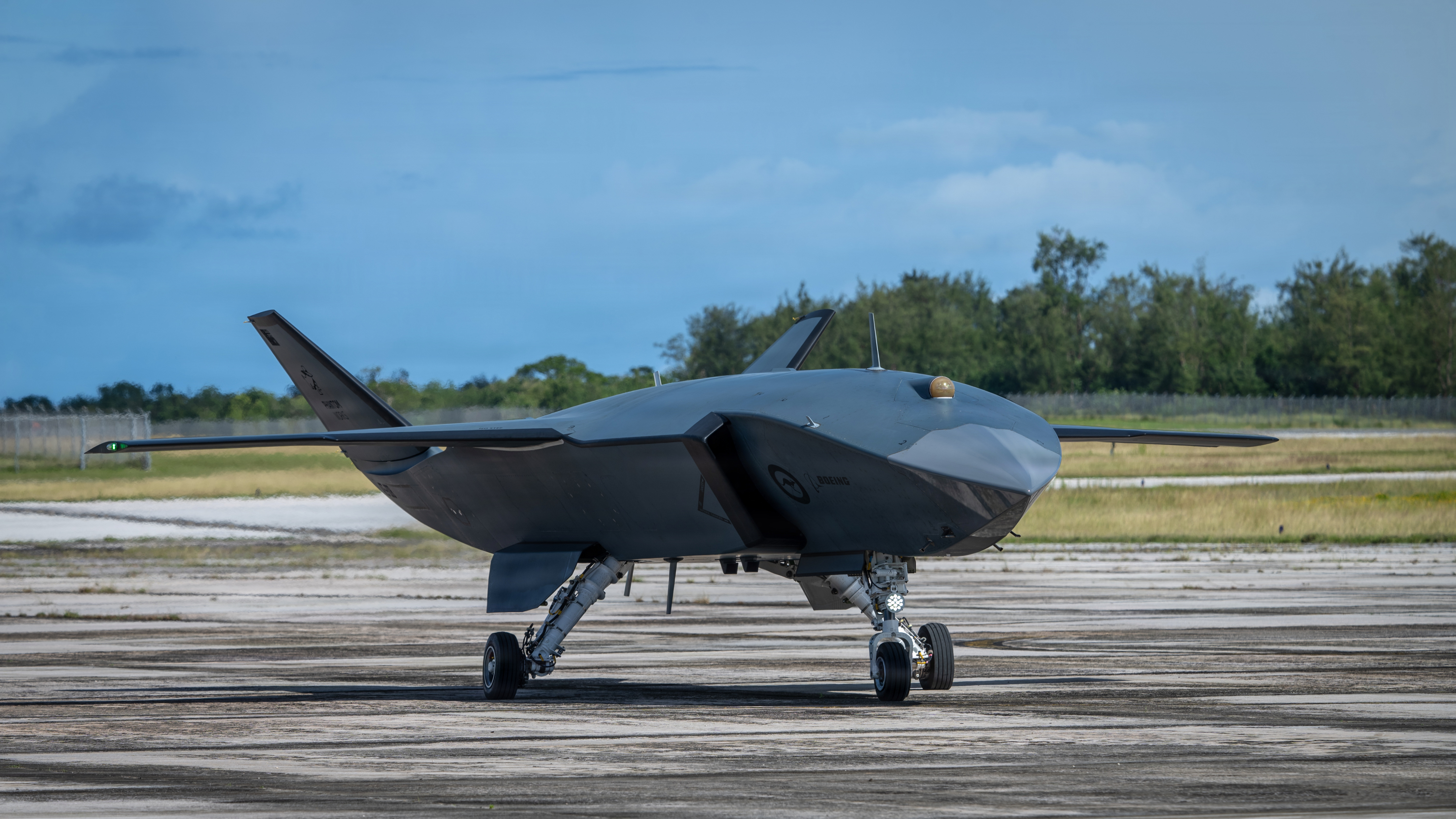
- A MQ-28 Ghost Bat during the Valiant Shield 2026 exercise

General information
- Type: Unmanned combat aerial vehicle; Loyal wingman drone
- National origin: Australia
- Manufacturer: Boeing Australia; Boeing Defense, Space & Security
- Status: Block 1 aircraft: in flight testing Block 2 aircraft: flight testing and production Block 3 aircraft: under development
- Primary user: Royal Australian Air Force
- Prototypes: 8 Block 1; 9 Block 2

History
- Manufactured: 2019–present
- Introduction date: 2028 (planned)
- First flight: 27 February 2021

The Boeing MQ-28 Ghost Bat, previously known as the Boeing Airpower Teaming System (ATS), is a stealth, multirole, unmanned combat aerial vehicle under development by Boeing Australia for the Royal Australian Air Force (RAAF). It is designed as a force multiplier aircraft capable of flying alongside crewed aircraft for support as part of an integrated system (loyal wingman) including space-based capabilities, and performing autonomous missions independently using artificial intelligence.

As of October 2024, eight Block 1 vehicles have been built with more than 100 hours of flight testing. Operational tests have taken place at Australia's RAAF Woomera Test Range Complex approximately one out of every three months, with the aircraft flying one to three sorties daily, including some flights at night. The aircraft has also been operated from RAAF Base Tindal demonstrating the ability to be deployed from a Boeing C-17 Globemaster III and also be controlled by an airborne Boeing E-7 Wedgetail. Three additional Block 2 airframes featuring an improved wing and GPS/INS are to be produced by 2025. In December 2025, it was announced that a further six Block 2 airframes would be produced and that development would start on an enhanced Block 3 prototype.

As of 2025, the aircraft are designed and built in Melbourne at Boeing Australia with future production planned in Wellcamp, Toowoomba. The wing is Boeing's largest resin-infused single composite component, featuring electromechanical actuators and controllers for the primary flight control system, and the aircraft has a modular, swappable mission nose package system.

== Development ==
The aircraft is the first combat aircraft designed and developed in Australia in over half a century. In February 2019, Boeing said that it will "depend on the market" whether the aircraft is manufactured in Australia or the US. Ghost Bat is to remain a sovereign Australian program, with aircraft only being produced in Australia and the lead partner on the program being the RAAF. On 4 November 2021, Boeing Australia announced the Melbourne facility, Boeing Australia, had already commenced construction of its fifth aircraft. On 26 March 2024, Boeing Australia announced the commencement of construction of a 9000 square-metre factory complex, named the Wellcamp Aerospace and Defence Precinct, in Wellcamp, Toowoomba, in partnership with the Wagners. While earthworks begin, Wagner Corporation is continuing to work with Boeing Australia to finalise the production facility design and architectural features. This facility had initially been announced on 21 September 2021 by the Queensland Premier to support construction of the Ghost Bat.

In the official naming ceremony held at RAAF Base Amberley on 21 March 2022, it was announced the Loyal Wingman will be named the MQ-28A Ghost Bat in RAAF service, named after an Australian bat found in northern parts of the Australian continent. The ghost bat is an Australian native mammal known for teaming together in a pack to detect and hunt, which reflects the unique characteristics of the aircraft's sensors and intelligence, surveillance and reconnaissance abilities.

The RAAF initially planned to buy three Airpower Teaming System (ATS) systems, as part of the Loyal Wingman Advanced Development Program (LWADP). These three drones were built at an automated production line in Melbourne, Victoria. The order was increased to six with an A$115 million contract days after the first flight. As of 9 May 2023, the Australian government confirmed its commitment to funding 10 aircraft for the RAAF, not including three prototypes that will not be owned by the government or operated by the RAAF. This takes the government's total investment in the Loyal Wingman program to over A$600 million. The uncrewed platforms are scheduled to enter service with the RAAF in 2024–25.

In February 2024, the Australian Government announced a further A$400 million in funding for three more aircraft, built to the new "Block 2" standard. The announced improvements included developments to the wing, GPS, sensors, mission payloads, integrated combat system and the autonomous systems.

=== Testing and other possible uses ===
Boeing MQ-28 Ghost Bat at the 2023 Avalon Airshow

A full-scale mock-up was revealed at the 2019 Avalon Airshow. The first prototype aircraft achieved a power-on of its systems in March 2020, and was rolled out in May 2020 by Boeing Australia with the release of images showing a detailed prototype of the aircraft and a video to illustrate the drone's operational abilities. In May 2022, Australian Prime Minister Scott Morrison reflected "This is a truly historic moment for our country and for Australian defence innovation. The Loyal Wingman is to be pivotal to exploring the critical capabilities our Air Force needs to protect our nation and its allies into the future."

Boeing announced it powered up the engine of its first Airpower Teaming System (ATS) uncrewed aircraft for the first time in September 2020. The engine test was part of ground testing to prepare for its first flight before the end of 2020.

The Boeing Airpower Teaming System (ATS) prototype moved under its own power for the first time in October 2020, conducting low-speed taxi tests at RAAF Base Amberley. The Boeing Airpower Teaming System later performed a high-speed taxi test at an unnamed remote location in December 2020.

The first test flight of the prototype occurred at RAAF Base Woomera on 27 February 2021. Two more test flights occurred at RAAF Woomera Range Complex in early November 2021 where a prototype successfully raised and engaged its landing gear while a second prototype completed its first test flight.

In August 2022, it was revealed by United States Secretary of the Air Force Frank Kendall that preliminary discussions were being held about purchasing the MQ-28 for US service. The 2023 Defence budget revealed that a Combat Collaborative Aircraft Project Arrangement for greater collaboration on the MQ-28 had been signed with the US in line with the recommendations made in the Defence Strategic Review.

In July 2024, after a visit to the Ghost Bat facility in Melbourne, the Australian Assistant Minister for Defence clarified that there is an option to arm the UAV in the future in addition to its reconnaissance and surveillance roles.

On 13 June 2024, the first Royal Australian Air Force (RAAF) remote systems pilot WGCDR (Wing Commander) Phil Parsons completed Boeing's training, becoming the first non-Boeing pilot on the program. The first USN MQ-28 “pilot” was graduated in 2024 as well. During a typical mission, a launch and recovery operator would oversee the aircraft as it takes flight, then it would be handed off to a crewed aircraft, such as an E-7A, F-35A or F/A-18F, whose crew tasks it to perform, for example, an intelligence, surveillance and reconnaissance mission.

As of October 2024, eight prototype Block 1 vehicles have been built with more than 100 hours of flight testing. Operational tests have taken place at Australia's RAAF Woomera Range Complex approximately one out of every three months, with the aircraft flying one to three sorties daily, including some flights at night. The eight Block 1 vehicles are viewed by Boeing as 'developmental test assets' which are to be retired as three Block 2 'operational test assets' are to be produced by 2025. By the end of September 2025, Boeing aims to conduct a demonstration of an operational CCA capability such as the MQ-28 teamed up with in-service RAAF types.

On 26 March 2025, Boeing announced at the Avalon Airshow that the MQ-28 had completed its 100th test flight and that they were intending to conduct test launches of air-to-air missiles launched from the MQ-28 "by the end of 2025 or early 2026".

In September 2025, it was confirmed the program was ahead of schedule, and the government was expecting foreign orders.

=== Live fire testing ===
On 8 December 2025, the MQ-28As first live firing occurred when an AIM-120 AMRAAM missile destroyed a Phoenix target drone. The MQ-28A was acting as a loyal wingman to a RAAF E-7 Wedgetail and to a F/A-18F Super Hornet. It was reportedly, according to The War Zone, the first time an unmanned aircraft had fired an AIM-120 AMRAAM.

The three aircraft participating in the engagement took off from different locations, with the MQ-28 being overseen by an operator aboard the E-7. The MQ-28 and the Super Hornet flew in combat formation during the engagement. Data was shared between the three aircraft, with the Super Hornet identifying and tracking the target drone. The MQ-28 adjusted its course accordingly and was sent authorization from the E-7 to engage the target at an “operationally representative range”. After firing, the MQ-28 provided the AMRAAM with mid-course guidance. According to Colin Miller, General Manager of Boeing Phantom Works, only four major commands were issued by the operator during the test engagement: taking off; performing a combat air patrol; committing to target interception; and giving clearance for the MQ-28 to arm and fire the missile.

The test made the MQ-28 the second unmanned combat aerial vehicle in the world, after the Bayraktar Kızılelma, to successfully destroy an aerial target using a beyond-visual-range air-to-air missile.

=== Future procurement ===
On 9 December 2025, the Australian government announced that it would invest a further approximately A$1.4 billion into the program and that it had signed contracts for a further six Block 2 operational aircraft and for the development of an enhanced Block 3 prototype.

The United States Air Force, United States Navy, Royal Air Force, Royal Navy and German Army (Bundeswehr) are possible operators. Japan has also shown interest in the Ghost Bat in April 2026 with a collaborative combat aircraft (CCA) signed with Boeing planning to offer the MQ-28 to Japan in September 2026.

== Design ==
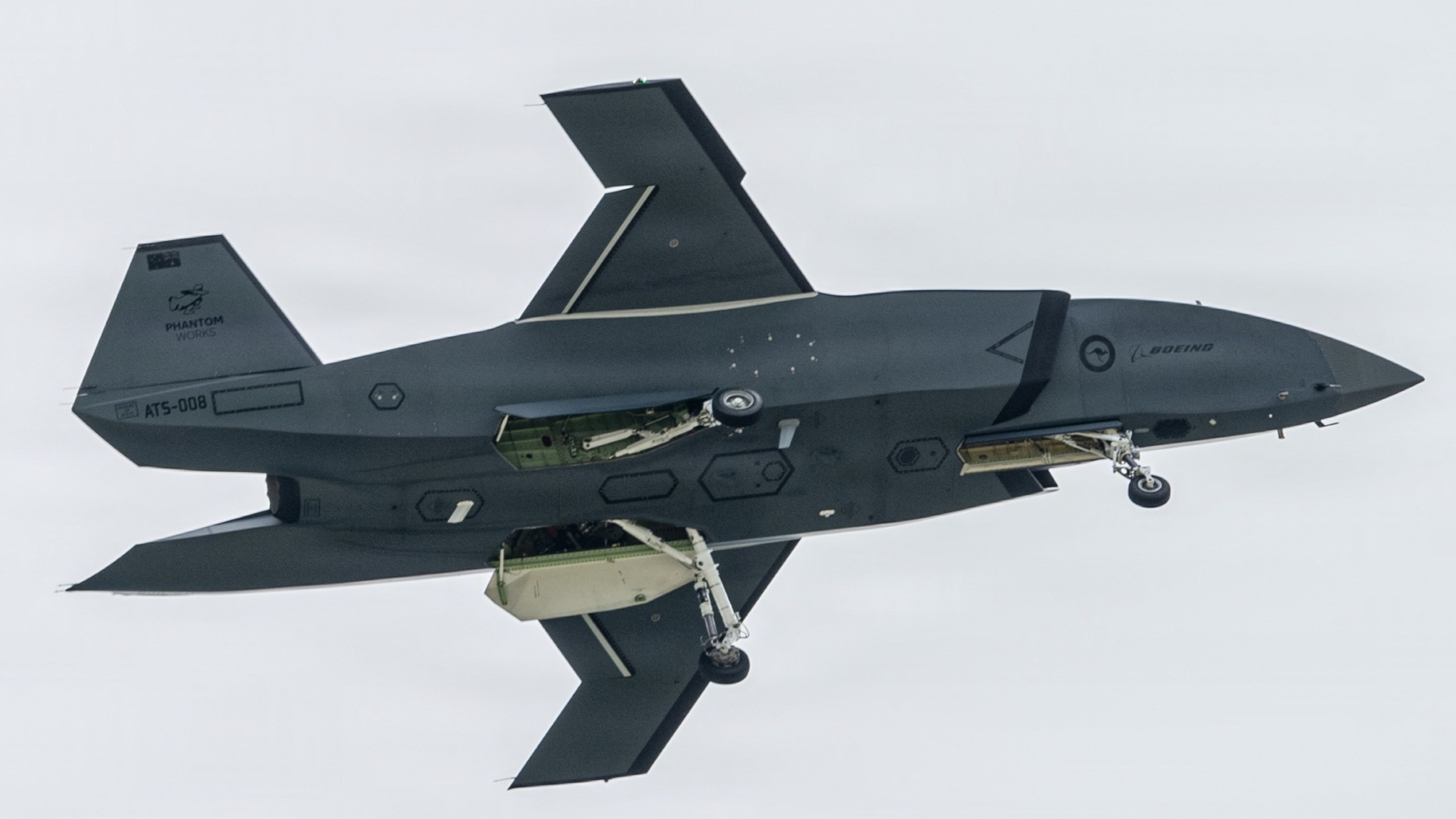
A MQ-28 performing a flyover in 2026

The Ghost Bat is an unmanned combat aerial vehicle (UCAV) incorporating artificial intelligence and utilising a modular mission package system in the nose of the aircraft. The entire nose section can be removed and quickly swapped for another with a different payload for various missions including combat, force reconnaissance, and electronic warfare. Developed under Air Force Minor Program DEF 6014, one role will be to use the Manned-Unmanned Teaming (MUM-T) concept to support and protect manned Royal Australian Air Force (RAAF) aircraft, such as the F-35A, F/A-18F, E-7A, and KC-30A while they conduct operations.

The UAV is designed to act as a "loyal wingman" that is controlled by a parent aircraft to accomplish tasks such as scouting or absorbing enemy fire if attacked, as well as operating independently. It has a range of more than 2,000 nautical miles (3,700 km; 2,300 mi). The UAV's jet engine allows it to fly in the high subsonic flight regime and keep up with manned fighters. Boeing has said it has 'fighter-like' maneuverability. The MQ-28A prototype did not use any radiation-absorbent material (RAM) coating and instead relied on its shape to reduce its radar cross section (RCS). The aircraft wing is Boeing's largest resin-infused single composite component, leveraging technology from the trailing edge of Boeing 787 wings developed at Boeing Australia. Three key manufacturing innovations were incorporated in the areas of robotic drill and fill, shim-less assembly, and full-size determinant assembly.

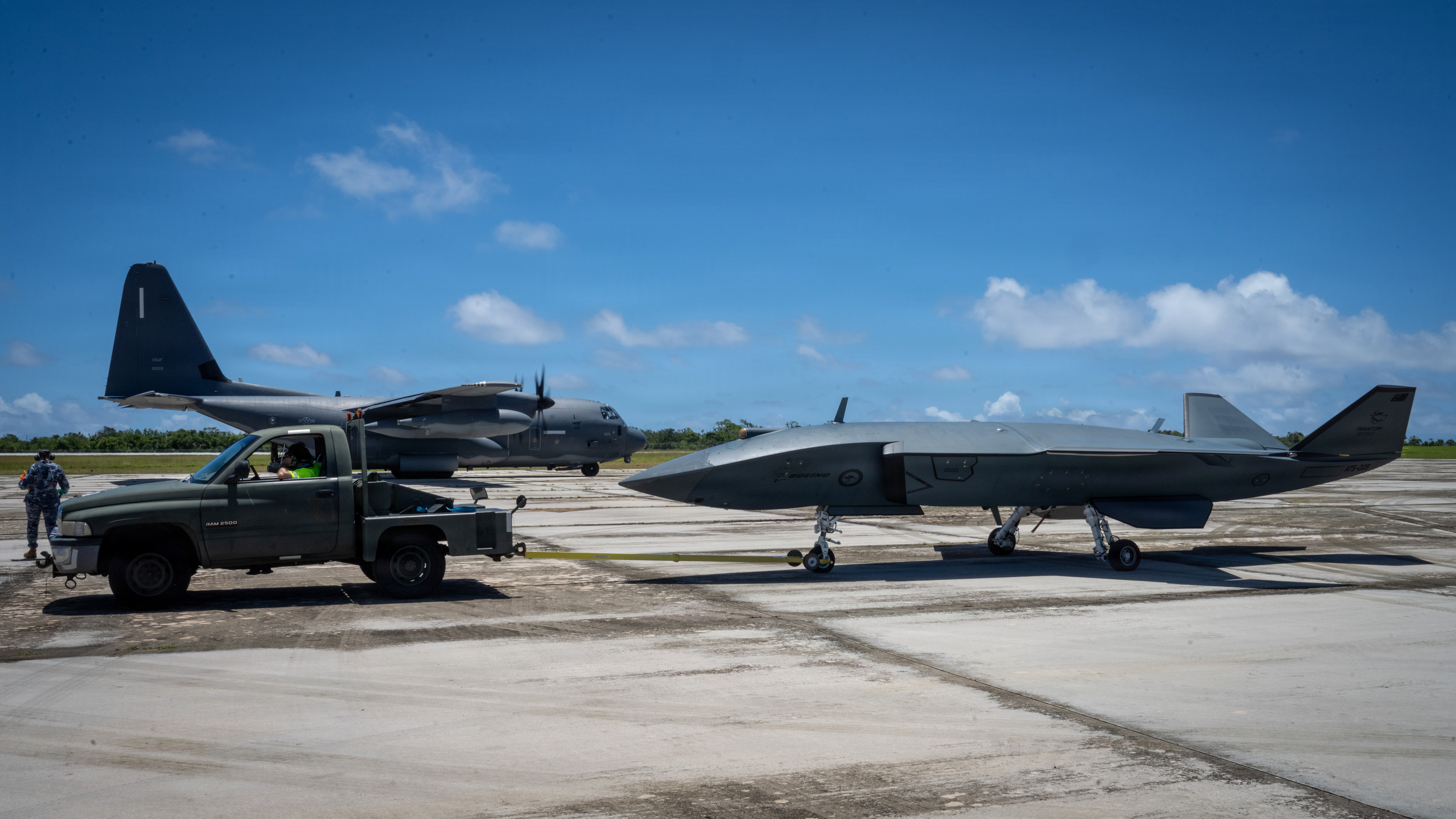
A MQ-28 being towed behind a vehicle in 2026

BAE Systems Australia supplies the uncrewed flight vehicle management solution and simulation capability, flight control computers and navigation equipment. Saab AB supplies communications systems, avionics, as well as electromechanical actuators and controllers for the MQ-28's primary flight control system. The engine is a single commercial-off-the-shelf turbofan engine and is a Williams FJ44. Defence Science and Technology Group contributed a range of specialist high-technology advice and testing including aerodynamic data from testing in both the low-speed and transonic wind tunnels at DSTG Fishermans Bend, ground vibration testing, nose wheel shimmy, mission planning software, and characterisation and selection of the vehicle's airframe coatings.

The Block 2 will not have major airframe changes from the Block 1. The main external change will be the removal of the Block 1's dogtooth wing. Internally, the aircraft is to receive wiring modifications and other changes that are to improve maintainability. Block 2 is to also get a new global positioning system (GPS)/inertial navigation system to replace the Block 1's commercially available GPS.

In June 2026, Boeing Australia announced at the ILA Berlin Air Show that the Block 3 airframe would start construction in 2027. The airframe will have a 25% larger wing and will be able to be armed internally with either two AIM-120 AMRAAM missiles or four GBU-39 Small Diameter Bombs, and will have three external hardpoints, beyond-line-of-sight communications, an enlarged nose mission-segment, and an increased take-off weight of 2,000 pounds (910 kg).

== Operators ==
Australia

- Royal Australian Air Force: Boeing MQ-28 Ghost Bat to achieve operational capability with the Royal Australian Air Force in 2028.

== Specifications ==
Data from Air International

General characteristics

- Crew: None
- Length: 11.7 m (38 ft 5 in)
- Wingspan: 7.3 m (23 ft 11 in)
- Powerplant: 1 × Williams FJ44

Performance

- Maximum speed: 1,080 km/h (670 mph, 580 kn)
- Maximum speed: Mach 0.9
- Range: 3,700 km (2,300 mi, 2,000 nmi)

== See also ==
- Ghost Shark (submarine), Australian autonomous underwater vehicle by Anduril Industries

Aircraft of comparable role, configuration, and era

- AVIC Dark Sword
- BAE Taranis
- Baykar Bayraktar Kızılelma
- Boeing MQ-25 Stingray
- Dassault nEUROn
- General Atomics MQ-20 Avenger
- HAL CATS Warrior
- Kratos XQ-58 Valkyrie
- Sukhoi S-70 Okhotnik-B
- TAI Anka-3
- DRDO Ghatak

Related lists

- List of stealth aircraft
