= General Atomics Mojave =

Unmanned combat aerial vehicle

Mojave Grey Eagle
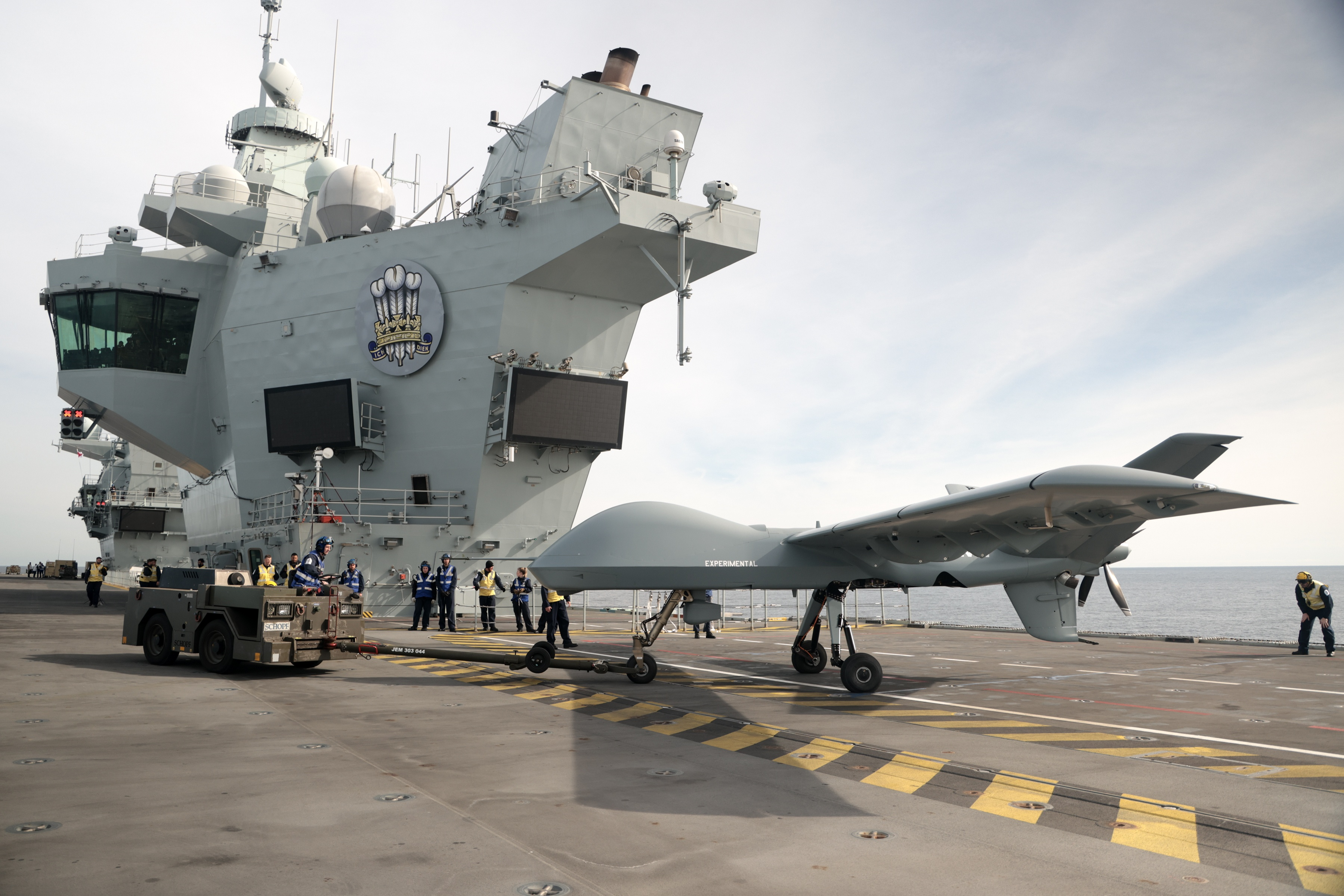
- A Mojave onboard HMS Prince of Wales

General information
- Type: Unmanned combat aerial vehicle
- National origin: United States
- Manufacturer: General Atomics Aeronautical Systems
- Status: In development
- Number built: 1

History
- First flight: Summer 2021
- Developed from: General Atomics MQ-9 Reaper; General Atomics MQ-1C Gray Eagle

The General Atomics Mojave (known in exports as the Grey Eagle) is an unmanned aerial vehicle (UAV) capable of short takeoff and landing (STOL), being developed by General Atomics Aeronautical Systems. First unveiled on December 9, 2021, General Atomics states that it is to fulfill the roles of reconnaissance, close air support, and armed overwatch.

== Design and development ==
Development on the Mojave began around 2018 or 2019. The initial objective was to create a drone that could perform vertical takeoff and landing (VTOL), but this was determined to be impractical as significant compromises in payload or endurance would need to be taken. Instead, development shifted to a STOL design that would preserve performance while needing less runway space. It features a configuration similar to that of the MQ-9 Reaper, with a low-mounted wing, bulbous nose, and Y-tail. The engine, a Rolls-Royce M250 turboprop, is mounted in a pusher configuration. Two main things that set this aircraft apart from the rest of the Predator family are its wings and landing gear. The wings are enlarged, featuring "high-lift devices" including leading edge slats, double-slotted flaps and drooping ailerons. The landing gear is also more reinforced when compared to other UAVs, featuring wide bushwheel-style tires, used to assist on landing in rough terrain, and thick shock absorbers as well as more pronounced torque links. A key design feature of the Mojave is its transportability; it can be broken down and transported via a C-130 Hercules or similarly-sized aircraft. It can then be ready for a mission in around 1.5 hours with a four-person team.

The Mojave completed its first test flight in summer of 2021, and was formally unveiled by GA on December 9, 2021. It is being developed to fulfill the role of an unmanned combat aerial vehicle that can operate from more rugged terrain with a combat loadout, while also offering the option to be outfitted with various electronic systems to assist ground troops. Some of these roles include signal intelligence (SIGINT) and moving target indication, as well as use of synthetic-aperture radar and electro-optical sensors. It can take off from austere runways as little as 152 m (500 ft) in length. In a surveillance mode it can take off from a 300 m (1,000 ft) runway and stay aloft for over 20 hours, and it can perform armed ISR taking off from a 488 m (1,600 ft) runway carrying 12 Hellfire missiles with nine hours maximum endurance. The longest the Mojave can fly is for 27 hours when taking off from a long runway with a full fuel load and no other payload, or it carry a full 1,600 kg (3,600 lb) payload totaling 16 Hellfire missiles. In addition to guided munitions, M134D-H miniguns can be mounted on the wings to perform strafing runs. The STOL capabilities of the Mojave have further lead to the proposition of it being used as a carrier aircraft for naval operations.

The Mojave is planned to be controlled using General Atomics' Scalable Command and Control (SC2) System, which is currently being developed for use on the MQ-1C Gray Eagle Extended Range (GE-ER), and likely will be able to operate from already-established General Atomics ground stations, such as the Certifiable Ground Control Station (CGCS) or Block 30 Ground Control Station. Use of the SC2 System will allow the operator to perform pre-flight, taxiing, take-off, and landing operations on-site by a pilot.

=== MQ-9B STOL ===
Mojave is being used to demonstrate uncrewed STOL capabilities for the upcoming MQ-9B STOL, a wing-kit that allows the MQ-9B, which has a greater payload and endurance than the Mojave, to operate from austere runways and aircraft carriers.

== Operational history ==
In May 2023, the United Kingdom announced it would be acquiring a Mojave system for seven months of trials aboard its Queen Elizabeth-class aircraft carriers. In November 2023, during the WESTLANT 23 deployment to the United States, a single Mojave and its associated control station were embarked aboard HMS Prince of Wales. The demonstration occurred on the 15th November and was witnessed by representatives from the US, Spain, Italy, Australia, and Japan. The demonstration saw the aircraft execute a take-off from an improvised angle rather than the standard centreline of the carrier and did not utilize the carrier's ski-jump, it then completed a number of circuits and approaches before landing back on the deck un-arrested. Beyond being the first time Mojave has performed a trial from a carrier, this also marked the first time an uncrewed system of this weight class had operated from an aircraft carrier outside the United States.

On 13 April 2024, General Atomics conducted live fire tests with DAP-6 minigun pods, destroying several ground targets, including a pickup truck, and expending over 10,000 rounds of ammunition. GA-ASI partnered with Dillon Aero to fit DAP-6 minigun pods to the Mojave. This was the first time guns were used on a General Atomics UAS.

On 12 November 2024, Gray Eagle STOL UAV, which is the name of the mass-produced version of the Mojave, performed a take-off test on ROKS Dokdo, an amphibious assault ship of the Republic of Korea Navy. The UAV took off from Dokdo, flew twice close to her port side to perform a "simulated landing procedure", but did not land on the ship. It then headed to the Naval Air Command in Pohang and landed on the runway there.

== Specifications ==
Data from General Atomics Aeronautical Systems Inc. Data Sheet

General characteristics

- Crew: 0 onboard, 2 at the ground station
- Length: 29 ft 6 in (9 m)
- Wingspan: 52 ft 6 in (16 m)
- Max takeoff weight: 7,000 lb (3,175 kg)
- Fuel capacity: 3,550 lbs
- Powerplant: 1 × Rolls-Royce M250 turboprop, 450 shp (340 kW)

Performance

- Ferry range: 2,900 mi (4,600 km, 2,500 nmi)
- Endurance: 25+ hours

Armament

- 7 hardpoints
  - Up to 650 lb (290 kg) on each of the 4 inboard hardpoints
  - Up to 350 lb (160 kg) on each of the 2 outboard hardpoints
  - Up to 500 lb (230 kg) on the center hardpoint
- Provisions to carry combinations of:
  - M134D-H Minigun (DAP-6 gun pods)
  - Up to 16 AGM-114 Hellfire air-to-surface missiles
  - Likely up to 16 AGM-179 JAGM air-to-surface missiles

== See also ==
Related development

- General Atomics MQ-1 Predator
- General Atomics MQ-1C Gray Eagle
- General Atomics MQ-9 Reaper
- General Atomics MQ-20 Avenger (formerly Predator C)

Aircraft of comparable role, configuration, and era

- Baykar Bayraktar TB3

Related lists

- List of unmanned aerial vehicles
- List of STOL aircraft
