= Gjadër Aerodrome =

Air base in Albania

Gjadër Air Base Lezhë-Zadrima Air Base
- Gjadër, Lezhë County, Albania

Site information
- Type: Military: Air Force Base
- Owner: Albanian Ministry of Defence
- Operator: Albanian Air Force

Location
- Location of Kuçovë Airport in Albania Gjadër Air Base (LAGJ) (Europe)
- Coordinates: 41°53′42.6″N 19°35′54.7″E

Airfield information
- Identifiers: ICAO: LAGJ
- Elevation: 7 meters (23 ft) AMSL
Runways
Direction	Length and surface
16/34	2,800 meters (9,200 ft) Concrete
17/35	2,202 meters (7,224 ft) Concrete

Gjadër Air Base (ICAO: LAGJ) is a military airport located in Gjadër, Lezhë County, Albania. It is north of the city of Lezhë and is also known as Lezhë-Zadrima Air Base.

The Gjadër Airbase in Albania was built near a mountain to allow aircraft after landing to go into the underground hangar. The tunnels have a capacity of storing about 50 aircraft plus personnel. As the airfield is located in the side of the mountain, the pilots have to be careful not to turn when taking off as they can crash into the sides of the mountain.

== Early operations ==
The airfield was built to minimise the threat from the Yugoslav Air Force entering Albanian airspace. To counter any Yugoslavian aircraft, the most modern aircraft, the F-7A was based here. Construction of the base began in 1969, but because of its complexity it wasn't finished until the mid-1970s. The first aircraft to use its runway landed on 10 July 1973, and the official opening was held on 15 March 1974. Regiment 5646 was established here with one squadron of F-6s, but in May 1976 six FT-5s arrived here and also the F-7A squadron from Rinas. On 16 October 1976, a second F-6 squadron moved to the base from Kuçovë. The home unit was later redesignated 4010 Regt. The base was in use until at least 1992 when on 9 September an FT-5 of the Albanian Air Force nearly crashed on Gjadër. The aircraft, piloted by Ismet Zervoi and Martin Bregu, was successfully belly-landed on the grass next to the runway without much damage.

== CIA operations ==
From February to April 1994, the base was in use by the CIA to fly unmanned spy missions over Bosnia and Herzegovina and the Federal Republic of Yugoslavia, using two Gnat-750 pilotless drones and a ground satellite transmitting station. Because one of the original two CIA Gnats crashed during testing in the U.S., one of the two operational Gnats was leased. The operation was not a success. The Gnat-750 suffered from a number of bugs concerning the data link and was limited in use by bad weather. The team was finally withdrawn. The Gnat-750 lacked a satellite uplink antenna and so was used in conjunction with a Schweizer RG-8 powered glider as the flying data relay substitute. The RG-8 has an 8-hour flight time, 6 of each 8 hours was spent getting to and from the relay orbit sight. While the Gnat-750 has a 24- to 30-hour endurance, the manned relay aircraft greatly limits the overall effectiveness of the system. The RG-8 was previously used by the USCG. The two Gnats were then refitted with a thermal imaging sensor and an improved SIGINT package and redeployed to Croatia in 1994, achieving a significantly more effective performance. The CIA's activities with the Gnat-750 were eventually given the code name Lofty View. In 1994, 10 initial flights were conducted, which can be marked as a failure. By the summer of 1994, the operation had conducted 30 flights of which 12 were viewed as successful.

== US military operations ==
From April to November 1995 the Gjadër base hosted Predator UAV systems operated by the US Army's Charlie Company Military Intelligence Battalion (Low Intensity), to monitor the conflict in Bosnia and Herzegovina. Four disassembled Predators were flown into Gjadër airbase in a C-130 Hercules. The UAVs were assembled and flown first by civilian contract personnel. More than 70 U.S. military personnel of the military intelligence were deployed. Intelligence collection missions began in July 1995. One of the Predators was lost over Bosnia on 11 August 1995; a second was deliberately destroyed on 14 August after suffering an engine failure over Bosnia, which may have been caused by hostile ground fire. Its original 60-day stay under the codename Operation Nomad Vigil was extended to 120 days. The following spring, in March 1996, the system was redeployed to the Balkan area and operated out of Taszar, Hungary.

== Aftermath ==
On 12 March 1997, the base was stormed by local people during a national revolt against the Albanian government. Several buildings, including the control tower, were destroyed. On 16 March, soldiers abandoned the air base. Lack of funds prevented the base from being repaired, and flying operations ceased in 2000. It is now used as a storage facility for fighter aircraft withdrawn from service. No Albanian air force aircraft are permanently based there.

== Tunnels ==
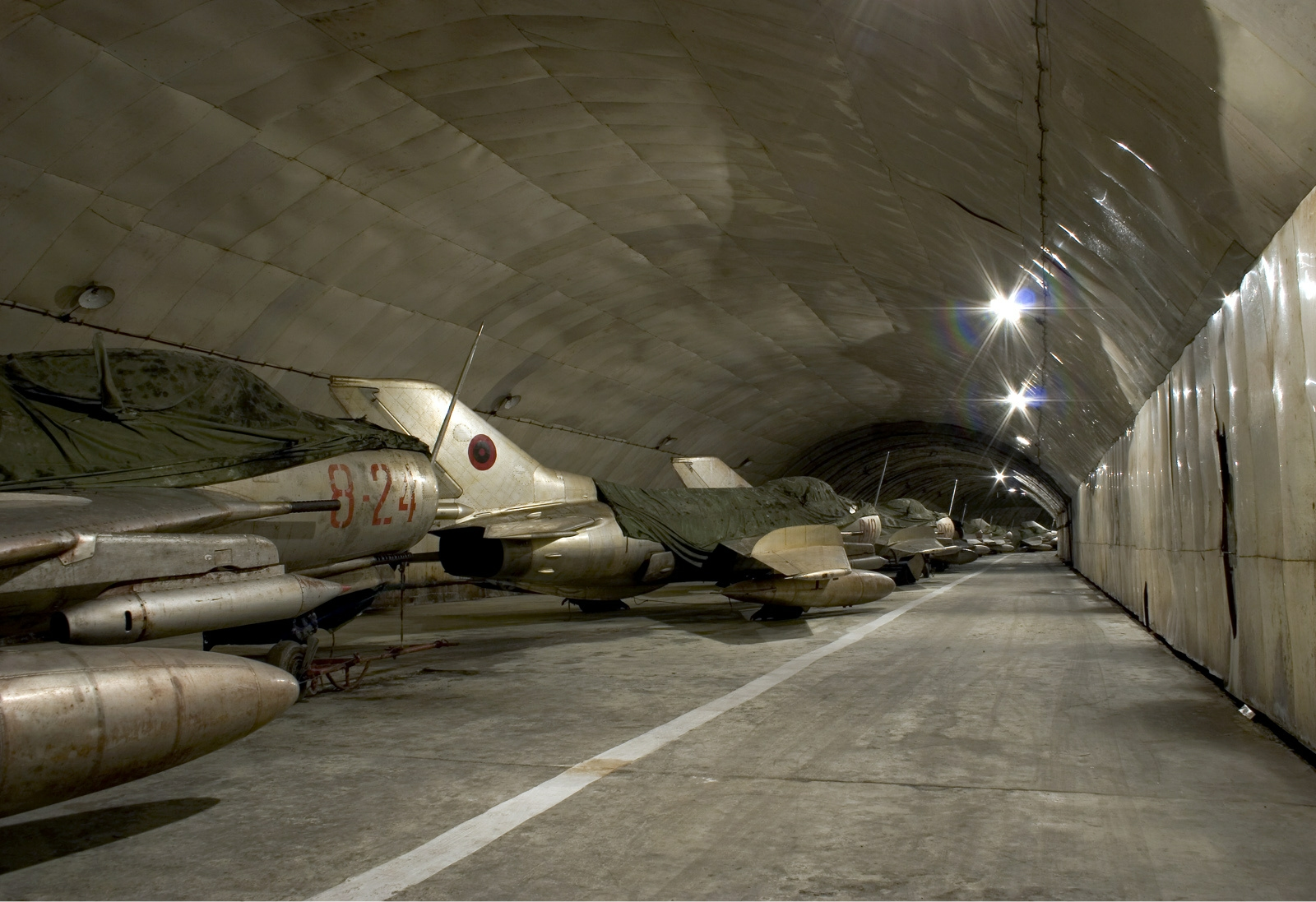
Shenyang F-6 in a mountain tunnel at Gjadër airfield

A feature of Gjadër Air Base is the mountain storage area for aircraft featuring two entrances beside the airfield buildings, accessed by a separate taxiway about 2 km long through farm fields, west of the main taxiway, dispersal, and runway complex.

== See also ==
- List of airports in Albania
