= General Atomics Sparrowhawk =

Small parasite unmanned aerial vehicle

Sparrowhawk

General information
- Type: Parasite Unmanned Aerial Vehicle
- National origin: United States
- Manufacturer: General Atomics Aeronautical Systems
- Status: In development

The General Atomics Sparrowhawk is an unmanned parasite aircraft currently being developed by General Atomics Aeronautical Systems (GA-ASI). First disclosed in 2019 and revealed to the public in September 2020, the Sparrowhawk is intended to offer the United States Air Force a Small Unmanned Aerial System (sUAS) capable of SIGINT/ELINT, ISR, radar imaging, jamming and the possibility for future roles.

== Design and development ==
=== Origins ===
The Sparrowhawk is derived from the General Atomic's submission to the DARPA Gremlins program, which aimed at developing small UAVs that could be deployed and recovered midair by a mothership aircraft. Chris Pehrson, the vide-president of strategic development for Department of Defense customers with General Atomics, stated in 2019 that the planned first flight of the UAV would be in 2020, with a sale to customers expected by 2021. The original information released about the Sparrowhawk (Then referred to as "SparrowHawk") stated it would be jet-powered.

=== Design ===
The Sparrowhawk is a low-wing monoplane with a V-tail configuration. It features a unique wing that can be rotated 90 degrees between stowed and in-flight positions, similar to how an oblique wing works. The wing is stowed while being carried by its parent aircraft, and is deployed when it is dropped from the parent aircraft. It is powered by a hybrid-electric system, using JP-8 fuel to power two electric ducted fans located on the rear of the aircraft, in front of the tail. It offers a variety of roles thanks to its versatile "payload swap" ability. It can carry up to 60lbs (27.2 kg) in its 4500 cubic inch (73,700 cubic centimeter) payload bay, which can draw 2 kilowatts at 28 volts. General Atomics has (so far) proposed its use for imaging sensors, imaging radar, SIGINT/ELINT systems and jamming systems.

To conduct in-flight recovery, the parent aircraft has a tether that is caught by the Sparrowhawk. The tether, which features a small ball on the end, is unreeled from a carrying pylon mounted to a hardpoint. The Sparrowhawk has a catching mechanism consisting of two arms on the fuselage. The rear arm extends as the drone flies up to the tether, and the tether is guided towards the arm by the leading edge of the wing. The second arm then extends and the tether is guided in-between the two arms. Sparrowhawk powers down and tilts towards the side the tether is on, causing the ball on the bottom of the tether to get caught by the top of the arms, which is then locked into the fuselage as the arms close and wing is rotated. The mothership then reels the tether back up and locks the Sparrowhawk to the carrying pylon.

Illustrations released by General Atomics demonstrate that up to four Sparrowhawks could be carried by a single MQ-9 Reaper. The MQ-1C Gray Eagle will likely also have the ability to carry four Sparrowhawks, as GA-ASI has released renderings of a Gray Eagle carrying four sUAS's similar in size to the Sparrowhawk. It was revealed in January 2023 that this alternate sUAS was a different project, known as the "Eaglet" Air-Launched Effect, or "ALE".

=== Testing ===
The first aerial tests regarding the Sparrowhawk were conducted on September 16 and 17, 2020, using Area-I Altius-600 UAVs on board an MQ-1C Gray Eagle. General Atomics released a photo of a prototype Sparrowhawk attached an MQ-9 Reaper on September 25, 2020. The prototype was notably missing its ducted fans, but did maintain most features shown in digital models of the aircraft. In a press release, a video showed that the Sparrowhawk prototype has demonstrated the ability to perform the catch maneuver when controlled by a robotic arm. General Atomics also demonstrated the reeling mechanism on a manned aircraft with a small mockup similar in size to the Sparrowhawk. The Sparrowhawk has also been tested on captive carriage test flights aboard an MQ-9 Reaper.

== Specifications ==
Data from General Atomics Aeronautical Systems

General characteristics

- Crew: 0
- Length: 10.8 ft (3.3 m)
- Wingspan: 14.0 ft (4.3 m)
- Gross weight: 500 lb (227 kg)

Performance

- Maximum speed: 170 mph (280 km/h, 150 kn)
- Cruise speed: 92 mph (150 km/h, 80 kn)
- Range: 580 mi (930 km, 500 nmi)
- Endurance: 10 hours
- Service ceiling: 25,000 ft (7,600 m)

== See also ==
Aircraft of comparable role, configuration, and era

- Dynetics X-61 Gremlins

Related lists

- List of unmanned aerial vehicles
