= Gjadër =

Village in Lezhë County, Albania

- Village
- Location within Albania
- Coordinates: 41°52′48″N 19°35′29″E
- Country: Albania
- County: Lezhë
- Municipality: Lezhë
- Administrative unit: Dajç
- Time zone: UTC+1 (CET)
  - Summer (DST): UTC+2 (CEST)

Gjadër is a settlement in the Lezhë County in northwestern Albania. With the 2015 local government reform, it became part of the municipality of Lezhë. It lies in the Zadrimë region. It is known for the former military air base, which became well known during the Cold War.

== History ==
According to Report of a Visit to Parts of Turkey, Bar, Albania and Serbia (written by Marin Bici, Archbishop of Antivari) Gjadër, at the time, was a village of about eighty houses, the vast majority of which were inhabited by Roman Catholics, while two or three houses were inhabited by Muslims. According to the 1890 register of the Roman Catholic Diocese of Sapë Gjadër at that time had a population of 438 people consisting of 388 Catholics and 50 Muslims.

The population of the village fell from roughly 2,700 in 2001 to approximately 500 in 2025.

In November 2023, Italy and Albania entered into a bilateral migration arrangement allowing Italy to house migrants in detention facilities located in Albania. Since then, an asylum centre with room for 36,000 migrants per year has been built in the military area of Gjadër. Asylum seekers are confined to the site, which, unlike ordinary asylum reception centres, provides no communal areas, recreational activities, sports facilities, or outdoor green spaces. A covering made of metal mesh surrounds the area, giving it the appearance of an enclosed cage. The detention centre in Gjadër has been criticised by politicians and human rights observers for its lack of transparency, prison-like conditions, and serious risks to detainees’ mental health, including reports of frequent self-harm, suicide attempts, and inadequate access to legal and medical safeguards. The asylum centre has room for 36,000 migrants but by October 2025, only 256 have been detained there. In most cases, judicial decisions resulted in their return to Italy.

== Notable people ==
- Gjon Gazulli, ambassador of Skanderbeg
