= General Atomics Aeronautical Systems =

Unmanned aerial vehicles subsidiary of General Atomics

General Atomics Aeronautical Systems, Inc.
- Type: Private
- Industry: Aerospace and defense
- Headquarters: Poway, California, U.S.
- Area served: worldwide (primarily NATO members)
- Products: Unmanned aerial vehicles
- Parent: General Atomics
- Website: www.ga-asi.com

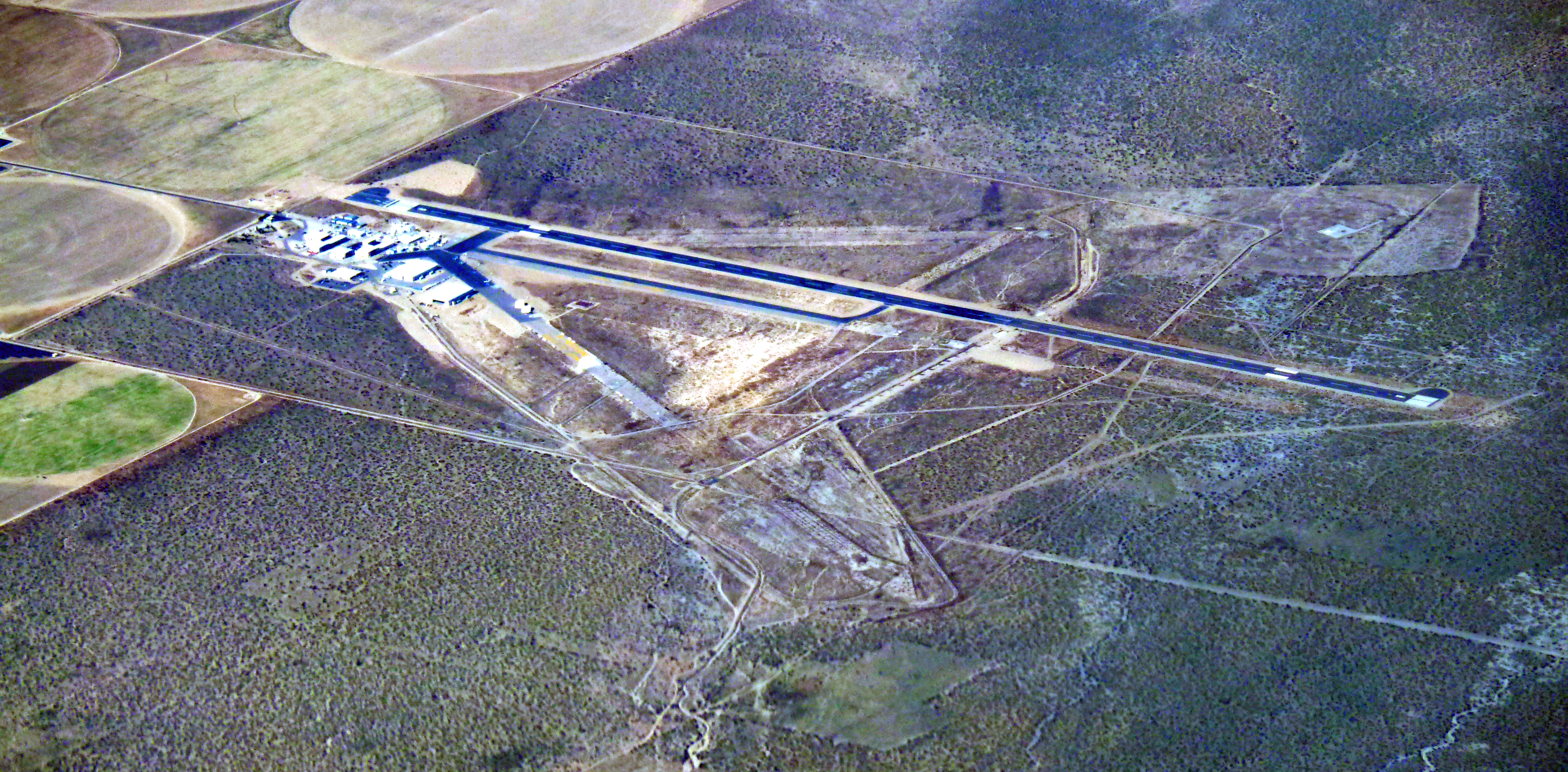
Grey Butte Field, outside El Mirage, California, is used by General Atomics as an operational testing facility for their Predator drones.

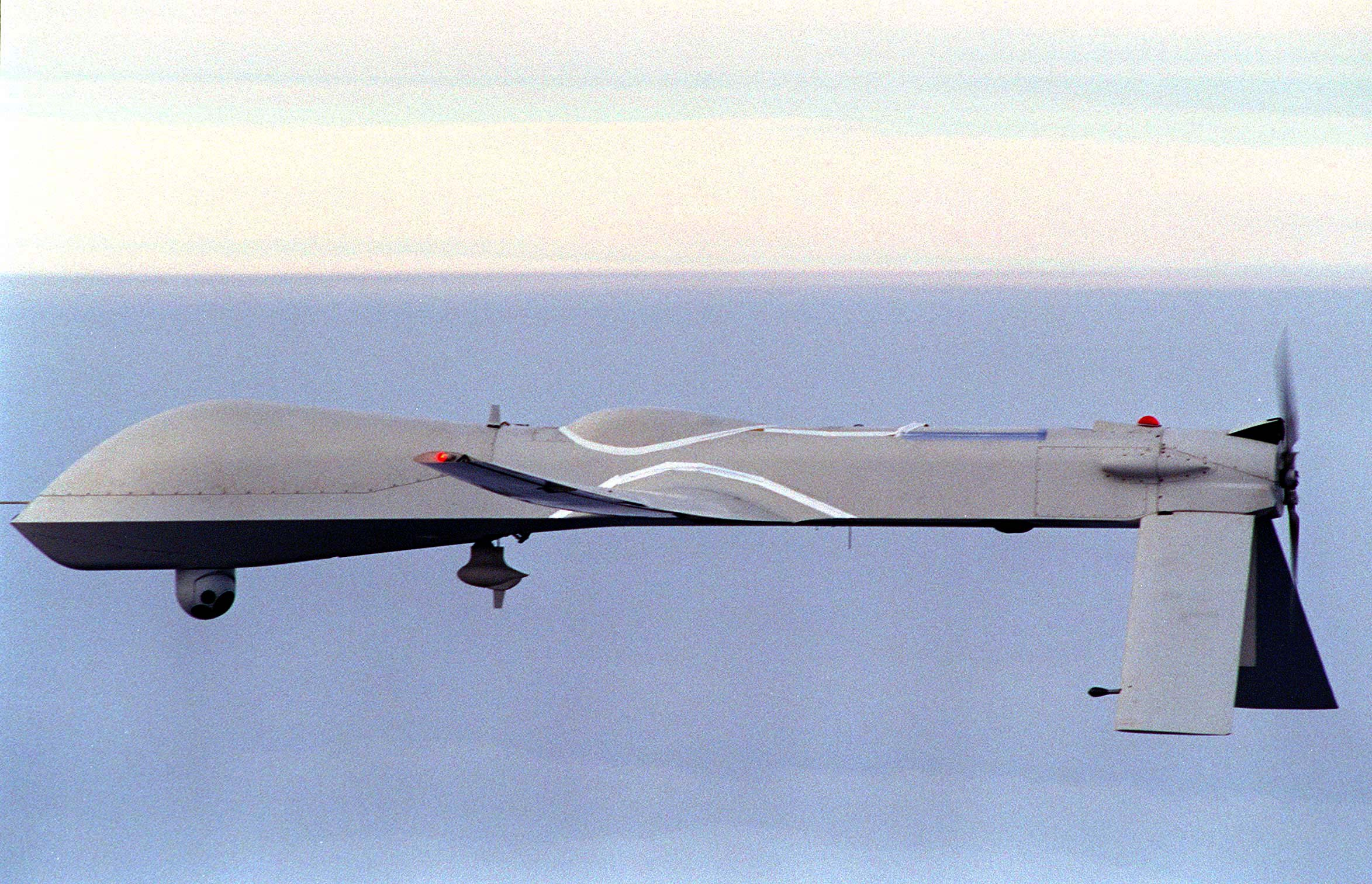
RQ-1 Predator UAV in flight.

General Atomics Aeronautical Systems, Inc. (GA-ASI) is a military contractor and subsidiary of General Atomics that designs and manufactures unmanned aerial vehicles and radar systems for the U.S. military and commercial applications worldwide.

== Operations ==
In November 2021, GA-ASI received a $103.2 million contract from the United States Army, and a $31.7 million contract from the United States Navy on behalf of Belgium.

On 9 December 2021, GA-ASI unveiled the General Atomics Mojave drone.

On 1 February 2023, GA-ASI, along with partner Maritime Applied Physics Corporation won a Phase 1 research contract on DARPA's Liberty Lifter project.

On 6 March 2023, the company announced that DARPA has chosen GA-ASI to carry out the design of the air-launched drone through Critical Design Review (CDR); a LongShot would itself carry an AMRAAM or Sidewinder missile, which greatly extends their range. In this way, an F-15EX or similar 4th-generation fighter can greatly increase its survivability when armed with a LongShot.

On 11 April 2024, the Ministry of Foreign Affairs of China announced a sanction on the company due to its arms sales to Taiwan.

In May 2024, General Atomics lost its bid for the DARPA Liberty Lifter program, with the contract being awarded to Aurora Flight Sciences.

On 4 March 2025, the Chinese Ministry of Commerce placed 15 U.S. entities (including General Atomics Aeronautical Systems) on its export control list, barring the export of dual-use commodities to that business.

== Products ==
- General Atomics Gnat
- General Atomics Prowler
- General Atomics Altus
- General Atomics MQ-1 Predator
- General Atomics MQ-1C Gray Eagle
- General Atomics MQ-9 Reaper
- General Atomics MQ-9B Guardian
- General Atomics MQ-20 Avenger
- General Atomics FQ-42 Dark Merlin - (perspective Gambit series)

=== Projects in active development ===
- General Atomics Eaglet parasite UAS, prototype stage
- General Atomics X-68A LongShot loyal-wingman type UAS, concept stage
- General Atomics Mojave STOL UCAV, derived from the Predator family, prototype stage
- General Atomics Sparrowhawk parasite UAS, prototype stage
- General Atomics XQ-67A - (perspective Gambit series) first flight on 28 February 2024
