= General Atomics Gnat =

Aerial reconnaissance UAV designed in the 1980s

Gnat
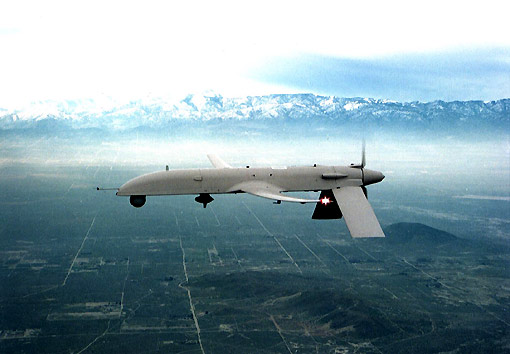

General information
- Type: Reconnaissance UAV
- National origin: United States
- Manufacturer: General Atomics Aeronautical Systems
- Status: Retired
- Primary user: CIA
- Number built: 22+

History
- Manufactured: 1989-?
- Introduction date: Early 1990s
- First flight: 1989
- Developed into: General Atomics MQ-1 Predator

The General Atomics Gnat is an aerial reconnaissance UAV developed in the United States in the late 1980s and manufactured by General Atomics Aeronautical Systems (GA-ASI). As initially designed, it was a simplified version of the LSI Amber intended for foreign sales. The Gnat 750 made its first flight in 1989.

== Design and development ==
The Gnat 750's configuration was similar to that of the Amber, except that the Gnat 750's wing was mounted low on the fuselage, instead of being mounted on a pylon on top. The Gnat 750 was somewhat larger than the Amber, but weighed less and could carry a heavier payload. The original name of the developing company before its acquisition by General Atomics was Leading Systems Incorporated (LSI).

The aircraft is powered by a Rotax 912 piston flat-four four-cycle engine with 64 kW (85 hp). It can fly to an operational area from 2,000 kilometers (1,240 miles) away and loiter there for 12 hours before returning home.

Eight Gnat 750s were in development when General Atomics bought out LSI. General Atomics continued the program, which led to a contract from the Turkish government for a number of the UAVs in 1993. The Turkish Air Force operates 6 Gnat-750 and 16 I-Gnat ER unmanned aerial vehicles.

By this time, the breakup of the old Communist states of Eastern Europe was in full swing, and the United States government wanted to obtain an intelligence asset to help it deal with trouble spots in the region, specifically the former Yugoslavia. A contract was issued to General Atomics for Gnat 750s with minor modifications. The aircraft were to be operated by the CIA.

The program encountered a number of difficulties, much of them due to bureaucratic factionalism and squabbling. One aircraft crashed during tests when it was hit by a gust of wind, causing it to indicate zero airspeed. The UAV's software decided that meant it had landed and shut down the engine, causing the Gnat to fall to earth.

The Gnat 750 effort squeaked through, and in early 1994 the CIA sent a team equipped with a Gnat 750 to Albania to monitor events in the former Yugoslavia. The operation was not a success. The aircraft suffered from a number of bugs and was limited by bad weather, and the team was finally withdrawn. However, the Gnat 750 continued to be built, leading to an "Improved Gnat" or "I-Gnat" variant, with a turbocharged engine and general overall refinements to increase reliability, reduce maintenance, and enhance capability. The Gnat 750 also led to a next-generation derivative, the "Gnat 750-45", much better known as the Predator.

=== Prowler ===
General Atomics also used the Gnat 750 as the basis for a tactical UAV known as the "Prowler". It appears similar to a Gnat 750, but is smaller, with a wingspan of 7.31 meters (24 ft) and a length of 4.24 meters (13.9 ft). It has an endurance of over 16 hours, and some commonality with Gnat 750 subsystems.

== Operators ==
Turkey

- Turkish Air Force: used to operate 22 units. (Former operator, replaced by TAI Anka)

United States

- Central Intelligence Agency: operated Gnat 750 to monitor activity in Albania and Yugoslavia

== Aircraft on display ==
- 11 – Gnat 750 on static display at the Estrella Warbirds Museum in Paso Robles, California.

== Specifications (Gnat 750) ==
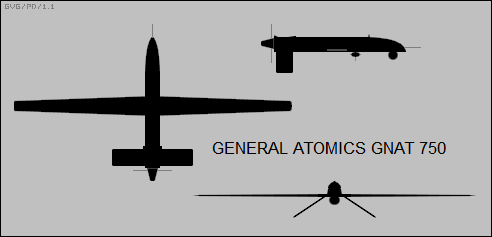

Data from Air Vectors

General characteristics

- Length: 16 ft 5 in (5.00 m)
- Wingspan: 35 ft 4 in (10.77 m)
- Height: 2 ft 5 in (0.74 m)
- Empty weight: 560 lb (254 kg)
- Gross weight: 1,140 lb (517 kg)
- Powerplant: 1 × Rotax 912 , 85 hp (63 kW)
- Propellers: 2-bladed constant-speed pusher propeller

Performance

- Maximum speed: 115 kn (132 mph, 213 km/h)
- Combat range: 1,100 nmi (1,200 mi, 2,000 km) 12 hours loiter
- Endurance: 48 hours
- Service ceiling: 25,000 ft (7,600 m)
