= General Atomics MQ-1 Predator =

Family of unmanned aerial vehicles

RQ-1 / MQ-1 Predator
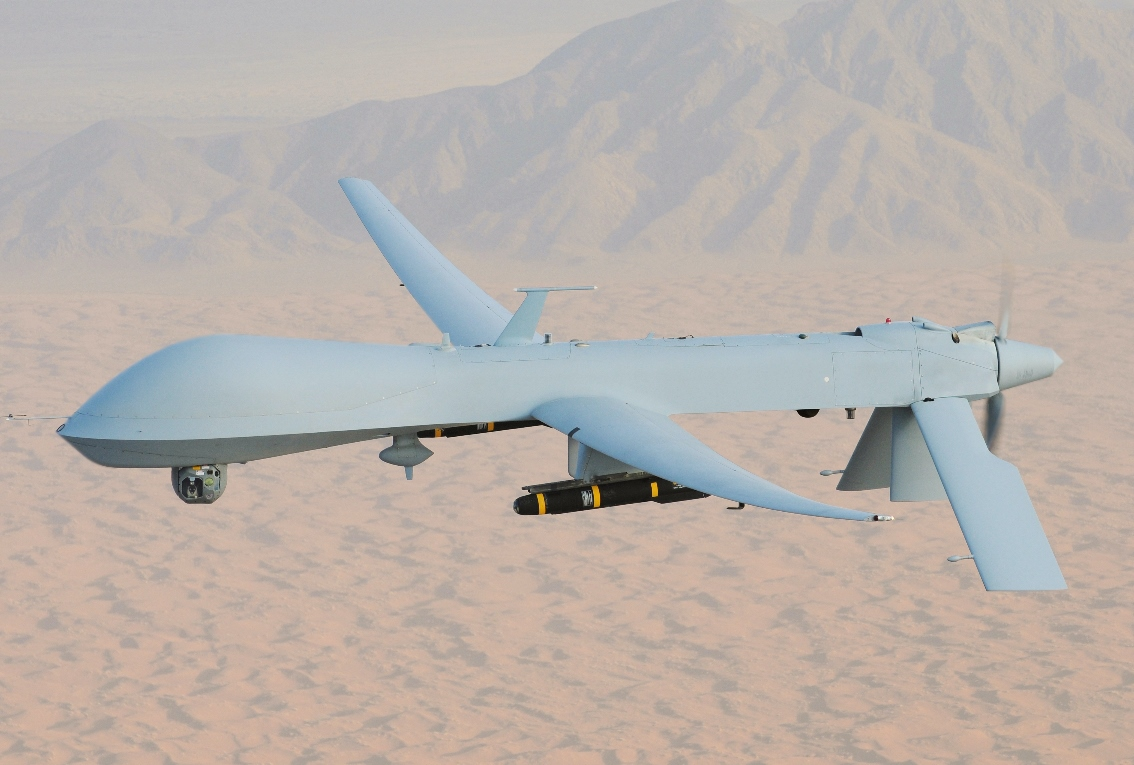
- A US Air Force MQ-1 armed with AGM-114 Hellfire missiles

General information
- Type: Remote piloted aircraft/unmanned combat aerial vehicle
- National origin: United States
- Manufacturer: General Atomics Aeronautical Systems
- Status: In limited service
- Primary users: United States Air Force (retired): Italian Air Force (retired); Turkish Air Force; Royal Moroccan Air Force
- Number built: 360 (285 RQ-1, 75 MQ-1)

History
- Manufactured: 1995–2018
- Introduction date: 1 July 1995
- First flight: 3 July 1994
- Retired: 9 March 2018 (USAF)
- Developed from: General Atomics Gnat
- Variant: General Atomics MQ-1C Gray Eagle
- Developed into: General Atomics MQ-9 Reaper

The General Atomics MQ-1 Predator (often referred to as the Predator drone) is an American remotely piloted aircraft (RPA) built by General Atomics that was used primarily by the United States Air Force (USAF) and Central Intelligence Agency (CIA). Conceived in the early 1990s for aerial reconnaissance and forward observation roles, the Predator carries cameras and other sensors. It was modified and upgraded to carry and fire two AGM-114 Hellfire missiles or other munitions. The aircraft entered service in 1995, and saw combat in the war in Afghanistan, Pakistan, the NATO intervention in Bosnia, the NATO bombing of Yugoslavia, the Iraq War, Yemen, the 2011 Libyan civil war, the 2014 intervention in Syria, and Somalia.

The USAF describes the Predator as a "Tier II" MALE UAS (medium-altitude, long-endurance unmanned aircraft system). The UAS consists of four aircraft or "air vehicles" with sensors, a ground control station (GCS), and a primary satellite link communication suite. Powered by a Rotax engine and driven by a propeller, the air vehicle can fly up to 400 nmi (460 mi; 740 km) to a target, loiter overhead for 14 hours, then return to its base.

The MQ-1 Predator was the primary remotely piloted aircraft used for offensive operations by the USAF and the CIA in Afghanistan and the Pakistani tribal areas from 2001 until the introduction of the MQ-9 Reaper; it has also been deployed elsewhere. Because offensive uses of the Predator are classified by the U.S., U.S. military officials have reported an appreciation for the intelligence and reconnaissance-gathering abilities of RPAs but declined to publicly discuss their offensive use. The United States Air Force retired the Predator in 2018, replacing it with the Reaper.

Civilian applications for drones have included border enforcement and scientific studies, and to monitor wind direction and other characteristics of large forest fires (such as the drone that was used by the California Air National Guard in the August 2013 Rim Fire).

== Development ==
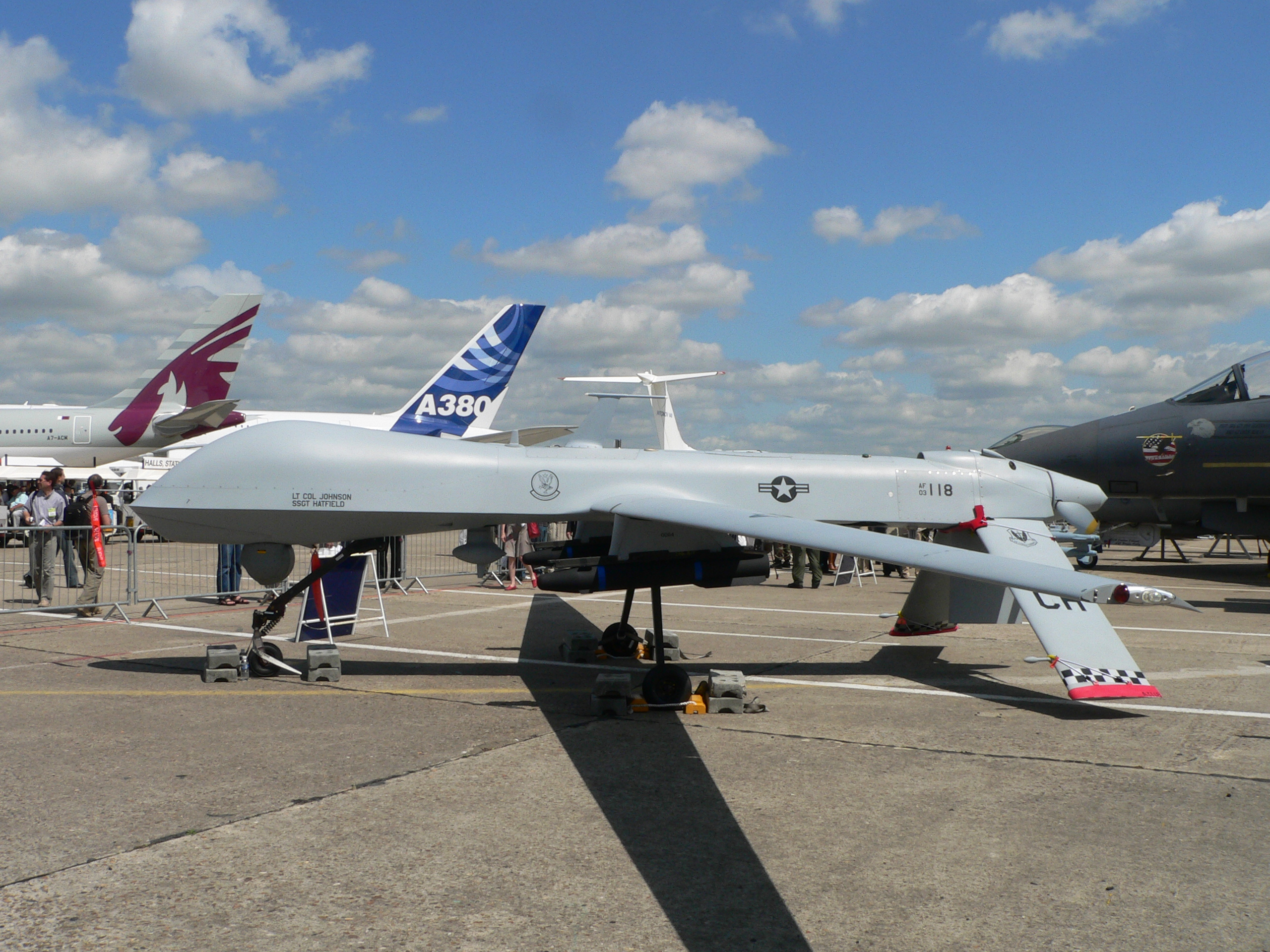
At Paris Air Show 2007

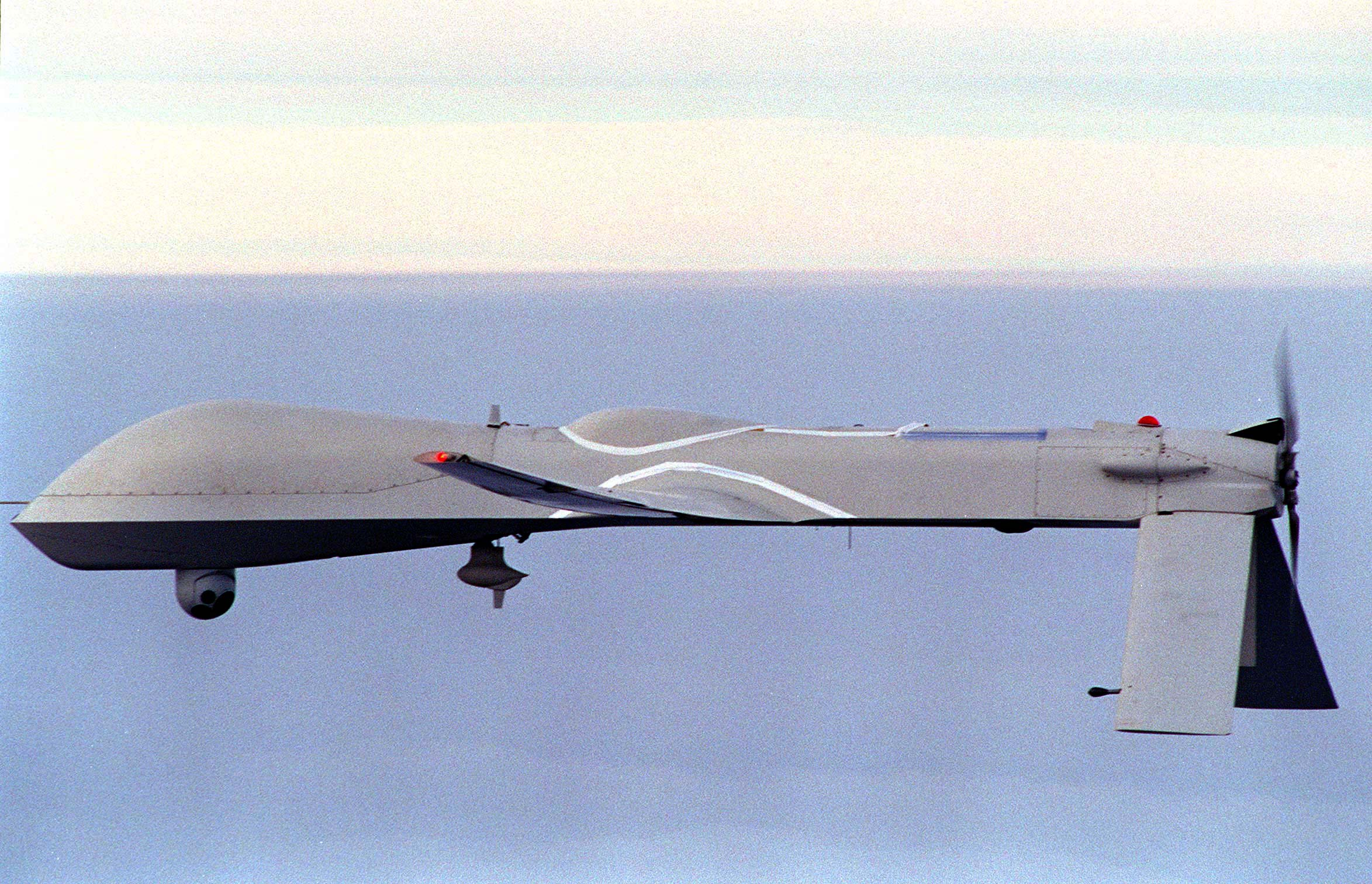
A Predator flies on a simulated Navy aerial reconnaissance flight off the coast of southern California on 5 December 1995.

The Central Intelligence Agency (CIA) and the United States Department of Defense began experimenting with unmanned reconnaissance aircraft (drones) in the early 1980s. The CIA preferred small, lightweight, unobtrusive drones, in contrast to the United States Air Force (USAF). In the early 1990s, the CIA became interested in the "Amber", a drone developed by Leading Systems, Inc. The company's owner, Abraham Karem, was the former chief designer for the Israeli Air Force, and had immigrated to the U.S. in the late 1970s. Karem's company went bankrupt and was bought by a U.S. defense contractor, from whom the CIA secretly bought five drones (now called the "Gnat"). Karem agreed to produce a quiet engine for the vehicle, which had until then sounded like "a lawnmower in the sky". The new development became known as the "Predator".

General Atomics Aeronautical Systems (GA) was awarded a contract to develop the Predator in January 1994, and the initial Advanced Concept Technology Demonstration (ACTD) phase lasted from January 1994 to June 1996. First flight took place on 3 July 1994 at the El Mirage airfield in the Mojave Desert. The aircraft itself was a derivative of the GA Gnat 750. During the ACTD phase, three systems were purchased from GA, comprising twelve aircraft and three ground control stations.

From April through May 1995, the Predator ACTD aircraft were flown as a part of the Roving Sands 1995 exercises in the U.S. The exercise operations were successful which led to the decision to deploy the system to the Balkans later in the summer of 1995.

During the ACTD, Predators were operated by a combined Army/Navy/Air Force/Marine team managed by the Navy's Joint Program Office for Unmanned Aerial Vehicles (JPO-UAV). They were first deployed to Gjadër Aerodrome in northern Albania, for operations in the former Yugoslavia in spring 1995. The operating unit appears to have been an Army unit, the Military Intelligence Battalion (Low Intensity).

The Predator entered squadron service with the USAF's 11th Reconnaissance Squadron in 1996. On 1 August 1997 it was joined by the 15th Reconnaissance Squadron.

By the start of the War in Afghanistan (2001–2021), the USAF had acquired 60 Predators, but lost 20 of them in action. Few if any of the losses were from enemy action, the worst problem apparently being foul weather, particularly icy conditions. Some critics within the Pentagon saw the high loss rate as a sign of poor operational procedures. In response to the losses caused by cold weather conditions, a few of the later USAF Predators were fitted with de-icing systems, along with a more powerful turbocharged engine and improved avionics. This improved "Block 1" version was referred to as the "RQ-1B", or the "MQ-1B" if it carried munitions; the corresponding air vehicle designation was "RQ-1L" or "MQ-1L".

The Predator system was initially designated the RQ-1 Predator. The "R" is the United States Department of Defense designation for reconnaissance and the "Q" refers to an unmanned aircraft system. The "1" describes it as being the first of a series of aircraft systems built for unmanned reconnaissance. Pre-production systems were designated as RQ-1A, while the RQ-1B (not to be confused with the Predator B, which became the MQ-9 Reaper) denotes the baseline production configuration. These are designations of the system as a unit. The actual aircraft themselves were designated RQ-1K for pre-production models, and RQ-1L for production models. In 2002, the USAF officially changed the designation to MQ-1 ("M" for multi-role) to reflect its growing use as an armed aircraft.

=== Command and sensor systems ===
During campaign in the former Yugoslavia, a Predator's pilot would sit with several payload specialists in a van near the runway of the drone's operating base. Direct radio signals controlled the drone's takeoff and initial ascent, and then communications shifted to military satellite networks linked to the pilot's van. Pilots experienced a delay of several seconds between moving their sticks and the drone's response. But by 2000, improvements in communications systems made it possible, at least in theory, to fly the drone remotely from great distances. It was no longer necessary to use close-up radio signals during the Predator's takeoff and ascent. The entire flight could be controlled by satellite from any command and control center with the right equipment. The CIA proposed to attempt over Afghanistan the first fully remote Predator flight operations, piloted from the agency's headquarters at Langley.

The Predator air vehicle and sensors are controlled from the ground control station (GCS) via a C-band line-of-sight data link or a K_{u}-band satellite data link for beyond-line-of-sight operations. During flight operations the crew in the GCS is a pilot and two sensor operators. The aircraft is equipped with the AN/AAS-52 Multi-spectral Targeting System, a color nose camera (generally used by the pilot for flight control), a variable aperture day-TV camera, and a variable aperture thermographic camera (for low light/night). Previously, Predators were equipped with a synthetic aperture radar for looking through smoke, clouds or haze, but lack of use validated its removal to reduce weight and conserve fuel. The cameras produce full motion video and the synthetic aperture radar produced still frame radar images. There is sufficient bandwidth on the datalink for two video sources to be used together, but only one video source from the sensor ball can be used due to design limitations. Either the daylight variable aperture or the infrared electro-optical sensor may be operated simultaneously with the synthetic aperture radar, if equipped.

All later Predators are equipped with a laser designator that allows the pilot to identify targets for other aircraft and even provide the laser guidance for manned aircraft. This laser is also the designator for the AGM-114 Hellfire that are carried on the MQ-1.

=== Deployment methodology ===
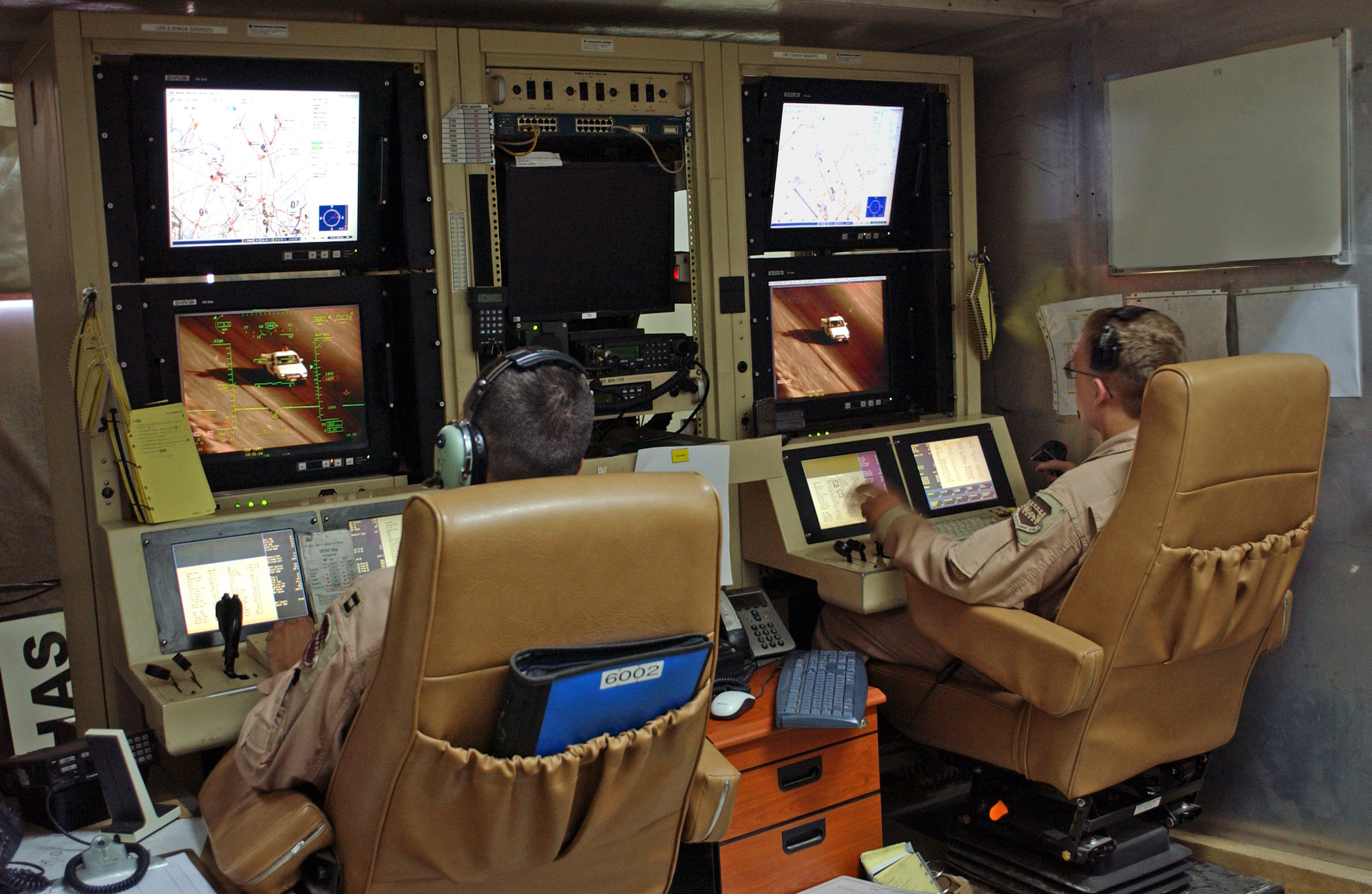
Predator operators at Balad Camp Anaconda, Iraq, August 2007

Each Predator air vehicle can be disassembled into six modules and loaded into a container. This enables all system components and support equipment to be rapidly deployed worldwide. The largest component is the ground control station (GCS) which is designed to roll into a C-130 Hercules. The Predator primary satellite link consists of a 6.1-meter (20-ft) satellite dish with associated support equipment. The satellite link provides communications between the GCS and the aircraft when it is beyond line-of-sight and links to networks that disseminate secondary intelligence. The RQ-1A system can operate on a 5,000 by 75 foot (1,524 meters by 23 meters) of hard surface runway with clear line-of-sight to each end from the GCS to the air vehicles. Initially, all components needed to be located on the same airfield.

The U.S. Air Force used a concept called "Remote-Split Operations" where the satellite datalink is placed in a different location and is connected to the GCS through fiber optic cabling. This allows Predators to be launched and recovered by a small "Launch and Recovery Element" and then handed off to a "Mission Control Element" for the rest of the flight. This allows a smaller number of troops to be deployed to a forward location, and consolidates control of the different flights in one location.

The improvements in the MQ-1B production version include an ARC-210 radio, an APX-100 IFF/SIF with mode 4, a glycol-weeping "wet wings" de-icing system, upgraded turbo-charged engine, fuel injection, longer wings, dual alternators as well as other improvements.

On 18 May 2006, the Federal Aviation Administration (FAA) issued a certificate of authorization which will allow the M/RQ-1 and M/RQ-9 aircraft to be used within U.S. civilian airspace to search for survivors of disasters. Requests had been made in 2005 for the aircraft to be used in search and rescue operations following Hurricane Katrina, but because there was no FAA authorization in place at the time, the assets were not used. The Predator's infrared camera with digitally enhanced zoom has the capability of identifying the infrared signature of a human body from an altitude of 3 km (10,000 ft), making the aircraft an ideal search and rescue tool.

The longest declassified Predator flight as of 2011 lasted for 40 hours and 5 minutes. The total flight time reached 1 million hours in April 2010, according to General Atomics Aeronautical Systems Inc.

=== Armed versions ===
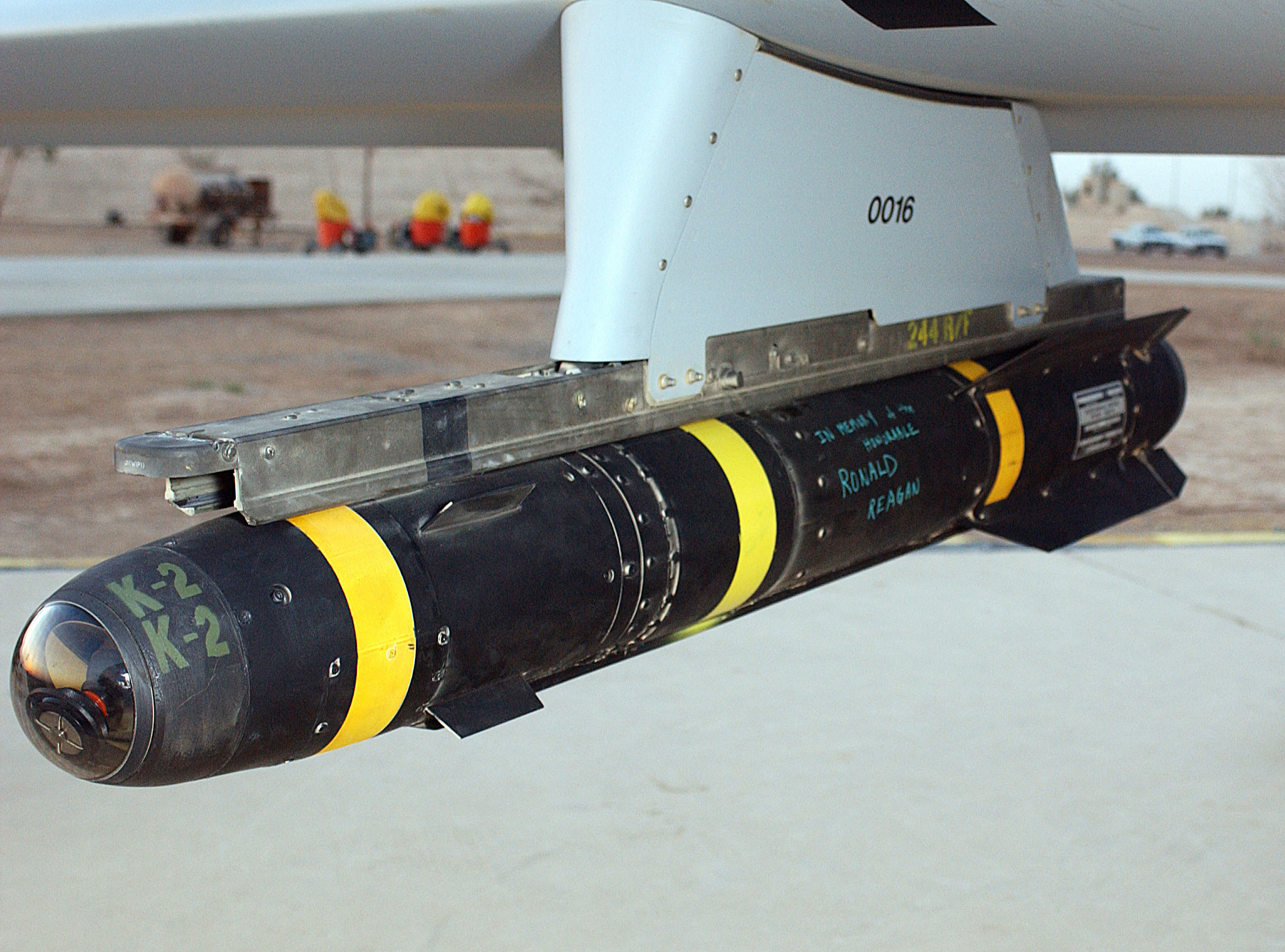
Close-up of the Hellfire missile pylon, 2004.

The USAF BIG SAFARI program office managed the Predator program and was directed on 21 June 2000 to explore armament options. This led to reinforced wings with munitions storage pylons, as well as a laser designator. The RQ-1 unmanned combat aerial vehicle conducted its first firing of a Hellfire anti-tank missile on 16 February 2001 over a bombing range near Indian Springs Air Force Station north of Las Vegas, Nevada, with an inert AGM-114C successfully striking a tank target. Then on 21 February 2001 the Predator fired three Hellfire missiles, scoring hits on a stationary tank with all three missiles. Following the February tests, phase two involved more complex tests to hunt for simulated moving targets from greater altitudes with the more advanced AGM-114K version. The armed Predators were put into service with the designation MQ-1A. The Predator gives little warning of attack because it is relatively quiet and the Hellfire is supersonic, so it strikes before it is heard by the target.

In the winter of 2000–2001, after seeing the results of Predator reconnaissance in Afghanistan, Cofer Black, head of the CIA's Counterterrorist Center (CTC), became a vocal advocate of arming the Predator with missiles to target Osama bin Laden in country. He believed that CIA pressure and practical interest were causing the USAF's armed Predator program to be significantly accelerated. Black, and "Richard", who was in charge of the CTC's Bin Laden Issue Station, continued to press during 2001 for a Predator armed with Hellfire missiles.

Further weapons tests occurred between 22 May and 7 June 2001, with mixed results. While missile accuracy was excellent, there were some problems with missile fuzing. In the first week of June, in the Nevada desert, a Hellfire missile was successfully launched on a replica of bin Laden's Afghanistan Tarnak residence. A missile launched from a Predator exploded inside one of the replica's rooms; it was concluded that any people in the room would have been killed. However, the armed Predator was not deployed before the September 11 attacks.

The USAF also investigated using the Predator to drop battlefield ground sensors and to carry and deploy the "Finder" mini-UAV.

=== Other versions and fate ===
Two unarmed versions, known as the General Atomics ALTUS were built, ALTUS I for the Naval Postgraduate School and ALTUS II for the NASA ERAST Project in 1997 and 1996, respectively.

Based on the MQ-1 Predator, the General Atomics MQ-1C Gray Eagle was developed for the U.S. Army.

The USAF ordered a total of 259 Predators, but due to retirements and crashes the number in Air Force operation had declined to 154 as of May 2014. Budget proposals planned to retire the Predator fleet between FY 2015 and 2017 in favor of the larger MQ-9 Reaper, which has greater payload and range. The Predators were to be stored at Davis-Monthan Air Force Base or given to other agencies willing to take them. The U.S. Customs and Border Protection showed interest, but already had higher-performance Reapers and were burdened with operating costs. The U.S. Coast Guard also showed interest in land-based UAV surveillance. Foreign sales were also an option, but the MQ-1 is subject to limitations of the Missile Technology Control Regime because it can be armed; export markets are also limited by the existence of the Reaper. Given the Predator's pending phase-out and its size, weight, and power limitations, the Air Force decided not to pursue upgrades to make it more effective in contested environments, and determined its only use in defended airspace would be as a decoy to draw fire away from other aircraft. Due to airborne surveillance needs after the Islamic State of Iraq and the Levant (ISIL) invaded Iraq, the Predator's retirement was delayed to 2018. MQ-1s will probably be placed in non-recoverable storage at the Boneyard and not sold to allies, although antenna, ground control stations, and other components may be salvaged for continued use on other airframes.

General Atomics completed the final RQ-1 ordered by Italy by October 2015, marking the end of Predator A production after two decades. The last Predator for the USAF was completed in 2011; later Predator aircraft were built on the Predator XP assembly line.

The United States Air Force announced plans to retire the MQ-1 on 9 March 2018. The Predator was officially retired from USAF service in March 2018.

== Operational history ==
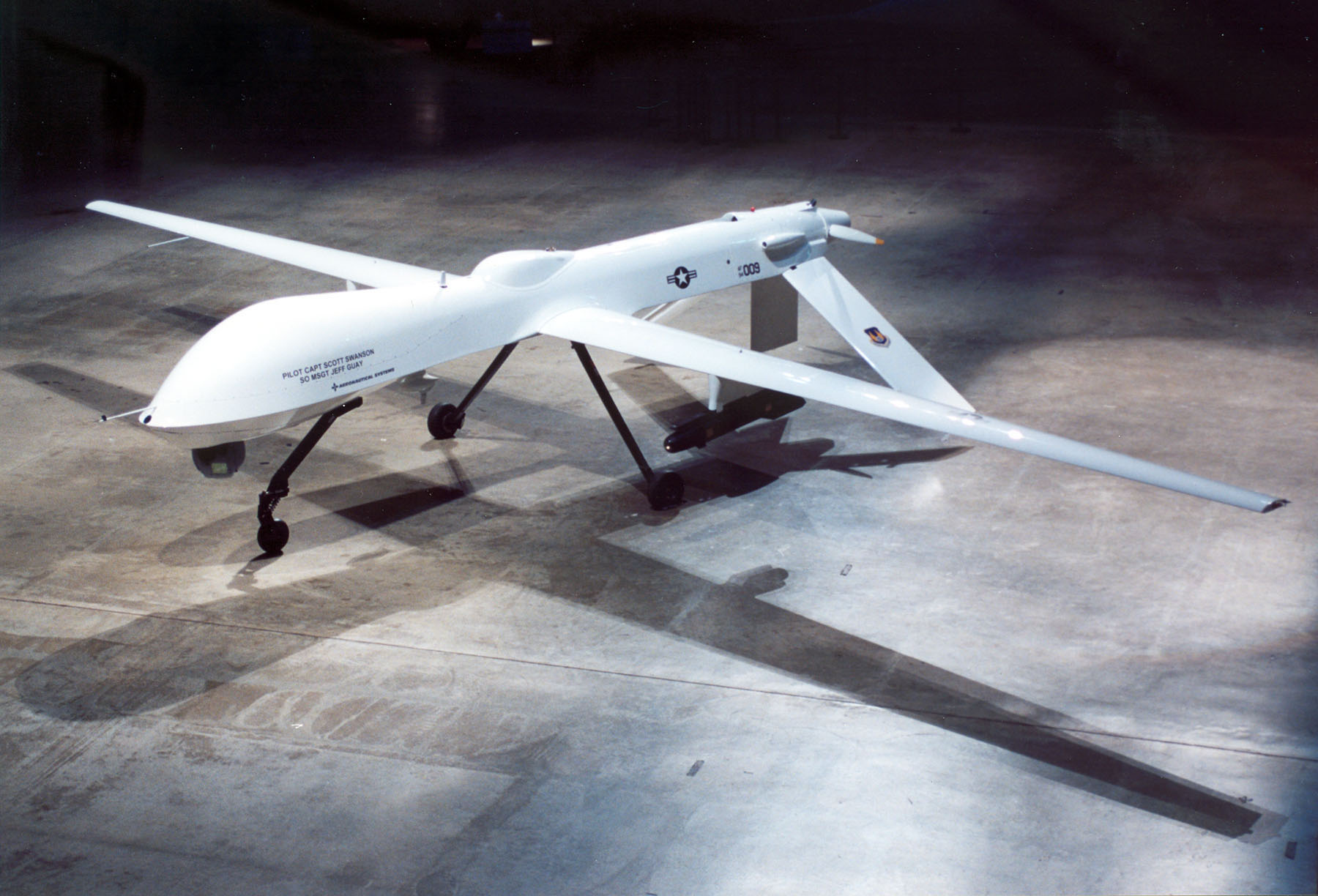
RQ-1A Predator

As of March 2009, the U.S. Air Force had 195 MQ-1 Predators and 28 MQ-9 Reapers in operation. Predators and Reapers fired missiles 244 times in Iraq and Afghanistan in 2007 and 2008. A report in March 2009 indicated that U.S. Air Force had lost 70 Predators in air crashes during its operational history. Fifty-five were lost to equipment failure, operator error, or weather. Five were shot down in Bosnia, Kosovo, Syria and Iraq. Eleven more were lost to operational accidents on combat missions. In 2012, the Predator, Reaper and Global Hawk were described as "the most accident-prone aircraft in the Air Force fleet."

On 3 March 2011, the U.S. Air Force took delivery of its last MQ-1 Predator in a ceremony at General Atomics' flight operations facility. Since its first flight in July 1994, the MQ-1 series accumulated over 1,000,000 flight hours and maintained a fleet fully mission capable rate over 90 percent.

Predator Drone in Kandahar Airbase

On 22 October 2013, the U.S. Air Force's fleets of MQ-1 Predators and MQ-9 Reaper remotely piloted aircraft reached 2,000,000 flight hours. The RPA program began in the mid-1990s, taking 16 years for them to reach 1 million flight hours. The 2 million hour mark was reached just two and a half years after that.

On 9 March 2018, the U.S. Air Force officially retired the MQ-1 Predator from operational service. The aircraft was first operationally deployed in 1995 and in 2011 the last of 268 Predators were delivered to the service, of which just over 100 were still in service by the start of 2018. While the Predator was phased out by the Air Force in favor of the heavier and more capable MQ-9 Reaper, the Predator continues to serve in the MQ-1C Gray Eagle derivative for the U.S. Army as well as with several foreign nations.

=== Squadrons and operational units ===
During the initial ACTD phase, the United States Army led the evaluation program, but in April 1996, the Secretary of Defense selected the U.S. Air Force as the operating service for the RQ-1A Predator system. The 3d Special Operations Squadron at Cannon Air Force Base, 11th, 15th, 17th, and 18th Reconnaissance Squadrons, Creech Air Force Base, Nevada, and the Air National Guard's 163d Reconnaissance Wing at March Air Reserve Base, California, currently operate the MQ-1.

In 2005, the U.S. Department of Defense recommended retiring Ellington Field's 147th Fighter Wing's F-16 Fighting Falcon fighter jets (a total of 15 aircraft), which was approved by the Base Realignment and Closure committee. They will be replaced with 12 MQ-1 Predator UAVs, and the new unit should be fully equipped and outfitted by 2009. The wing's combat support arm will remain intact. The 272d Engineering Installation Squadron, an Air National Guard unit currently located off-base, will move into Ellington Field in its place.

The 3d Special Operations Squadron is currently the largest Predator squadron in the United States Air Force.

U.S. Customs and Border Protection was reported in 2013 to be operating 10 Predators and to have requested 14 more.

On 21 June 2009, the United States Air Force announced that it was creating a new MQ-1 squadron at Whiteman Air Force Base that would become operational by February 2011. In September 2011, the U.S. Air National Guard announced that despite current plans for budget cuts, they will continue to operate the Air Force's combat UAVs, including MQ-1B.

On 28 August 2013, a Predator belonging to the 163d Reconnaissance Wing was flying at 18,000 to 20,000 feet over the Rim Fire in California providing infrared video of lurking fires, after receiving emergency approvals. Rules limit the Predator behavior; it must be accompanied by a manned aircraft, and its camera must only be active above the fire.

In September 2013, the Air Force Special Operations Command tested the ability to rapidly deploy Predator aircraft. Two MQ-1s were loaded into a Boeing C-17 Globemaster III in a cradle system that also carried a control terminal, maintenance tent, and the crew. The test was to prove the UAVs could be deployed and set up at an expeditionary base within four hours of landing. In a recent undisclosed deployment, airmen set up a portable hangar in a tent and a wooden taxiway to operate MQ-1s for a six-week period.

=== The Balkans ===
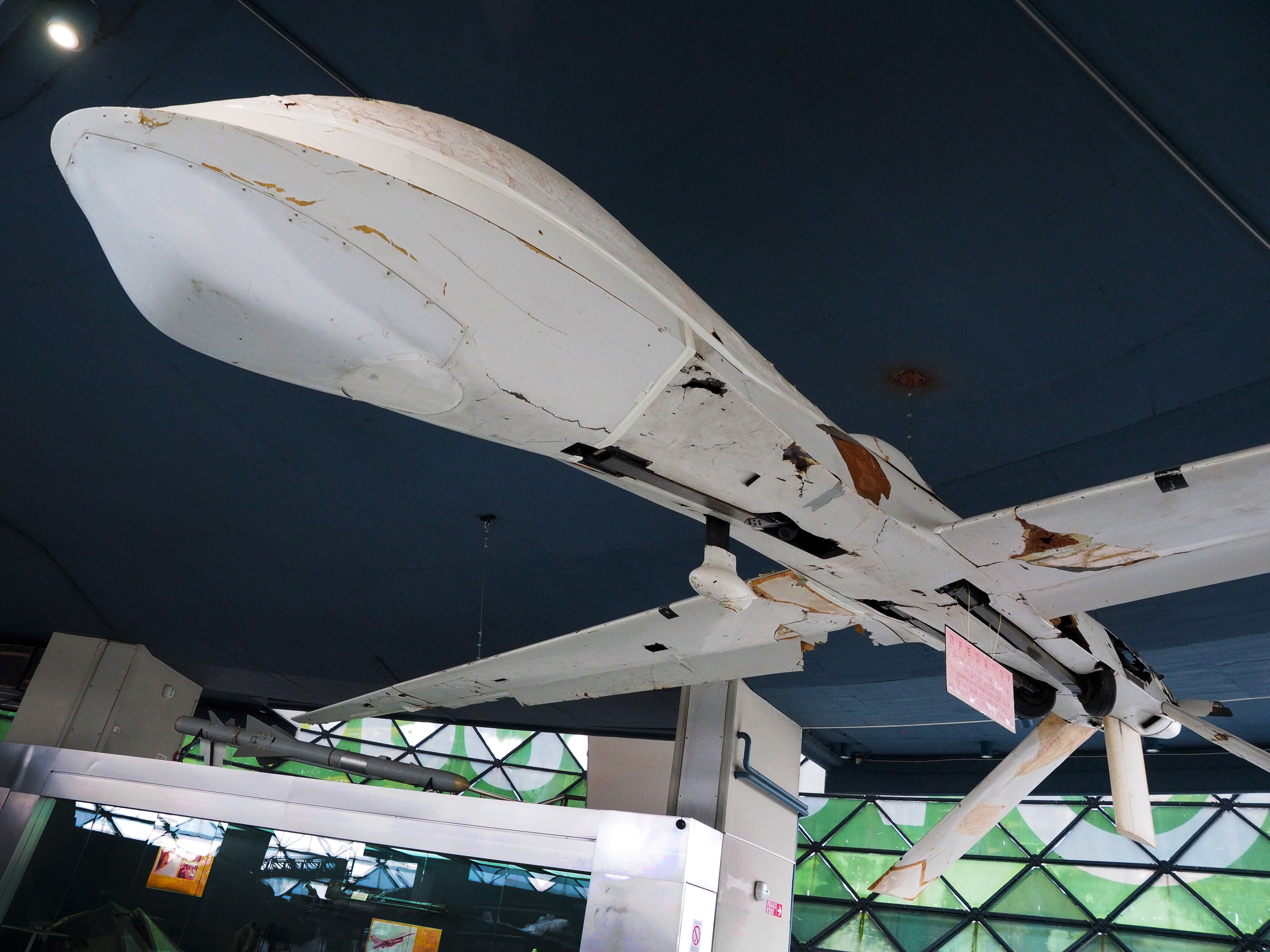
A shot down RQ-1 Predator in the Museum of Aviation in Belgrade, Serbia

The first overseas deployment took place in the Balkans, from July to November 1995, under the name Nomad Vigil. Operations were based in Gjader, Albania. Four disassembled Predators were flown into Gjadër airbase in a C-130 Hercules. The UAVs were assembled and flown first by civilian contract personnel. The U.S. deployed more than 70 military intelligence personnel. Intelligence collection missions began in 1995.

One of the Predators was lost over Krepšić, near Brčko, northern Bosnia, on 11 August 1995; a second one was deliberately destroyed on 14 August after suffering an engine failure over Bosnia, which may have been caused by hostile ground fire. Serb forces claim the shooting down of a third Predator over Nevesinje, Herzegovina, on 5 September, during Operation Deliberate Force. The wreckage of the first Predator was handed over to Russia, according to Serb sources. Its original 60-day stay was extended to 120 days. The following spring, in March 1996, the system was redeployed to the Balkans area and operated out of Taszar, Hungary.

Several others were destroyed in the course of Operation Noble Anvil, the 1999 NATO bombing of Yugoslavia:

- One aircraft (serial 95-3017) was lost on 18 April 1999, following fuel system problems and icing.
- A second aircraft (serial 95-3019) was lost on 13 May, when it was shot down by a Serbian Strela-1M surface-to-air missile over the village of Biba. A Serbian TV crew videotaped this incident.
- A third aircraft (serial number 95-3021) crashed on 20 May near the town of Talinovci, and Serbian news reported that this, too, was the result of anti-aircraft fire.

=== Afghanistan ===
In 2000, a joint CIA-DoD effort was agreed to locate Osama bin Laden in Afghanistan. Dubbed "Afghan Eyes", it involved a projected 60-day trial run of Predators over the country. The first experimental flight was held on 7 September 2000. White House security chief Richard A. Clarke was impressed by the resulting video footage; he hoped that the drones might eventually be used to target Bin Laden with cruise missiles or armed aircraft. Clarke's enthusiasm was matched by that of Cofer Black, head of the CIA's Counterterrorist Center (CTC), and Charles Allen, in charge of the CIA's intelligence-collection operations. The three men backed an immediate trial run of reconnaissance flights. Ten out of the ensuing 15 Predator missions over Afghanistan were rated successful. On at least two flights, a Predator spotted a tall man in white robes at bin Laden's Tarnak Farm compound outside Kandahar; the figure was subsequently deemed to be "probably bin Laden". By October 2000, deteriorating weather conditions made it difficult for the Predator to fly from its base in Uzbekistan, and the flights were suspended.

Predator Drone viewed from the front

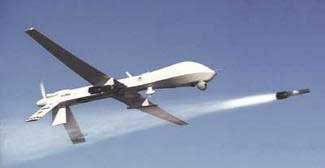
Predator launching a Hellfire missile

On 16 February 2001 at Nellis Air Force Base, a Predator successfully fired three Hellfire AGM-114C missiles into a target. The newly armed Predators were given the designation of MQ-1A. In the first week of June 2001, a Hellfire missile was successfully launched on a replica of bin Laden's Afghanistan Tarnak residence built at a Nevada testing site. A missile launched from a Predator exploded inside one of the replica's rooms; it was concluded that any people in the room would have been killed. On 4 September 2001 (after the Bush cabinet approved a Qaeda/Taliban plan), CIA chief Tenet ordered the agency to resume reconnaissance flights. The Predators were now weapons-capable, but did not carry missiles because the host country (presumably Uzbekistan) hadn't granted permission.

Subsequent to 9/11, approval was quickly granted to ship the missiles, and the Predator aircraft and missiles reached their overseas location on 16 September 2001. The first mission was flown over Kabul and Kandahar on 18 September without carrying weapons. Subsequent host nation approval was granted on 7 October and the first armed mission was flown on the same day.

- In February 2002, armed Predators are thought to have been used to destroy a sport utility vehicle belonging to suspected Taliban leader Mullah Mohammed Omar and mistakenly killed Afghan scrap metal collectors near Zhawar Kili because one of them resembled Osama bin Laden.
- On 4 March 2002, a CIA-operated Predator fired a Hellfire missile into a reinforced Taliban machine gun bunker that had pinned down an Army Ranger team whose CH-47 Chinook had crashed on the top of Takur Ghar Mountain in Afghanistan. Previous attempts by flights of F-15 and F-16 Fighting Falcon aircraft were unable to destroy the bunker. This action took place during what has become known as the "Battle of Roberts Ridge", a part of Operation Anaconda. This appears to be the first use of such a weapon in a close air support role.
- On 6 April 2011, 2 US soldiers were killed in Afghanistan when the Predator had its first friendly fire incident. This occurred when observers in Indiana did not relay their doubts about the target to the operators at Creech Air Force Base in Nevada.

On 5 May 2013, an MQ-1 Predator surpassed 20,000 flight hours over Afghanistan by a single Predator. Predator P107 achieved the milestone while flying a 21-hour combat mission; P107 was first delivered in October 2004.

=== Pakistan ===
From at least 2003 until 2011, the U.S. Central Intelligence Agency has allegedly been operating the drones out of Shamsi airfield in Pakistan to attack militants in Pakistan's Federally Administered Tribal Areas. During this period, the MQ-1 Predator fitted with Hellfire missiles was successfully used to kill a number of prominent al Qaeda operatives.

On 13 January 2006, 18 civilians were unintentionally killed by the Predator. According to Pakistani authorities, the U.S. strike was based on faulty intelligence.

=== Iraq ===
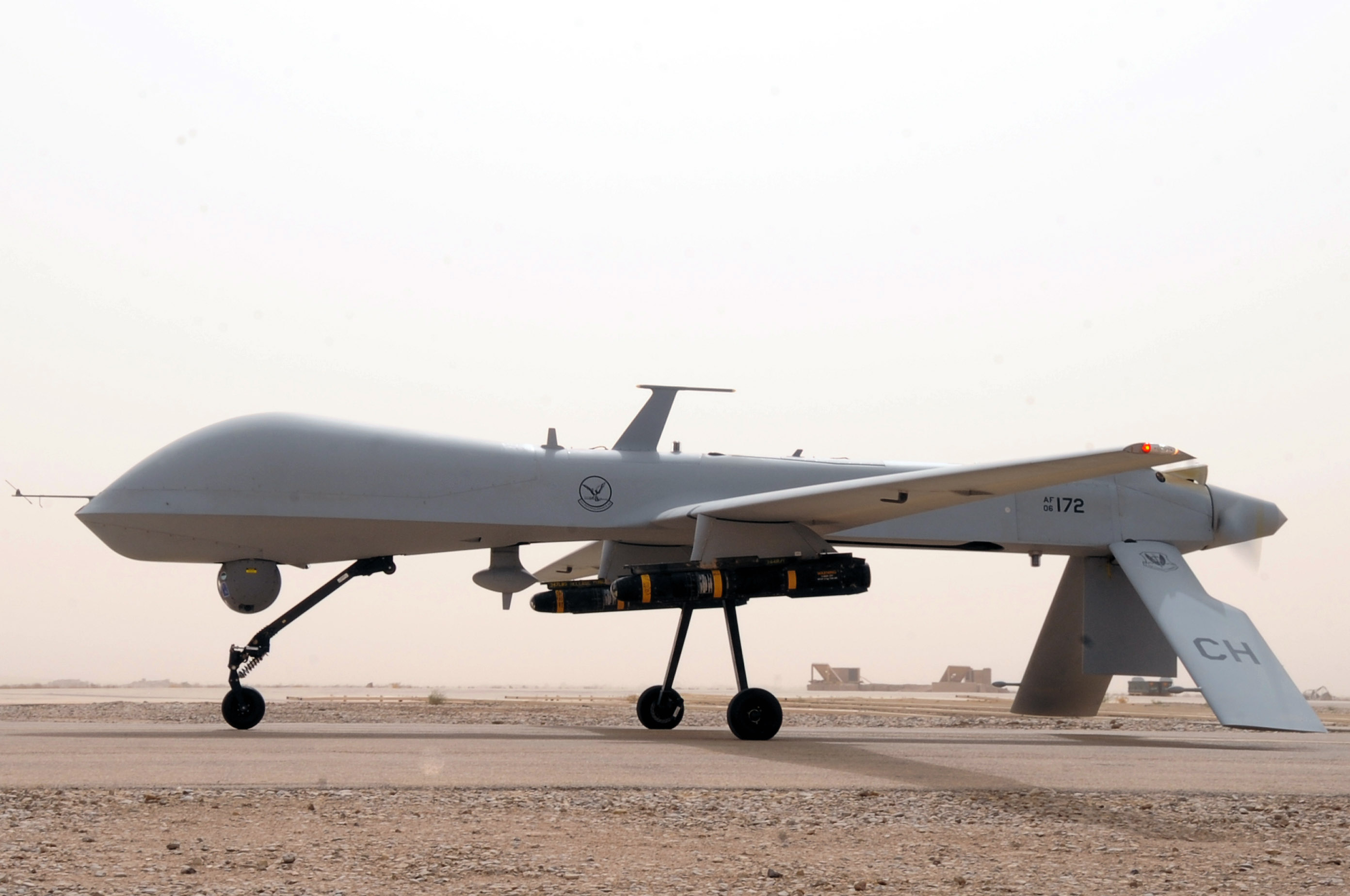
An MQ-1B Predator from the 361st Expeditionary Reconnaissance Squadron takes off 9 July 2008 from Ali Base, Iraq.

An Iraqi MiG-25 shot down a Predator performing reconnaissance over the no fly zone in Iraq on 23 December 2002. This was the first time in history a conventional aircraft and a drone had engaged each other in combat. Predators had been armed with AIM-92 Stinger air-to-air missiles, and were purportedly being used to "bait" Iraqi fighters, then run. However, the Predator's maximum speed is 135 mph (217 km/h) lower than the MiG-25's, and its service ceiling is nearly 60,000 ft (18,000 m) lower, making the "run" segment of any "bait and run" mission a difficult task. In this incident, the Predator did not run (or could not run fast enough), but instead fired one of its Stingers. The Stinger's heat-seeker became "distracted" by the MiG's missile and missed the MiG. The Predator was hit by the MiG's missile and destroyed. Another two Predators had been shot down earlier by Iraqi SAMs.

During the initial phases of the 2003 U.S. invasion of Iraq, a number of older Predators were stripped down and used as decoys to entice Iraqi air defenses to expose themselves by firing. From July 2005 to June 2006, the 15th Reconnaissance Squadron participated in more than 242 separate raids, engaged 132 troops in contact-force protection actions, fired 59 Hellfire missiles; surveyed 18,490 targets, escorted four convoys, and flew 2,073 sorties for more than 33,833 flying hours.

Iraqi insurgents intercepted video feeds, which were not encrypted, using a $26 piece of Russian software named SkyGrabber. The encryption for the ROVER feeds was removed for performance reasons. Work to secure the data feeds was to be completed by 2014.

On 27 June 2014, the Pentagon confirmed that a number of armed Predators had been sent to Iraq along with U.S. Special Forces following advances by the Islamic State of Iraq and the Levant. The Predators were flying 30 to 40 missions a day in and around Baghdad with government permission, and intelligence was shared with Iraqi forces. On 8 August 2014, an MQ-1 Predator fired a missile at a militant mortar position. From the beginning of Operation Inherent Resolve to January 2016, five USAF Predators were lost; four crashed from technical failures in Iraq, one in June 2015, two in October 2015, and one in January 2016.

=== Yemen ===
On 3 November 2002, a Hellfire missile was fired at a car in Yemen, killing Qaed Salim Sinan al-Harethi, an al-Qaeda leader thought to be responsible for the USS Cole bombing. It was the first direct U.S. strike in the war on terrorism outside Afghanistan.

In 2004, the Australian Broadcasting Corporation's (ABC-TV) international affairs program Foreign Correspondent investigated this targeted killing and the involvement of the then U.S. Ambassador as part of a special report titled "The Yemen Option". The report also examined the evolving tactics and countermeasures in dealing with Al Qaeda inspired attacks.

On 30 September 2011, a Hellfire fired from an American UAV killed Anwar al-Awlaki, an American-citizen cleric and Al Qaeda leader, in Yemen. Also killed was Samir Khan, an American born in Saudi Arabia, who was editor of al-Qaeda's English-language webzine, Inspire.

On 14 February 2017, a United Arab Emirates UAV MQ-1B was shot down by Houthi anti-aircraft missile over Marib province.

On 14 May 2019, a United Arab Emirates MQ-1 Predator was shot down by Houthi fire during a night flight in Saana, Houthi fighters used an air-to-air missile (R-27T or R-73) with a modified land operator device.

On 25 February 2022, Houthi forces shot down a UAEAF MQ-1 drone of the Saudi led Coalition in Al-Jawf province. Publishing footage of the drone wreck and photos.

=== Libya ===
U.S. Air Force MQ-1B Predators have been involved in reconnaissance and strike sorties in Operation Unified Protector. An MQ-1B fired its first Hellfire missile in the conflict on 23 April 2011, striking a BM-21 Grad. There are also some suggestions that a Predator was involved in the final attack against Gaddafi.

Predators returned to Libya in 2012, after the attack that killed the US Ambassador in Benghazi. MQ-9 Reapers were also deployed.

=== Somalia ===
On 7 March 2016, US Predator drones attacked an al-Shabaab training camp south of Kismayo. Ibrahim al-Afghani, a senior al-Shabaab leader was rumored to be killed in the strike.

Four al-Shabaab fighters, including a Kenyan, were killed in a drone strike late February 2012.

=== Iran ===
On 1 November 2012, two Iranian Sukhoi Su-25 attack aircraft engaged an unarmed Predator conducting routine surveillance over the Persian Gulf just before 05:00 EST. The Su-25s made two passes at the drone firing their 30 mm cannon; the Predator was not hit and returned to base. The incident was not revealed publicly until 8 November. The U.S. stated that the Predator was over international waters, 16 miles (26 km) away from Iran and never entered its airspace. Iran states that the drone entered Iran's airspace and that its aircraft fired warning shots to drive it away.

On 12 March 2013, an Iranian F-4 Phantom pursued an MQ-1 flying over the Persian Gulf. The unarmed reconnoitering Predator was approached by the F-4, coming within 16 miles of the UAV. Two U.S. fighters were escorting the Predator and verbally warned the jet, which made the Iranian F-4 break off. All American aircraft remained over international waters. An earlier statement by the Pentagon that the escorting planes fired a flare to warn the Iranian jet was later amended. The Air Force later revealed that the American jet that forced the Iranian F-4 to break off was an F-22 Raptor.

On 31 May 2026, Iranian forces shot down an MQ-1 Predator drone over the Persian Gulf.

On 8 September 2026, Iranian forces shot down an MQ-1 Predator drone over the Persian Gulf. Reports on 15 September 2026 indicated that Iran’s Islamic Revolutionary Guard Corps said it shot down two more U.S.-operated MQ-1 drones over the Strait of Hormuz.

=== Syria ===
Armed MQ-1s are used in Operation Inherent Resolve against IS over Syria and Iraq. On 17 March 2015, a US MQ-1 was shot down by a Syrian government S-125 SAM battery when it overflew the port of Latakia, a region not involved in the international military operation.

=== Philippines ===
A 2012 New York Times article claimed that U.S. forces used a Predator drone to try and kill Indonesian terrorist Umar Patek in the Philippines in 2006. The Philippines' military denied this action took place, however. It was reported that a drone was responsible for killing al-Qaeda operative Zulkifli bin Hir on Jolo island on 2 February 2012. The strike reportedly killed 15 Abu Sayyaf operatives. The Philippines stated the strike was executed by manned North American / Rockwell OV-10 Bronco aircraft with assistance from the U.S.

=== Other users ===
The Predator has also been used by the Italian Air Force. A contract for 6 version A Predators (later upgraded to A+) was signed in July 2002 and delivery begun in December 2004. It was used in these missions:

- Iraq, Tallil: from January 2005 to November 2006 for "Antica Babilonia" mission (1.600 hours flew)
- Afghanistan, Herat: from June 2007 to January 2014 (beginning with Predator A, then A+ and finally replaced by MQ-9 Reaper). Flew 6.000 hours in 750 missions only from June 2007 to May 2011.
- Djibouti: 2 x Predator A+, since 6 August 2014 for support Atalanta EU mission – counter piracy – and for EUTM mission in Somalia (first mission flew 9 August 2014; detachment of about 70 Italian air force airmen)

Two civil-registered unarmed MQ-1s have been operated by the Office of the National Security Advisor in the Philippines since 2006.

The Predator has been licensed for sale to Egypt, Morocco, Saudi Arabia, and UAE.

== Variants ==
RQ-1 series

- RQ-1A: Pre-production designation for the Predator system – four aircraft, Ground Control Station (GCS), and Predator Primary Satellite Link (PPSL).
  - RQ-1K: Pre-production designation for individual airframe.
- RQ-1B: Production designation for the Predator UAV system.
  - RQ-1L: Production designation for individual airframe.

MQ-1 series
The M designation differentiates Predator airframes capable of carrying and deploying ordnance.

- MQ-1A Predator: Early airframes capable of carrying ordnance (AGM-114 Hellfire ATGM or AIM-92 Stinger). Nose-mounted AN/ZPQ-1 Synthetic Aperture Radar removed.
- MQ-1B Predator: Later airframes capable of carrying ordnance. Modified antenna fit, including introduction of spine-mounted VHF fin. Enlarged dorsal and ventral air intakes for Rotax engine.
  - MQ-1B Block 10 / 15: Current production aircraft include updated avionics, datalinks, and countermeasures, modified v-tail planes to avoid damage from ordnance deployment, upgraded AN/AAS-52 Multi-Spectral Targeting System, wing deicing equipment, secondary daylight and infrared cameras in the nose for pilot visual in case of main sensor malfunction, and a 3 ft (0.91 m) wing extension from each wingtip. Some older MQ-1A aircraft have been partially retrofitted with some Block 10 / 15 features, primarily avionics and the modified tail planes.

Predator XP
Export variant of the Predator designed specifically to be unable to carry weapons to allow for wider exportation opportunities. Markets for it are expected in the Middle East and Latin America. First flight on 27 June 2014. Features winglets with an endurance of 35 hours and a service ceiling of 25,000 ft (7,600 m). Is equipped with the Lynx synthetic aperture radar, may contain laser rangefinder and laser designator for target illumination for other aircraft.

MQ-1C

MQ-1C 25M

General Atomics MQ-1C 25M Gray Eagle The “M” in 25M refers to “Modernized,” including open architecture ground and aerial systems, advanced datalinks, and an improved propulsion system. This dramatically improves the capacity for developing new capabilities, supplying electronic threat resistance, and delivering expeditionary employment to remote areas

The U.S. Army selected the MQ-1C Warrior as the winner of the Extended-Range Multi-Purpose UAV competition August 2005. The aircraft became operational in 2009 as the MQ-1C Gray Eagle.

NMQ-1B

Ex air force MQ-1 Predator modified for weapons and sensors testing.

== Operators ==
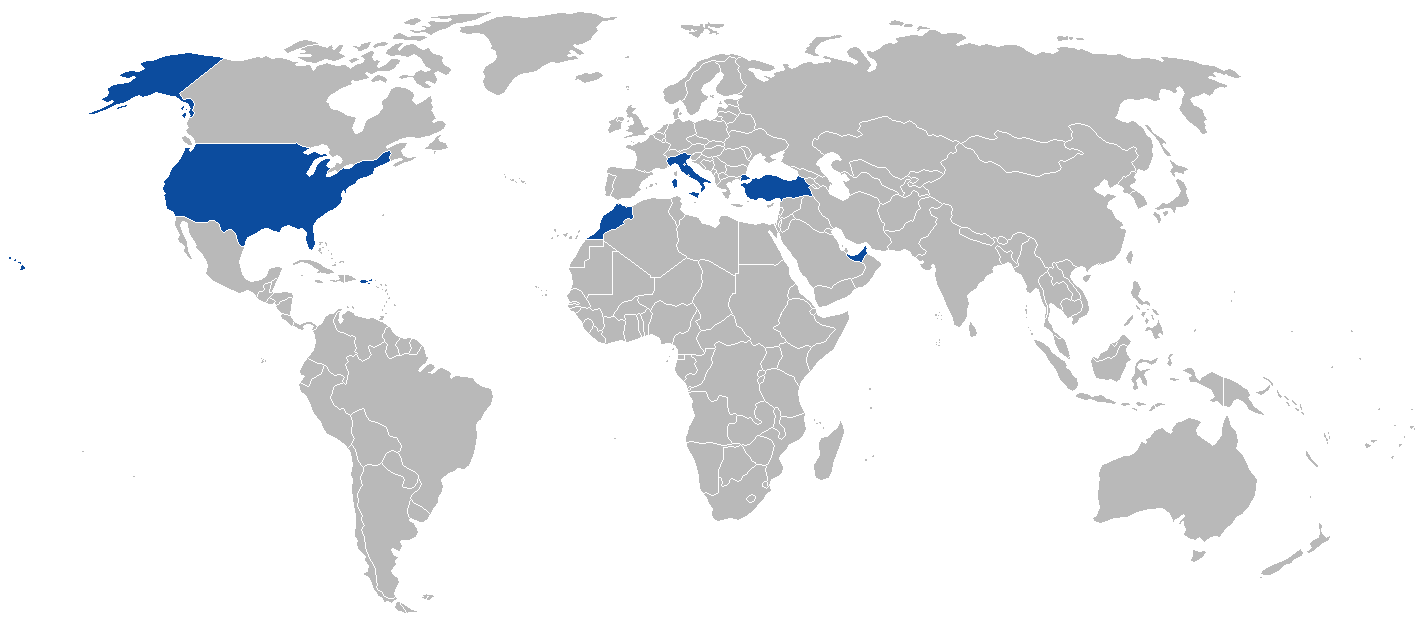
Operators of the aircraft.

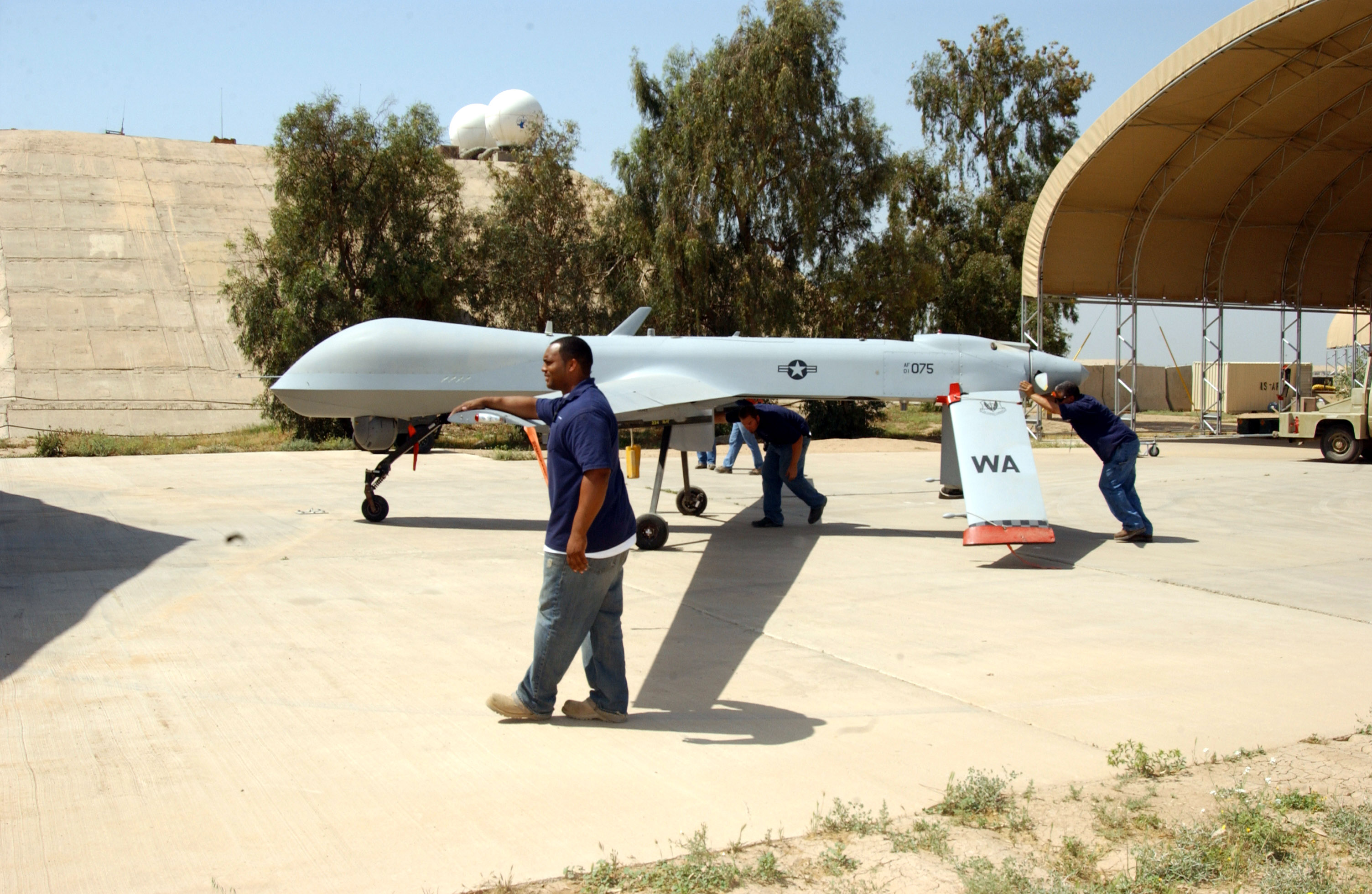
Three contract maintainers walk an RQ-1 into a shelter at Balad Air Base, Iraq in 2006.

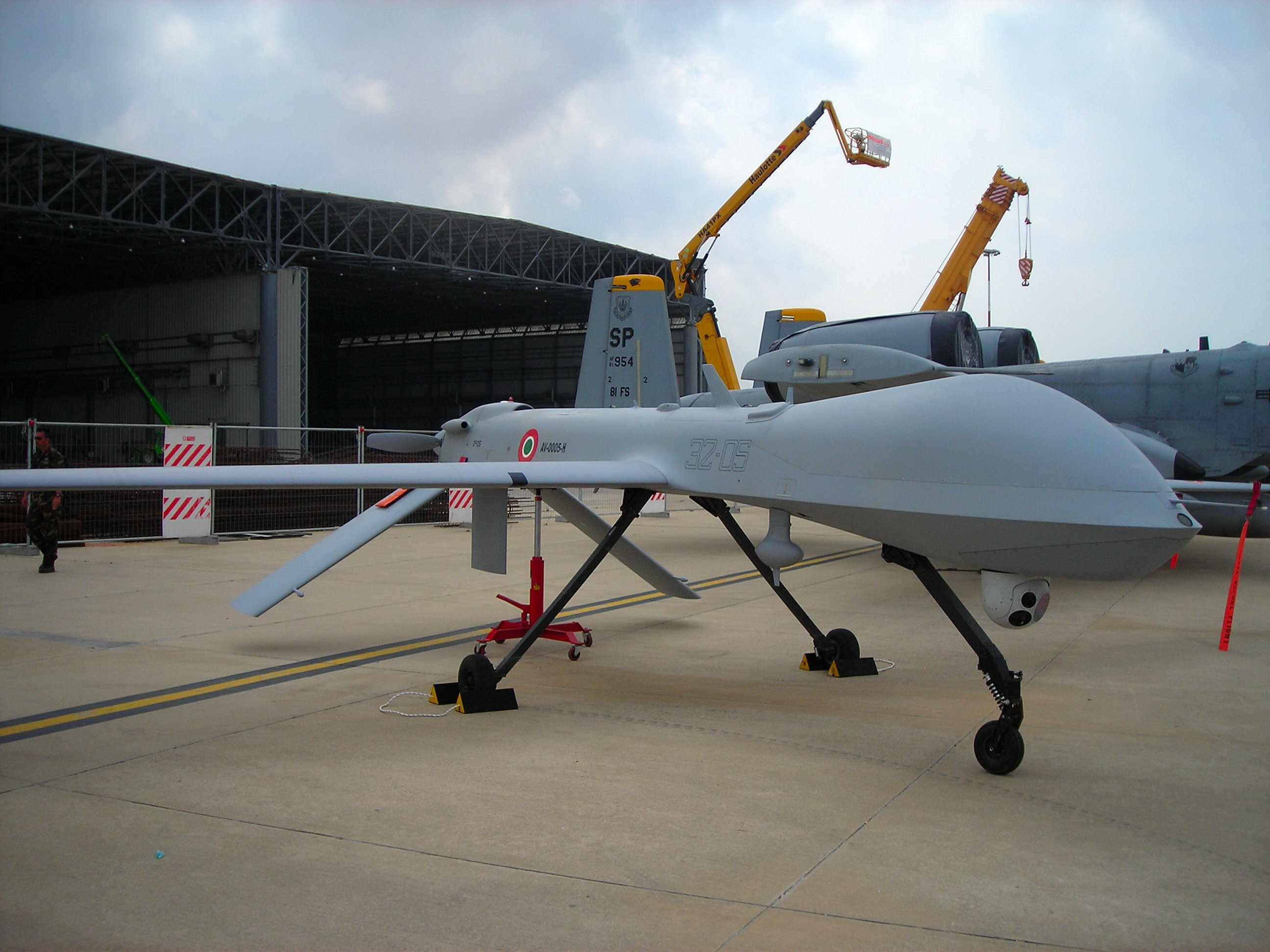
RQ-1 Predator of the Italian Air Force

Morocco

- Royal Moroccan Air Force received four Predator A aircraft.

United Arab Emirates

- United Arab Emirates Air Force signed a US$197 million deal in February 2013 for an unspecified number of Predators, XP version, marking its first sale. One system of four aircraft is planned to begin delivery in mid-2016. General Atomics stated on 16 February 2017 that it finished deliveries, declining comment on the number delivered.

United States

- United States Navy Naval Air Warfare Center Weapon Division received 20 ex air force MQ-1 Predator and modified them. The modified aircraft are designated as NMQ1B.

=== Former operators ===
Italy

- Italian Air Force retired on 19 December 2022.
  - 32° Stormo (32nd Wing) Armando Boetto—Foggia, Amendola Air Force Base
    - 28° Gruppo (28th Unmanned Aerial Vehicle Squadron)
    - 61° Gruppo (61st Unmanned Aerial Vehicle Squadron)

United Kingdom

- Royal Air Force
  - Creech Air Force Base, Nevada
    - No. 1115 Flight (2004–2007)
    - No. 39 Squadron (2007–20??)

United States

- United States Air Force officially retired the Predator in 2018. One MQ-1B was still active as of 2023.
  - 11th Reconnaissance Squadron (operated MQ-1s during Nomad Vigil)
- U.S. Army (RQ-1)
- U.S. Customs and Border Protection
- Central Intelligence Agency
  - Special Operations Group in Langley, VA

== Aircraft on display ==
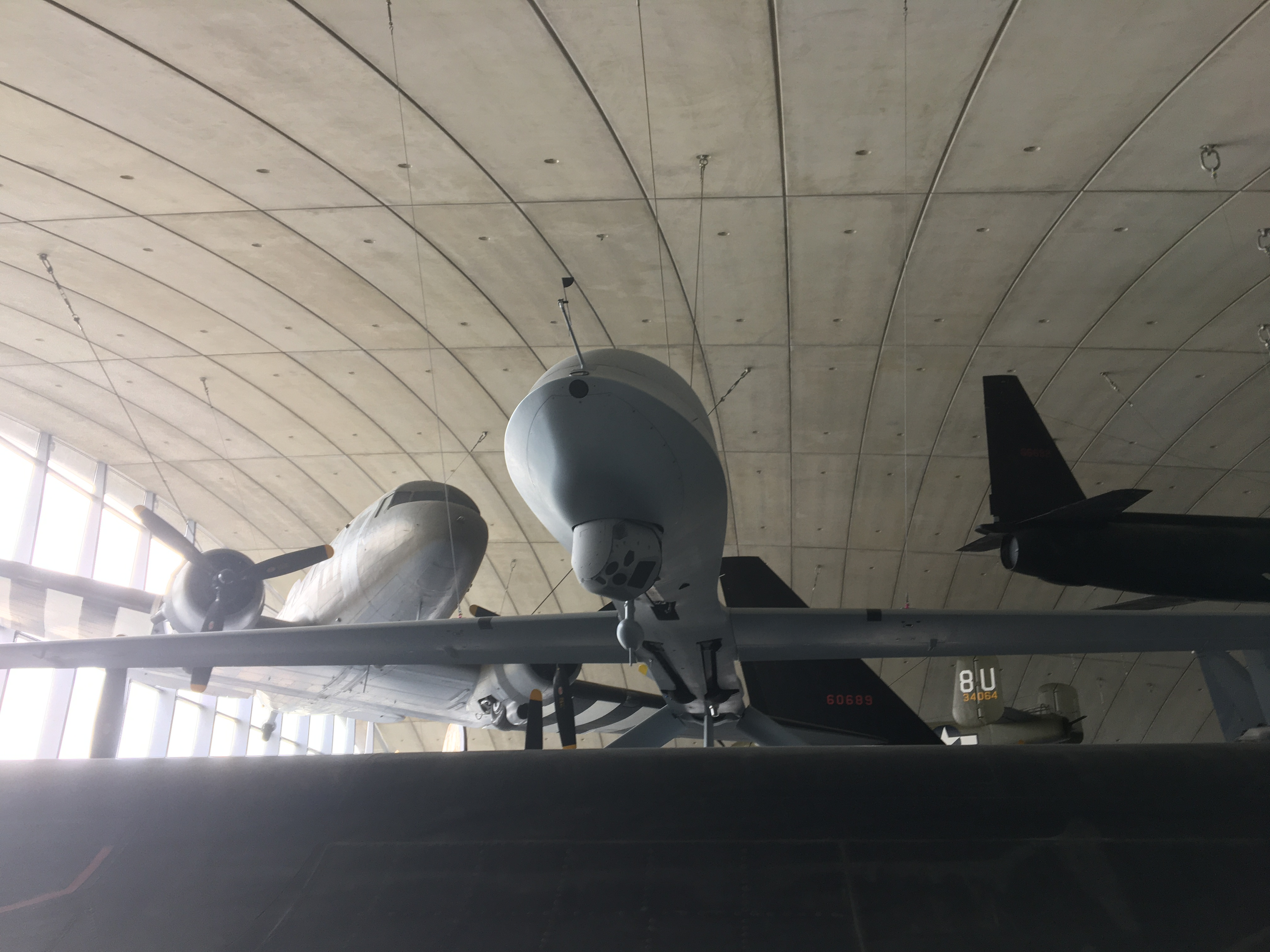
MQ-1B 03-3120 on display at the American Air Museum, IWM Duxford

=== Serbia ===
- 95-3019 – RQ-1K on static display at the Aeronautical Museum Belgrade in Belgrade.
- 95-3021 – RQ-1K on static display at the Aeronautical Museum Belgrade in Belgrade. It was lost during Operation Allied Force.

=== United Kingdom ===
- 03-3119 – MQ-1B on static display at the Royal Air Force Museum London in London.
- 03-3120 – MQ-1B on static display at the American Air Museum at IWM Duxford in Duxford, Cambridgeshire. It was formerly operated by the 432nd Wing of Creech Air Force Base.

=== United States ===
- 94-3009 – RQ-1K on static display at the National Museum of the United States Air Force in Dayton, Ohio.
- 95-3013 – RQ-1K on static display at Goodfellow Air Force Base in San Angelo, Texas. Tail 13 was formerly deployed in support of Operation Allied Force; it is noted for having been presumed lost on a mission due to loss of communications only to reappear at its base six hours later, allowing its crew to recover it.
- 95-3018 – RQ-1K is on static display at the San Diego Air & Space Museum in San Diego, California.
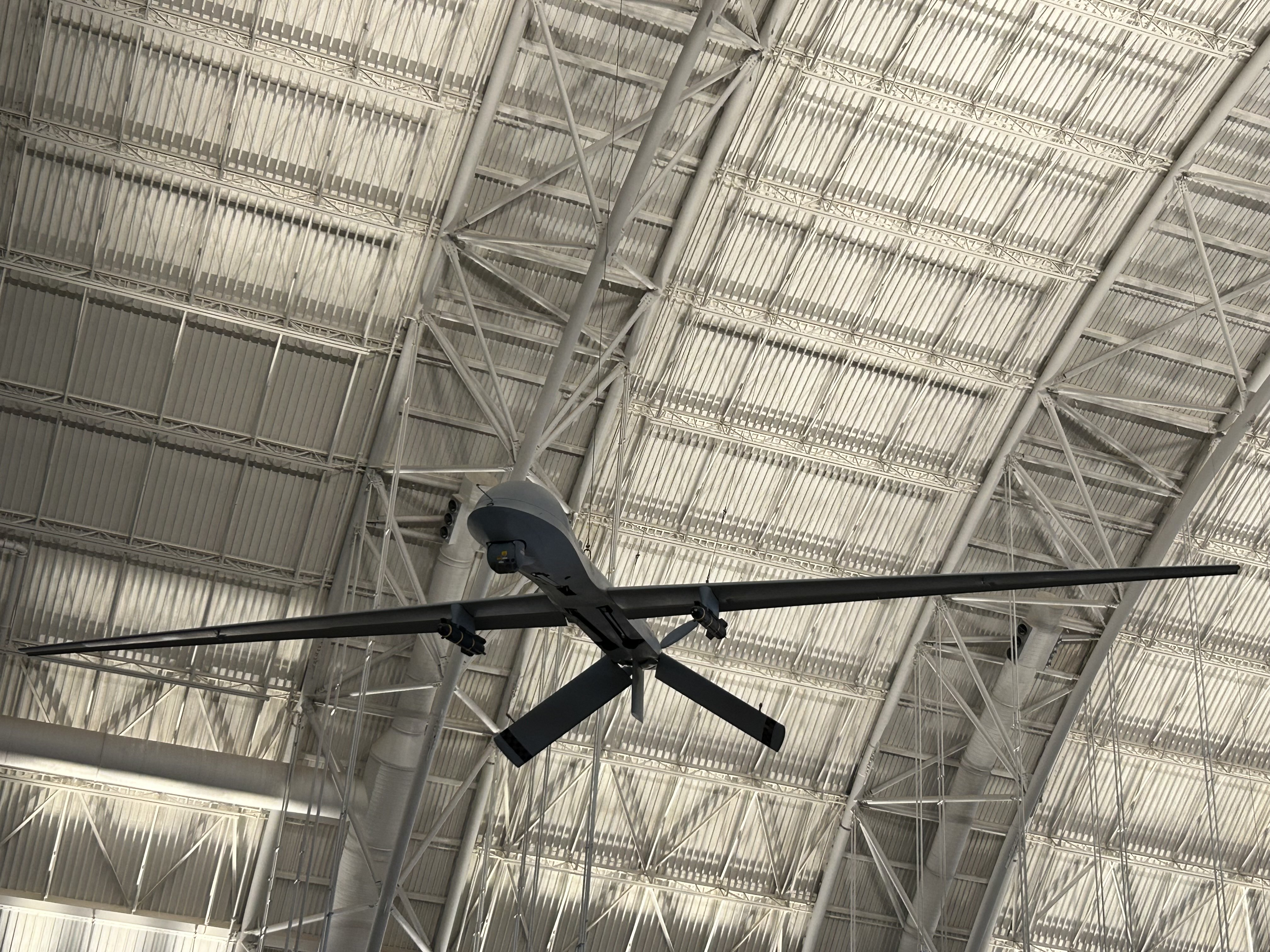
- MQ-1 97-3034 on display at Steven F. Udvar-Hazy Center (2024)
  97-3034 – MQ-1L on static display at the Steven F. Udvar-Hazy Center of the National Air and Space Museum in Chantilly, Virginia. It was the first Predator to launch a Hellfire missile as well as the first to do so operationally.
- 00-3067 – MQ-1B on static display at the Pima Air & Space Museum in Tucson, Arizona.
- 00-3069 – MQ-1B is on static display at the Hiller Aviation Museum in San Carlos, California.
- 03-3116 – MQ-1B on static display at the Hill Aerospace Museum in Roy, Utah.
- 05-3138 – MQ-1B on static display at the Aviation Unmanned Vehicle Museum in Caddo Mills, Texas.
- 05-3144 – MQ-1B on static display at the March Field Air Museum in Riverside, California.
- 07-3185 – MQ-1B on static display at the Lone Star Flight Museum in Houston, Texas.
- An MQ-1 is on static display at the Fargo Air Museum in Fargo, North Dakota.
- An MQ-1 is on static display at the Palm Springs Air Museum in Palm Springs, California.

== Specifications ==
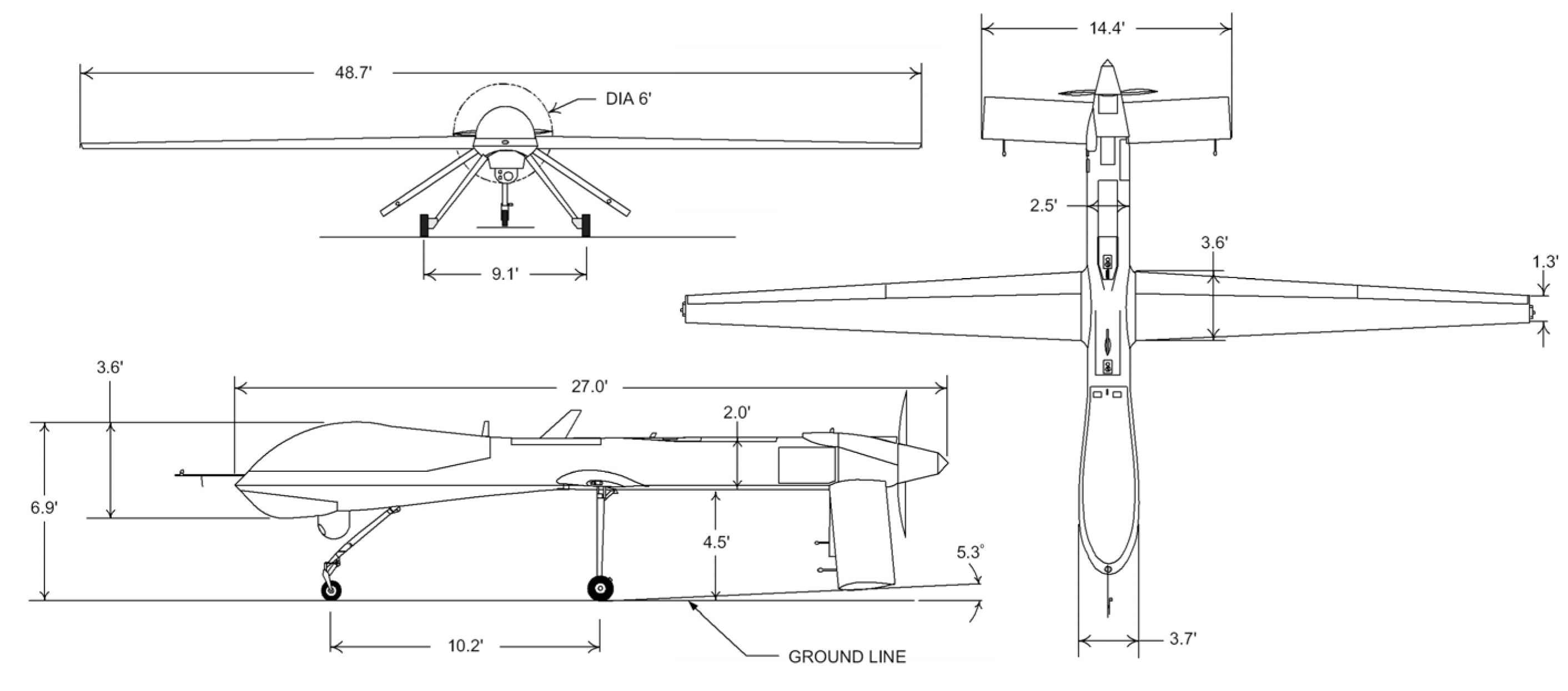
RQ-1B Predator 3-view drawing

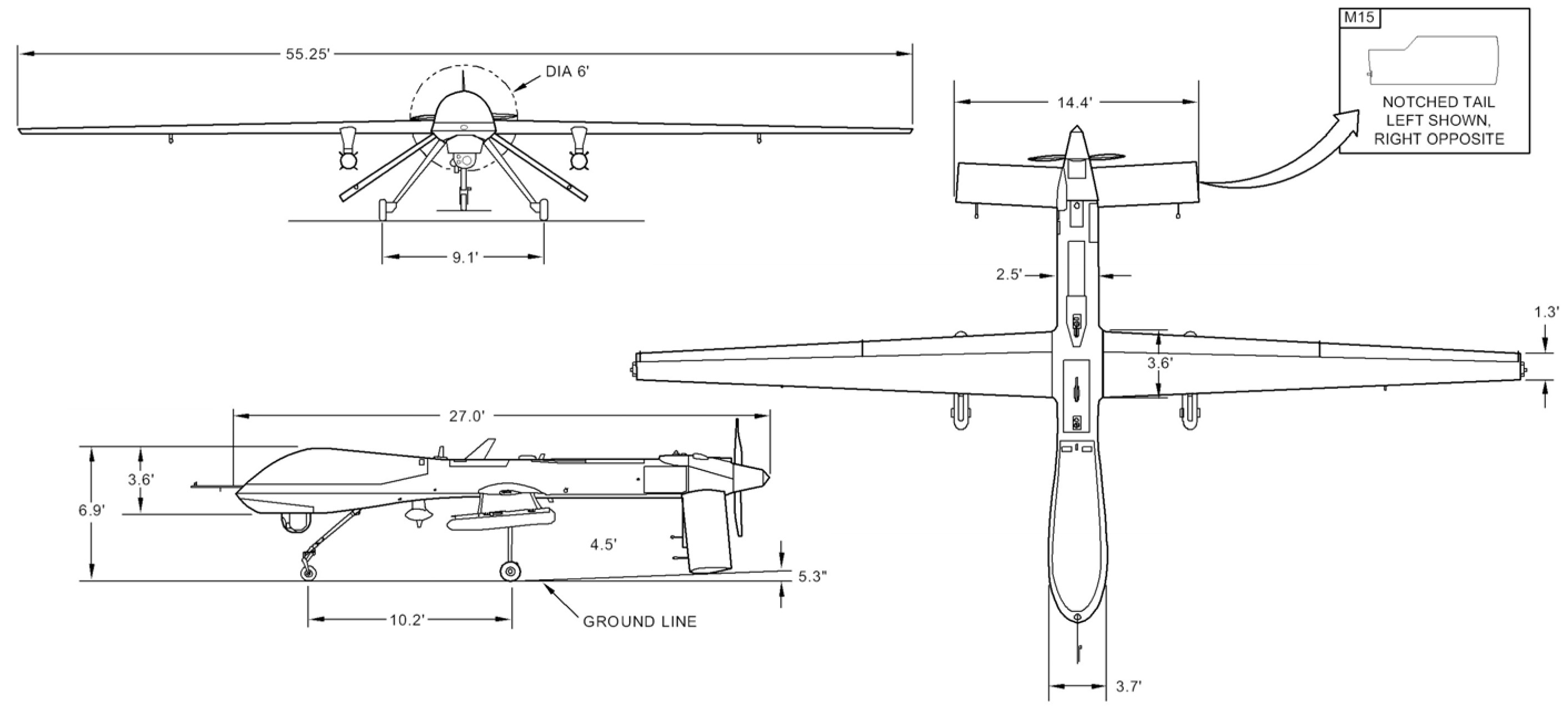
MQ-1B Predator 3-view drawing

Data from USAF MQ-1B fact sheet

General characteristics

- Crew: 0, 3 on ground out of theater (remote pilot, sensor operator, and intelligence analyst), with in-theater ground handling crew
- Length: 27 ft 0 in (8.23 m)
- Wingspan: 48 ft 7 in (14.8 m) MQ-1B Block 10/15: 55.2 ft (16.84 m)
- Height: 6 ft 11 in (2.1 m)
- Wing area: 123.3 sq ft (11.45 m^{2})
- Aspect ratio: 19
- Empty weight: 1,130 lb (513 kg)
- Gross weight: 2,249 lb (1,020 kg)
- Fuel capacity: 851 lb (387 kg)
- Powerplant: 1 × Rotax 914F 4-cylinder air-cooled turbocharged horizontally-opposed piston engine, 115 hp (86 kW)
- Propellers: 2-bladed constant-speed pusher propeller

Performance

- Maximum speed: 117 kn (135 mph, 217 km/h)
- Cruise speed: 70 kn (81 mph, 130 km/h) to 90 kn (100 mph; 170 km/h)
- Stall speed: 54 kn (62 mph, 100 km/h)
- Range: 675 nmi (777 mi, 1,250 km)
- Endurance: 24 hours
- Service ceiling: 25,000 ft (7,600 m)

Armament

- Hardpoints: 2 , with provisions to carry combinations of:
  - Missiles:
    - 2 × AGM-114 Hellfire (MQ-1B)
    - 4 × Air-to-Air Stinger (ATAS) (MQ-1B)
    - 6 × AGM-176 Griffin air-to-surface missiles

Avionics

- ASIP-1C
- AN/AAS-52 Multi-Spectral Targeting System
- AN/ZPQ-1 synthetic-aperture radar (early airframes only)

== See also ==
- Unmanned combat aerial vehicle
- Lethal autonomous weapon

Related development

- General Atomics ALTUS
- General Atomics Avenger
- General Atomics Gnat
- General Atomics MQ-1C Gray Eagle
- General Atomics MQ-9 Reaper

Aircraft of comparable role, configuration, and era

- CAIG Wing Loong
- Denel Dynamics Bateleur
- DRDO Rustom
- EADS Harfang
- Fotros
- Elbit Hermes 900
- IAI Heron
- Shahed 129
- Bayraktar Tactical UAS
- TAI Anka
- Orion

Related lists

- List of unmanned aerial vehicles
- List of active United States military aircraft
