= Aerial manned-unmanned teaming =

Collaboration of autonomous and human systems

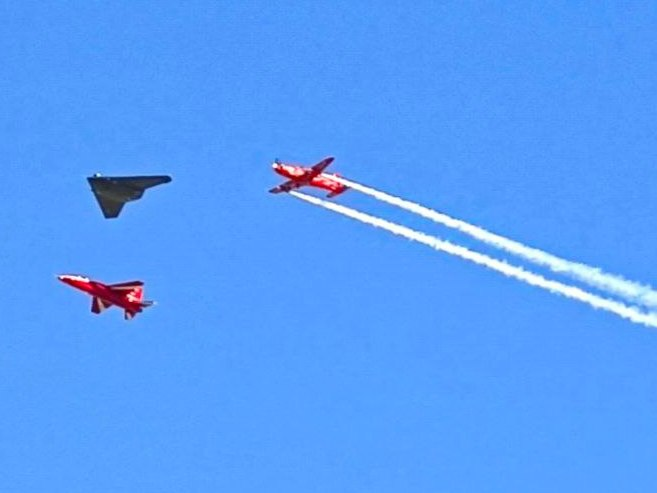
A 2024 photo of a Turkish TAI Anka-3 (middle) loyal wingman capable unmanned combat aerial vehicle and crewed aircraft: a TAI Hürjet (left) and a TAI Hürkuş (right) performing aerial manned-unmanned teaming

The U.S. Marine Corps picked the XQ-58A Valkyrie experimental unmanned combat aerial vehicle for development as a loyal wingman

Aerial manned-unmanned teaming is the collaborative operation of manned and unmanned aircraft systems, typically in military contexts. The human pilot or crew of a manned aircraft controls, coordinates, or supervises one or more autonomous or semi-autonomous loyal wingman drones or unmanned fighter aircraft with loyal wingman capabilities or other types of unmanned combat aerial vehicles (UCAVs) to improve situational awareness, reduce risk, better perform in complex environments, and possibly reduce the need for crewed units.

Examples of the concept include the loyal wingman drone also known as collaborative combat aircraft (CCA). Loyal wingman drones are intended to operate with manned combat aircraft, including sixth-generation fighters, and use an artificial intelligence (AI) (Note: Another AI company acquired Heron Systems, which defeated a human F-16 pilot and 5 other AI companies in the DARPA AlphaDogfight trials 2019-2020.) "autonomy package" to increase its ability to operate without explicit human direction.

== Characteristics ==
=== Conceptualization ===
Unmanned systems, including but not limited to unmanned aerial vehicles (UAV), require remote control, with humans overseeing missions that unmanned systems perform semi- or automated mission segments. With advancements in electronics on both the unmanned system side and the controller side, increased mission autonomy was achieved, including automatic take-off and landing, autonomous mission planning, automatic target recognition, tracking, and engagement. Combined with artificial intelligence and machine learning, human operators gradually reduced their roles in direct control, instead took supervisory roles to approve or deny the machine’s decisions. The operation in which semi-autonomous systems perform specific tasks based on human orders is called Manned-Unmanned Teaming (MUM-T).

The highest autonomy level enables unmanned platforms to operate within integrated manned-unmanned teams, with one operator controlling multiple unmanned platforms, and when human control is unavailable, perform their mission independently. Manned-Unmanned Teaming ensures efficient and economic use of resources on the battlefield. Drone swarm and robotic wingman (loyal wingman) are both envisioned as examples of the Manned-Unmanned Teaming operation.

The United States Army Aviation Center of Excellence defined MUM-T as the "synchronized employment of soldier, manned and unmanned air and ground vehicles, robotics, and sensors to achieve enhanced situational understanding, greater lethality, and improved survivability".

In 2002, NATO STANAG 4586 defined Levels of Interoperability (LOI) for Manned-Unmanned Teaming operation via data links, with Level 1 defining the weakest interoperability and most basic remote controlled system, while Level 5 denoted unmanned aerial vehicles capable of self-launch and recovery. Higher levels of LOI and autonomy are being actively explored by military planners, including ways for a single manned platform to control multiple unmanned systems, enabling AI-assisted formation flight, and controlling fully autonomous unmanned systems via a network.

=== Loyal wingman ===
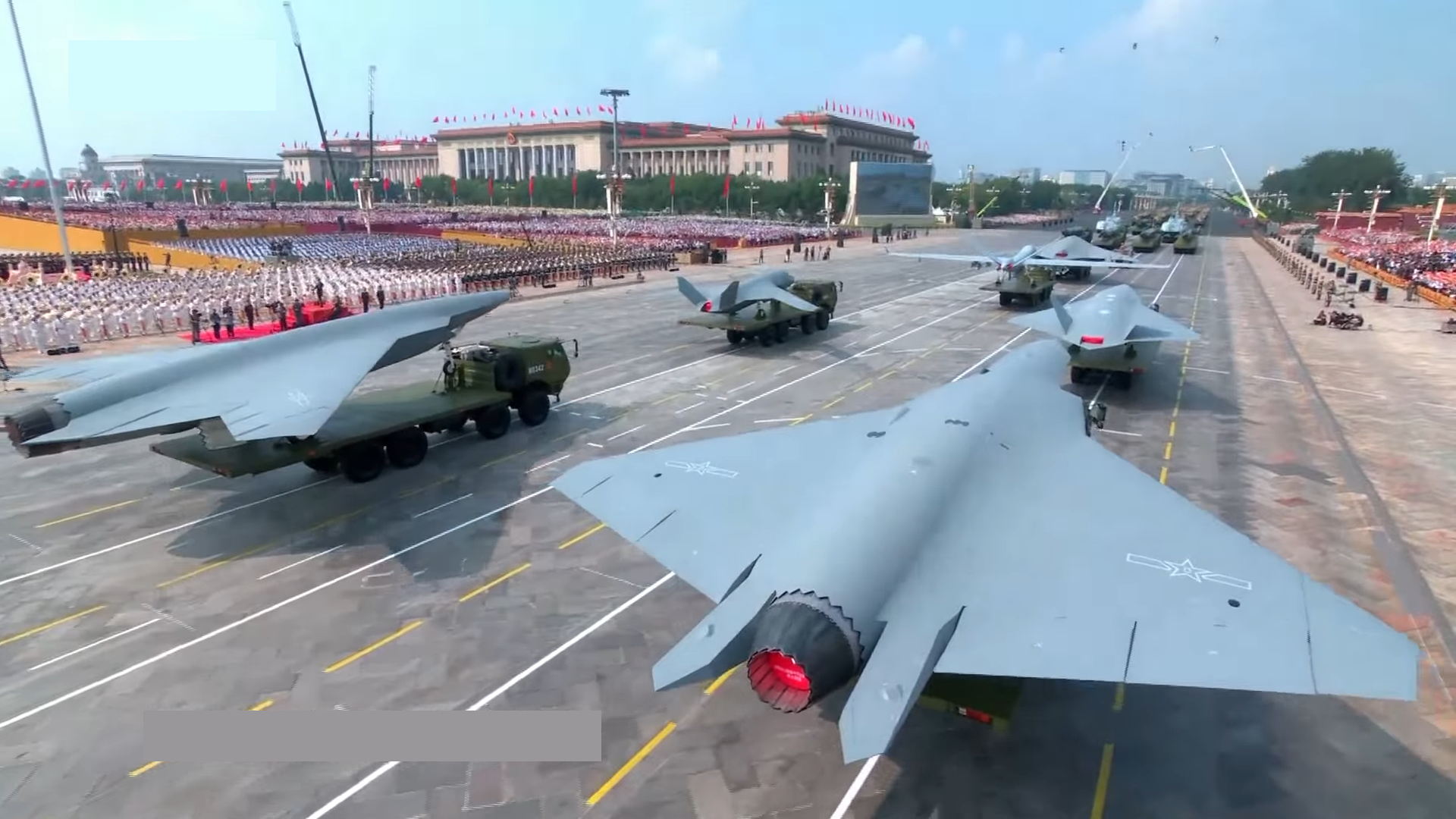
Various UCAV and loyal wingman mockups displayed at the 2025 China Victory Day Parade

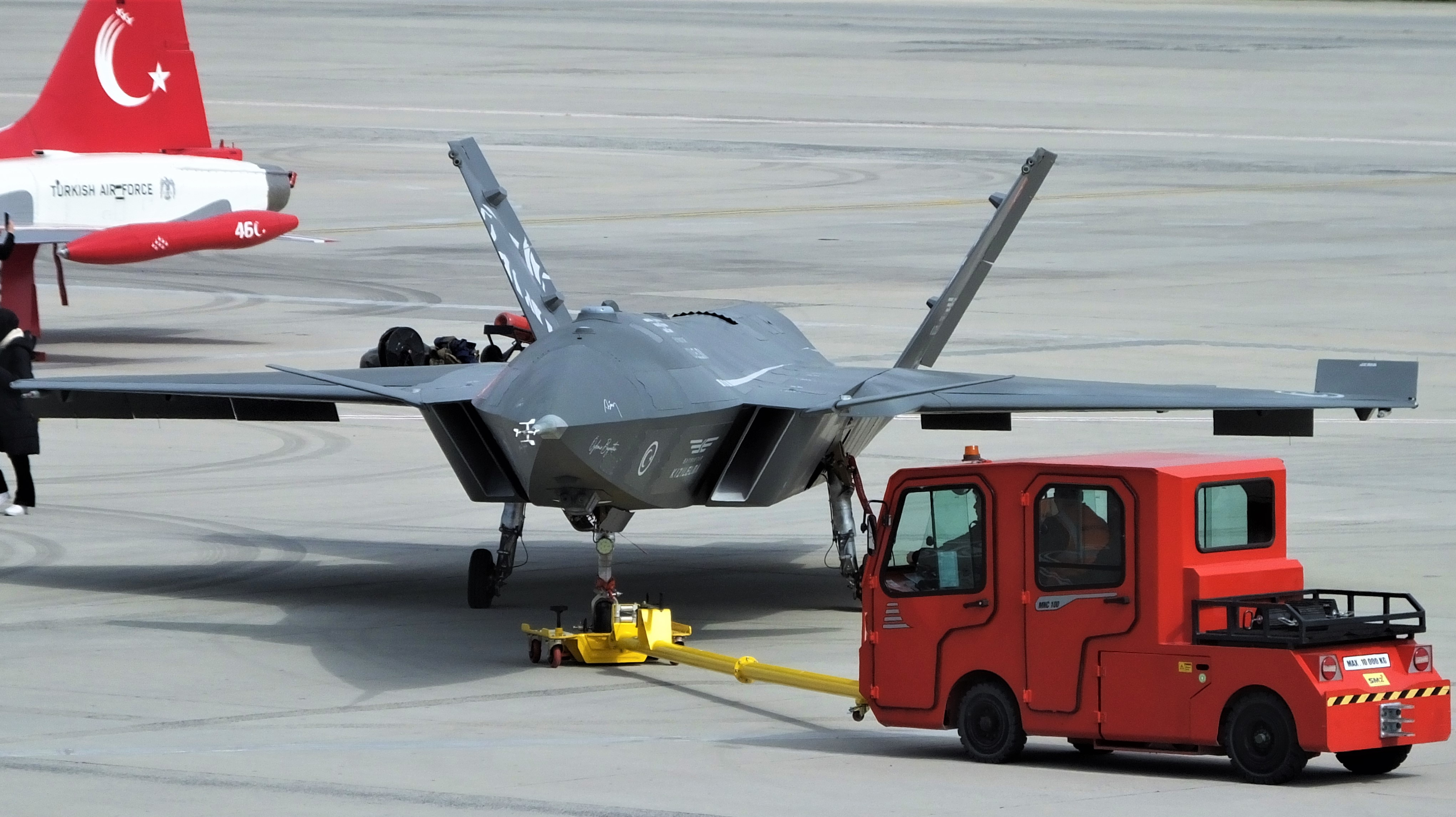
Baykar Kızılelma at Teknofest 2023

The loyal wingman is a military drone with an onboard AI control system and the capability to carry and deliver a significant military weapons load. The AI system is envisaged as being significantly lighter and lower-cost than a human pilot with their associated life support systems, but to offer comparable capability in flying the aircraft and in mission execution.

Some concepts depict a standardized aircraft deployed in two variants: one as a sixth-generation fighter with a human pilot and/or battle commander in the cockpit, and the other as a loyal wingman with an AI system substituted in the same location. BAE Systems envisages the Tempest to be capable of operating in both manned and unmanned configurations.

Another concept is to develop a dedicated, affordable, smaller, and cheaper autonomous wingman that can be integrated into a crewed and uncrewed aircraft team system. The drone, in turn, carries its own munitions. The reduced cost would make the platform attritable and replaceable in case of loss. The Bayraktar Kızılelma and Boeing MQ-28 Ghost Bat are examples of the early explorations of the loyal wingman. On January 8, 2026, The U.S. Marine Corps has officially selected Northrop Grumman and Kratos to develop its first operational "Collaborative Combat Aircraft (CCA)." This announcement marks the transition of the Kratos XQ-58 Valkyrie from an experimental testbed into a loyal wingman aircraft. On 22 June 2026, Turkey's Baykar and Italy's Leonardo tested a system where a manned M-346FA can control and coordinate with a Bayraktar Kızılelma unmanned aircraft. The Kızılelma autonomously took off, joined the M-346, changed formation, separated, and rejoined under the M-346 crew’s direction. The successful test is an important step toward future aerial manned-unmanned teaming using multiple autonomous aircraft.

There is also a Collaborative Combat Aircraft (CCA) program of the United States Air Force (USAF), the Skyborg, that explored a similar theme—autonomous fighters that can work alongside sixth-generation fighters. Both MQ-28 and Kratos XQ-58 Valkyrie were considered options in the early CCA developments. The USAF plans to spend more than $8.9 billion on CCA programs from fiscal years 2025 to 2029.

=== Role ===
The principal application is to elevate the role of human pilots to mission commanders, leaving AIs as "loyal wingmen" to operate under their tactical control as high-skill operators of relatively low-cost robotic craft.

- Tegler, Eric (20 August 2020). "AI Just Won A Series Of Simulated Dogfights Against A Human F-16 Pilot, 5-0. What Does That Mean?". Forbes. Archived from the original on 22 March 2025.
- DARPAtv (20 August 2020). AlphaDogfight Trials Final Event.

Loyal wingmen can perform other missions as well, as "a sensor, as a shooter, as a weapons carrier, as a cost reducer".

Regular unmanned combat aerial vehicle (UCAV) and loyal wingman/CCA are both considered manned-unmanned teaming (MUM-T) capable aircraft; however, a distinguishing difference between them is often made by some defense analysts. CCAs are manned platforms' loyal wingman, providing extended-range strikes, frontline intelligence, and additional layers of protection for manned assets, which requires affordability for ‘combat mass’. The UCAVs are considered higher-performance aircraft that can perform independent operations and 'traditional' roles like that of fighter and strike aircraft. Nevertheless, both CCAs and UCAVs are aimed at having collaborative capabilities.

=== Capabilities ===
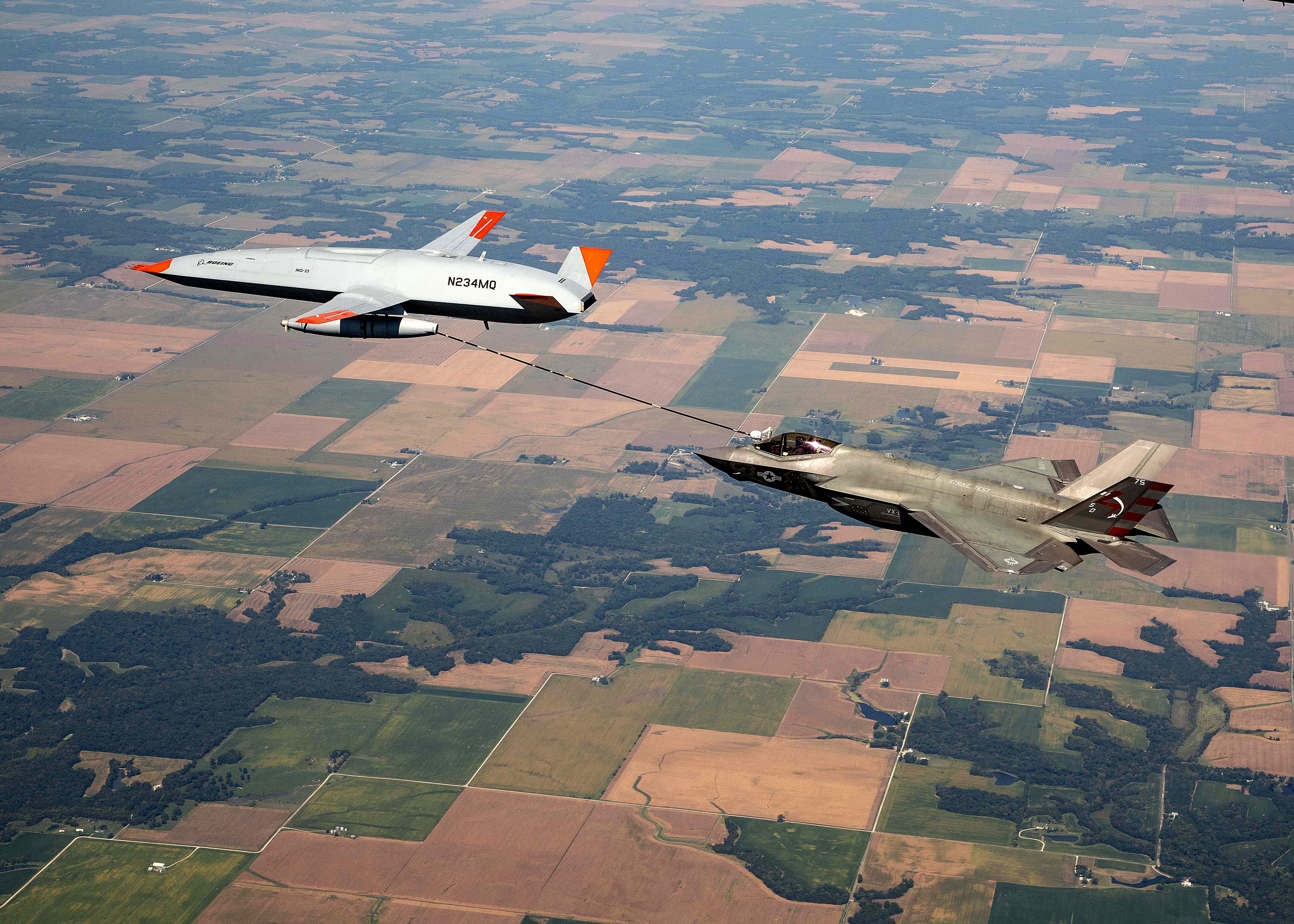
Boeing MQ-25 Stingray T1 test aircraft refuels F-35C, 2021

Despite some reports focusing on the attrition aspect of the CCA, USAF Secretary Frank Kendall later clarified that CCA's focus on the "affordable mass" doesn't mean the platforms are expandable or attritable. Kendall believed CCA should be remotely controlled versions of targeting pods, electronic warfare pods, or weapons carriers to provide additional sensors and munitions; to balance affordability and capability. According to him, the platforms should have sufficient intelligence and onboard defense systems to survive on the battlefield, playing "100 roles":

The price point of a CCA will determine how many types of missions a single airframe can perform, with more expensive designs able to be multirole aircraft, while cheaper designs could be modular to perform different tasks on different days, which can afford to be lost in combat. Two increments are planned: increment 1 CCAs will have sensor and targeting systems to focus on carrying additional munitions for manned aircraft; increment 2 CCAs will have greater stealth and autonomy to perform missions including EW, SEAD, and potentially act as decoys. It's possible that two distinct solutions could emerge from this stage, one high-end and "exquisite" and the other more basic and inexpensive, oriented around a single mission. Service officials started out developing the increment 2 CCA as a high-end, stealthy platform, but wargames showing that large numbers of low-end aircraft would be more effective than small numbers of high-end versions in a simulated Pacific conflict influenced them to rethink their approach.

The USAF is seeking CCAs with greater thrust than the current MQ-28 and the XQ-58.

== History of manned aircraft in aerial manned-unmanned teaming ==
The concept of the loyal wingman arose in the early 2000s and, since then, countries such as Australia, China, Japan, Russia, Turkey, the UK and the US have been researching and developing the necessary design criteria and technologies.

=== Multinational ===
==== Germany and Turkey ====
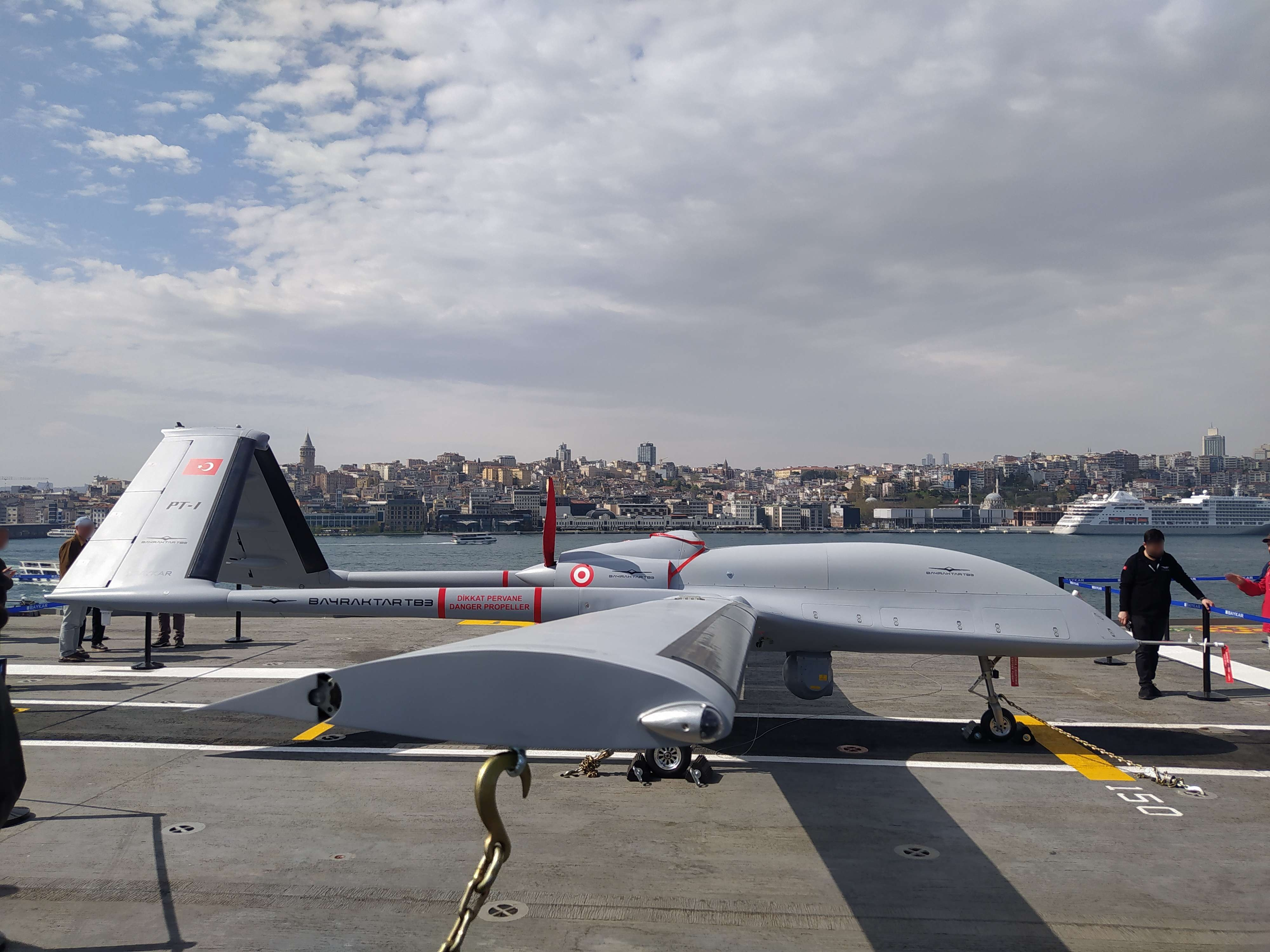
Baykar Bayraktar TB3 UCAV on the deck of TCG Anadolu

On 18 February 2026, a Baykar Bayraktar TB3 unmanned combat aerial vehicle successfully performed a flight demonstration in the Baltic region during NATO's Steadfast Dart 2026 exercise. The drone operated effectively in strong winds, freezing temperatures and heavy snowfall. The drone also successfully hit surface targets at sea with two MAM-L precision-guided munitions. After this, the Bayraktar TB3 also completed an eight-hour joint sortie with multiple Eurofighter Typhoon fighters of the German Air Force in Baltic Sea during the exercise. During this exercise, the Bayraktar TB-3 was launched from the Turkish Naval Forces's TCG Anadolu, the world's first military drone carrier ship, and covered 1,700 kilometers on its mission. The drone also captured aerial video of the Eurofighter Typhoon using its ASELFLIR 500 electro-optical reconnaissance, surveillance and targeting system made by the Turkish company Aselsan. This mission marked a significant integration of unmanned aerial vehicles with advanced fighter jets in a multinational drill with performing manned-unmanned teaming. The operation demonstrated the drone's capability to operate effectively within high-intensity alliance maneuvers.

==== Italy and Turkey ====
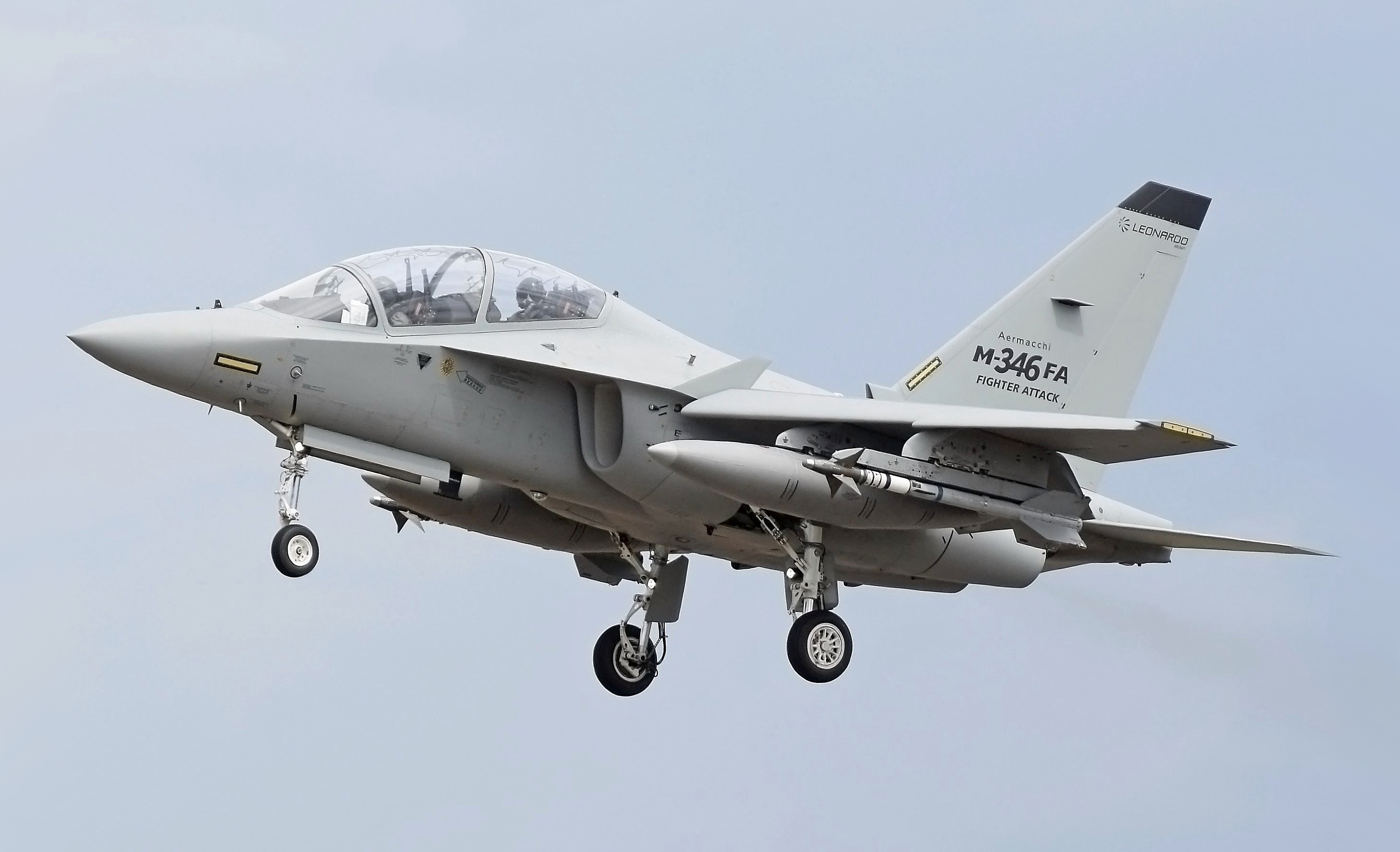
The M-346FA achieved the capability to command the Bayraktar Kızılelma

In May 2026, a Leonardo M-346 and a Bayraktar Kızılelma unmanned fighter aircraft with loyal wingman capabilities completed the first phase of live flight trials under the Leonardo–Baykar K-SWARM programme. During the tests, Kızılelma autonomously rejoined a Leonardo M-346 Master following take-off and conducted formation changes, separations, and rejoins in response to commands from the M-346 crew as part of crewed–uncrewed combat teaming (CUC-T) trials.

=== Turkey ===
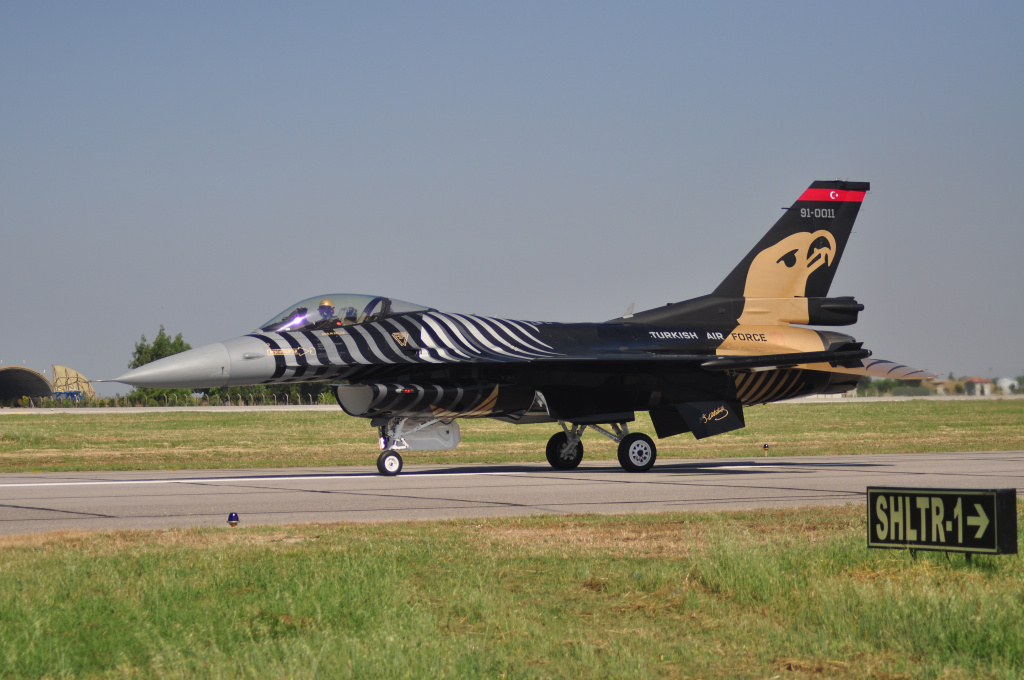
The F-16C of SoloTürk

Manned aircraft of the Turkish Air Force began integrating with unmanned loyal wingmen drone in early 2023. On April 24, 2023, a piloted F-16C fighter jet performed its first close formation flight alongside the Bayraktar Kızılelma unmanned fighter at the AKINCI Flight Training and Test Center in Çorlu. Shortly after, during the TEKNOFEST 2023 aerospace festival in Istanbul (April 27 – May 1), the F-16C of the SoloTürk demonstration aircraft executed daily public formation flights alongside the drone. On May 1, 2023, the final day of the festival, the SOLOTÜRK F-16 was joined by multiple Canadair NF-5 jets from the Turkish Stars aerobatic team to perform a historic fleet-concept formation flight with the Kızılelma. The role of manned aircraft in these tests expanded in November 2025, when one F-16 operated as a close-formation wingman to the Kızılelma, while a second F-16 acted as a hostile target. This allowed the unmanned platform to successfully detect the target F-16 using its own AESA radar and engage it with a simulated air-to-air missile.

Turkey's manned jet platforms have continued to advance their manned-unmanned teaming (MUM-T) capabilities through joint flight operations with indigenous UCAVs. On June 5, 2024, the piloted TAI Hürjet supersonic advanced jet trainer executed a major joint formation flight alongside the stealth flying-wing TAI Anka-3 unmanned aerial vehicle. During this test, which marked the 66th sortie for the Hürjet and the 8th for the unmanned drone, the manned jet ascended to an altitude of 7,000 feet and maintained a speed of 165 knots while flying in close formation for 50 minutes. For the Hürjet and its pilots, this collaborative flight served as a foundational test in developing future combat doctrines, validating how crewed aircraft will eventually command and communicate via data link with loyal wingmen drones. This operational experience paves the way for similar integrated missions involving the manned TAI TF Kaan fifth-generation fighter.

=== Australia ===
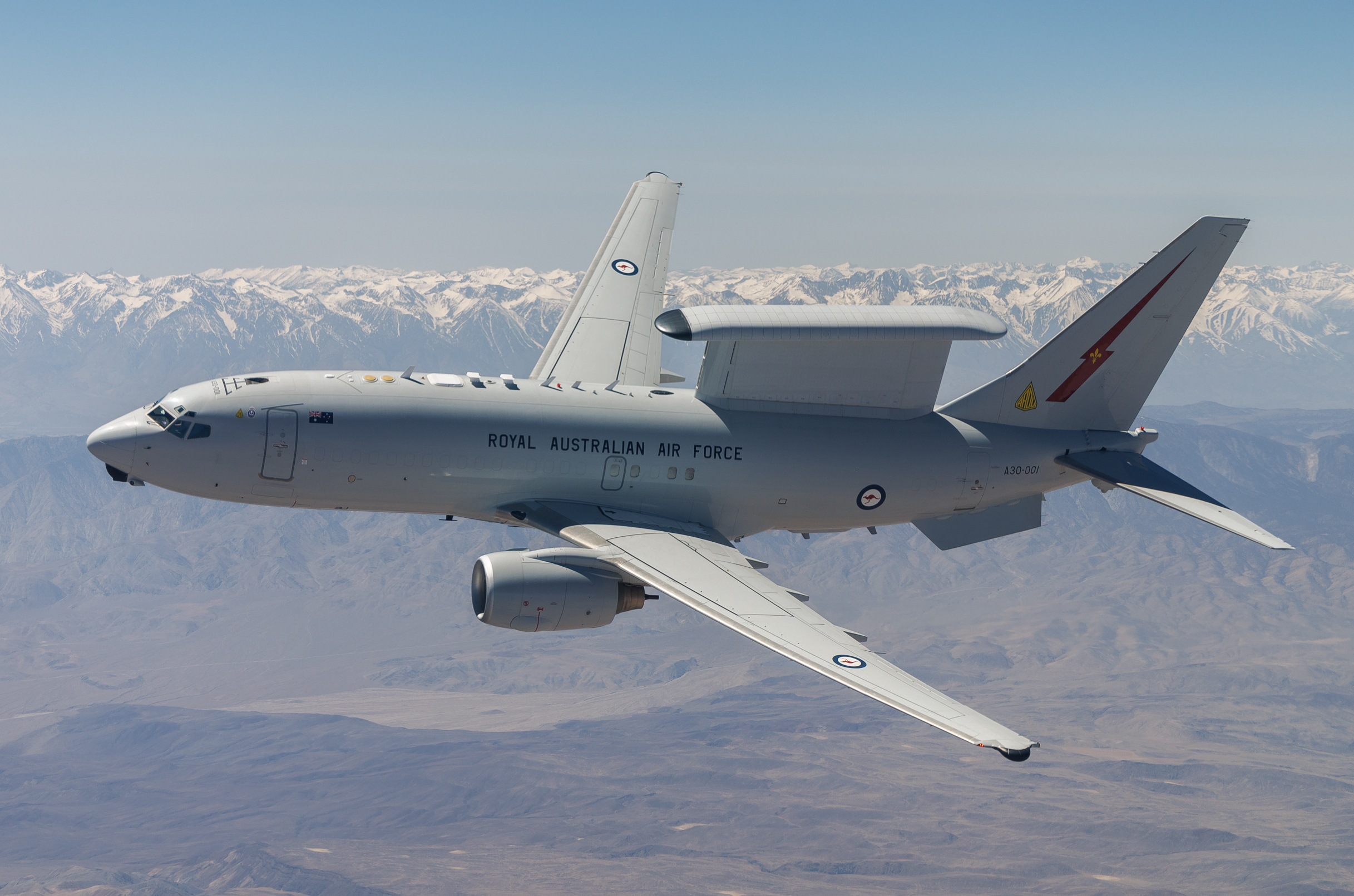
Royal Australian Air Force Boeing E-7A Wedgetail

On 8 December 2025, during a live firing test E-7 Wedgetail and F/A-18F Super Hornet perform aerial manned-unmanned teaming with a Boeing MQ-28 Ghost Bat. The three aircraft participating in the engagement took off from different locations, with the MQ-28 being overseen by an operator aboard the E-7. The MQ-28 and the Super Hornet flew in combat formation during the engagement. Data was shared between the three aircraft, with the Super Hornet identifying and tracking the target drone. The MQ-28 adjusted its course accordingly and was sent authorization from the E-7 to engage the target at an “operationally representative range”. After firing, the MQ-28 provided the AIM-120 AMRAAM with mid-course guidance. According to Colin Miller, General Manager of Boeing Phantom Works, only four major commands were issued by the operator during the test engagement: taking off; performing a combat air patrol; committing to target interception; and giving clearance for the MQ-28 to arm and fire the missile.

=== China ===
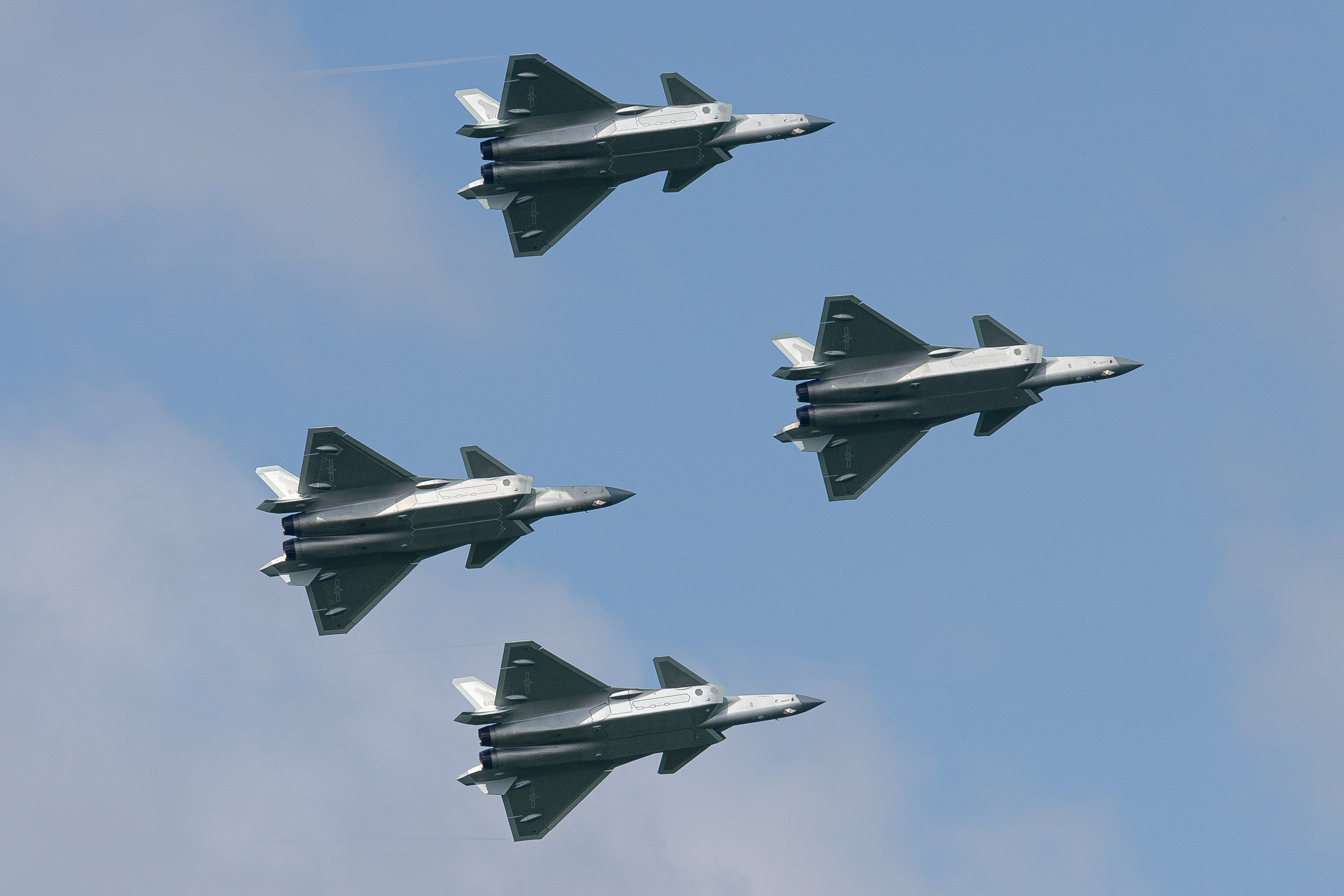
Four J-20 in formation at Changchun Airshow 2023. The J-20S variant is the first dual-seat stealth fighter in the world built to command loyal wingman drones.

China planned to use twin-seat stealth fighters to coordinate unmanned combat aerial vehicle (UCAVs) and "loyal wingman" platforms via networking and datalink. The advantage of a second operator includes the potential for better interpreting and exploiting the enormous sensory data collected by all friendly platforms, which could overload the limited cognitive and processing capacity for a single human, especially in a contested air combat environment. The back-seater operator would focus on managing the manned or unmanned aircraft fleet, reducing the pilot's workload in a contested air combat environment. With increased automation and artificial intelligence in the aircraft system, the two men crew would likely be able to delegate more complex AEW&C tasks, absorb information, and make tactical decisions.The stealth platform could act as a more survivable and distributed alternative to traditional control aircraft, as the stealth allows them to collect data from "loyal wingman" systems and sensors on the frontline.

The development of a twin-seater variant of the Chengdu J-20 was hinted at by its chief designer in 2019. In January 2021, Aviation Industry Corporation of China released computer renderings of the twin-seat variant of the J-20 fighter in celebration of the 10th anniversary of the jet's maiden flight. In February 2021, a South China Morning Post infographic depicted a twin-seat J-20 variant powered by thrust vectoring WS-10C. In October 2021, a taxiing prototype, dubbed J-20S by analysts, was spotted near Chengdu Aircraft Corporation facilities, making J-20S the first-ever two-seat stealth fighter. The J-20S variant is the first dual-seat stealth fighter in the world built to command loyal wingman drones.

In July 2024, USAF Major Joshua Campbell of CASI recommended that the USAF evaluate the concept of twin-seat J-20 fighters for future combat systems. Campbell found merit in China's approach to human-to-machine interaction in an operationally limited (CDO-L) combat environment with information saturation. He believed the twin-seat J-20, with its secondary pilot serving as a control operator for managing collaborative combat aircraft (CCA) and other aircraft in formation, could serve as an inspiration for the F-15EX program and air platforms beyond traditional roles before more advanced AI decision-maker becomes available.

In January 2019, Dr. Wang Haifeng, chief designer of the Chengdu Aircraft Corporation (CAC) announced that China had begun pre-research on a new aircraft, which would include capability to control unmmaned aircraft. Intelligence and rumors indicated the Chinese designs would use tailless flying wing or flying arrowhead configuration that can provide greater broadband stealth characteristics compared to the previous generation of fighters, new propulsion technologies, improved sensors allowing the aircraft to operate alongside Manned-Unmanned Teaming (MUM-T) aircraft or unmanned combat aerial vehicles (UCAVs), etc.

On 26 December 2024, a prototype of the Chengdu J-36 was spotted in China. Based on the available footage, analysts Bill Sweetman, writing for the Australian Strategic Policy Institute, speculated that J-36 could serve as a supercruising launching platform for long-range missiles and a command and control hub for other manned and unmanned aircraft. Justin Bronk of the Royal United Services Institute (RUSI), suggested large crewed aircraft can offer unique strategic advantages for China and the US in the Indo-Pacific region, which has limited forward bases and increasing threats from missiles, drones, and electronic warfare (EW) environment. Bronk argued that while distributed uncrewed systems, such as collaborative combat aircraft (CCA), offer cost-effective combat mass, their reliance on datalinks makes them vulnerable to EW disruption, highlighting the enduring value of crewed aircraft like J-36, which can operate independently in contested environments.

=== United States ===
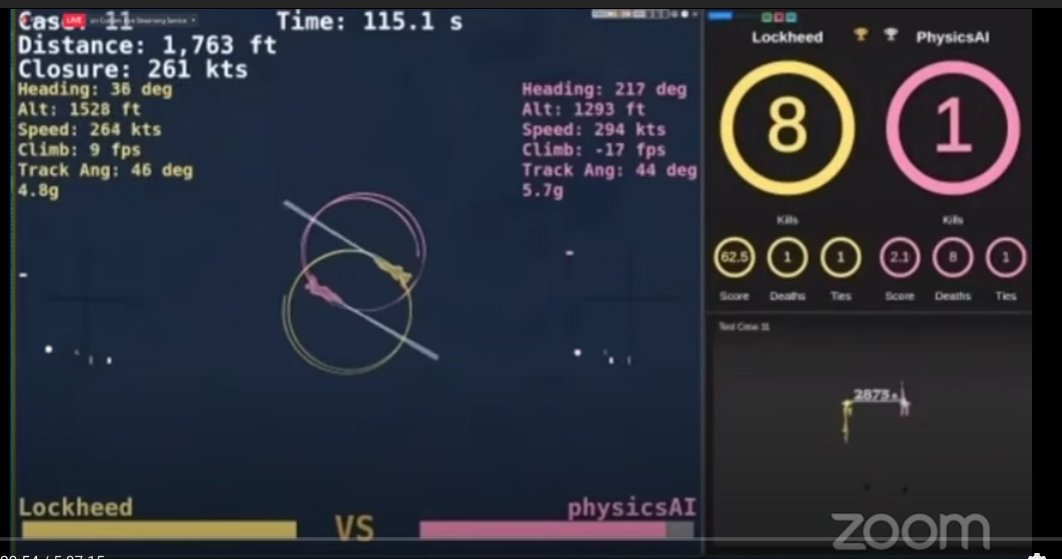
DARPA AlphaDogfight Trials (ADTs), 20 August 2020

The concept of the CCA arose in the early 2000s. CCA programs include the USAF Next Generation Air Dominance (NGAD) program (now Boeing F-47). The US Navy and USAF plan to be able to control the CCAs and NGADs of either service. The CCA is being developed in collaborative fashion by multiple commands of the USAF: MG Heather L. Pringle of the Air Force Research Laboratory (AFRL); MG R. Scott Jobe of Air Combat Command (ACC); LTG Dale R. White, program executive officer (PEO) for fighters and advanced aircraft; and BG Joseph Kunkel, DCS, Plans and Programs. All four generals agreed on the need to put CCAs into the Joint Simulation Environment. (Note: Improved CCA AI will simplify the kill chains. See Deptula and Penney, Mosaic Warfare)

Defense policy expert Heather Penney has identified five key elements for the collaborative development of crewed-uncrewed teaming of autonomous loyal wingmen, remote pilots of unmanned aerial vehicles (UAVs), and pilots flying separately in manned aircraft (also called manned-unmanned teaming).

- Create concepts that will maximize the strengths of both CCA and piloted aircraft working as a team.
- Include operators in CCA development to ensure they understand how they will perform in the battlespace.
- Warfighters must be able to depend on CCA autonomy.
- Warfighters must have assured control over CCA in highly dynamic operations.
- Human workloads must be manageable.

The Autonomous Core System, Skyborg's autonomy package, was shown to be portable across multiple airframes; this has led Skyborg to become a Program of Record with a Program Executive Officer (PEO) for acquisition. Skyborg will continue to serve as a science and technology platform.

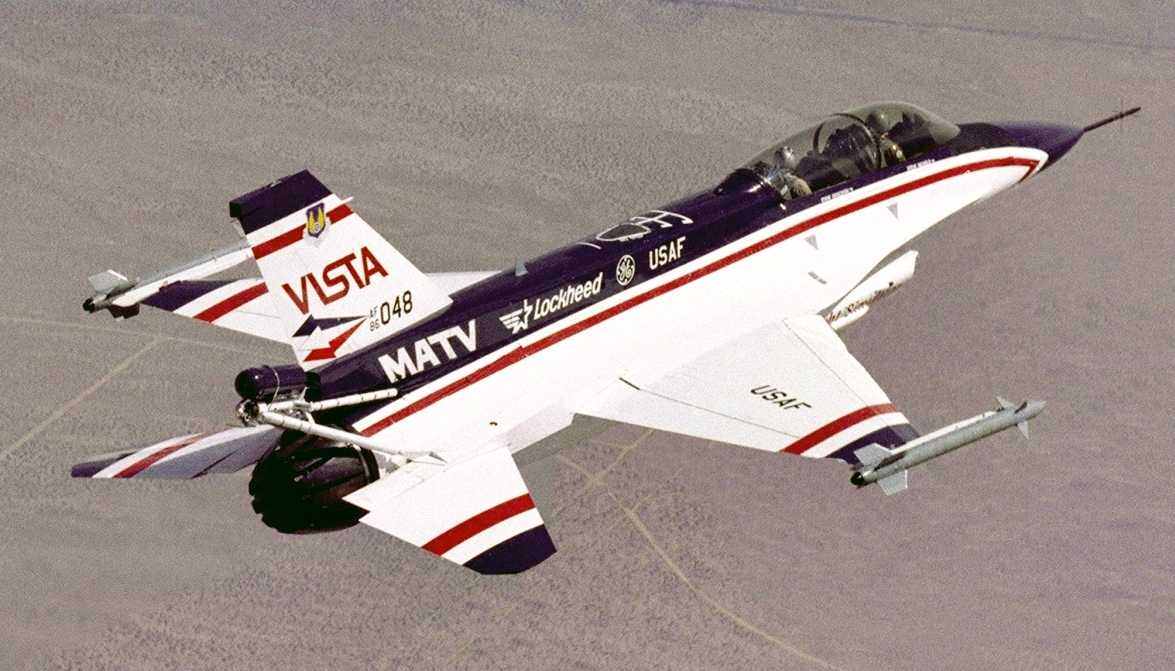
The General Dynamics X-62 VISTA is a modified F-16 which can fly autonomously, with a test pilot to take over if necessary.

Most UAVs are remotely piloted, but an AI program piloting a collaborative combat aircraft would need a mission commander for crewed-uncrewed teaming. —Heather Penney. In 2020, The Defense Advanced Research Projects Agency (DARPA) AlphaDogfight test program established that AI programs that fly fighter aircraft will overmatch human pilots, to the extent that the AI agents even flew with fine motor control. An autonomy package on the VISTA testbed has demonstrated dogfighting capability. US Air Force Secretary Frank Kendall flew in the X-62A VISTA, which was under AI control. The NGAD is anticipated to use loyal wingmen (CCAs). Air Force Secretary Frank Kendall envisions these uncrewed aircraft as performing parts of a larger mission; CCA development can be conducted in parallel with NGAD development, which has to take into account a larger set of requirements. Up to five autonomous CCAs would operate with an NGAD.

Air Force Research Laboratory (AFRL) will test their Skyborg manned-unmanned programs such as Autonomous Air Combat Operations (AACO), and DARPA will test its Air Combat Evolution (ACE) artificial intelligence program. The System for Autonomous Control of Simulation (SACS) software for human interface is being developed by Calspan.

DARPA's Longshot is an air-launched UAV meant to extend the range of a mission and reduce the risk to manned aircraft, which could then remain at standoff range; if Longshot were to use Air Combat Evolution (ACE), missiles launched from that Longshot could more effectively select targets. On March 6, 2023, DARPA chose General Atomics Aeronautical Systems (GA-ASI) to carry out the design of the air-launched Longshot drone through Critical Design Review (CDR); a LongShot would itself carry an AMRAAM or Sidewinder missile, which greatly extends the range of these missiles. In this way, a Boeing F-15EX Eagle II or similar 4th-generation fighter can greatly increase their survivability, when armed with a LongShot. GA-ASI is developing a core package (Gambit) for the CCA market.

On 9 December 2022, the Air Force Test Pilot School tested its General Dynamics X-62 VISTA, a modified F-16 Fighting Falcon which can fly autonomously, with 2 different AI packages. By 16 December 2022 the VISTA had flown eight sorties using ACE, and six sorties using AACO, at a rate of two sorties per day. Six F-16s from Eglin AFB will be fitted with autonomy agents, to establish the foundation of the Collaborative Combat Aircraft (CCA) program. The CCA lines of effort as of March 2023 were:

- Developing the Collaborative combat aircraft platform itself,
- developing the autonomy package that will fly a CCA, and
- figuring out how to organize, train, equip, and supply the CCA program

During the week of October 6 2026, a U.S. Air Force Lockheed Martin F-22 Raptor controlled an Anduril YFQ-44 CCA while both aircraft were in flight, sending it directives which were then carried out by the drone's on-board autonomy software. Following this, on October 26, two FQ-44 drones engaged in beyond-visual-range air to air combat maneuvers directed by on-board autonomy software while being fed high-level directions from a ground controller.

=== Russia ===
A S-70 Okhotnik-B is performing aerial manned-unmanned teaming with a manned fighter

In 2019, a Sukhoi Su-57 flew with a Sukhoi S-70 Okhotnik-B unmanned combat air vehicle. The Sukhoi S-70 is a Russian stealth unmanned combat aerial vehicle (UCAV) with planned royal wingman capability being developed by Sukhoi and Russian Aircraft Corporation MiG. As of 2021, it was projected to act under the control of pilots of Su-57 jets in a potential future version, similar to the USAF Skyborg program. An out of control S-70 was deliberately shot down by a Russian Su-57 over Ukraine in October 2024.

== List of loyal wingman capable drones ==
Examples of Loyal wingman drone include:

- Bayraktar Kizilelma - currently weapon testing
- Boeing MQ-28 Ghost Bat - 8 in testing (Block 1)
- General Dynamics X-62 VISTA - system development aircraft
- HAL CATS Warrior - under development
- Hongdu GJ-11
- TAI Anka-3
- Kronshtadt Grom ("Thunder") - under development
- Spirit Mosquito - program cancelled
- Sukhoi S-70 Okhotnik - proposed development with upgraded avionics
- Airbus Wingman - proposed development
- Northrop Grumman Model 437 - development prototype flying
- GA-ASI Gambit (Note: Off board sensor system (OBSS))
- General Atomics XQ-67
- Kratos XQ-58 Valkyrie
- Skyborg Vanguard program entrants.
- CA-1 Europa
- Anduril FQ-44 Fury

== See also ==
- Index of aviation articles
