= Scaled Composites 437 =

Stealth demonstration aircraft by Scaled Composites

General information
- Type: Experimental aircraft
- National origin: United States
- Manufacturer: Scaled Composites

History
- First flight: 29 August 2024
- Developed from: Scaled Composites 401

The Scaled Composites Model 437 Vanguard is a stealth demonstration aircraft built by Scaled Composites and Northrop Grumman. Based on the Scaled Composites 401 the model 437 includes manual piloting capabilities and an engine change from the Pratt & Whitney Canada JT15D-5D to the more powerful Pratt & Whitney PW535. It intends to explore the role of a low cost jet aircraft, and demonstrate rapid design techniques as part of Northrop's "Digital Pathfinder" program.

It completed its first flight on August 29, 2024, at Mojave Air and Space Port.

== Development ==
The Model 437 first began as a loyal wingman drone in 2021, based on Scaled Composites earlier Model 401. A key aspect of the program was the exploration of an "attritable aircraft", in which aircraft cost is minimized to effectively provide a semi-expendable package, which can be easily replaced. Crucially, an attritable aircraft does not need to perform all functions of a conventional combat aircraft, but rather acts as a force multiplier for another parent aircraft. In line with this, Northrop proposed that the aircraft cost per unit could be as low as $5-6 million USD if the aircraft was put into serial production.

Development on the Model 437 pioneered the Digital Pathfinder project, in which legacy design technologies were replaced with emerging technologies, overhauling the design process to reduce overall cost and time of development whilst necessitating less reworking. As a result, engineering rework was cut down from 15 to 20% to less than 1%, with the time between commencement of design and first flight only 21 months.

As part of the Digital Pathfinder project, Northrop Grumman used plasma arc directed energy disposition in the construction of the wing's titanium structural brackets, the first application on a defense aircraft to fly, whilst reducing the need for hard tooling and improving quality. The use of this process reduced cost by 30 percent compared to traditional methods.

== Specifications ==
Data from

General characteristics

- Crew: 1
- Length: 41 ft (12 m)
- Wingspan: 41 ft (12 m)
- Gross weight: 10,000 lb (4,536 kg)
- Powerplant: × Pratt & Whitney PW535 turbofan, 3,400 lbf (15 kN) thrust

Performance

- Maximum speed: Mach 0.85 (planned)
- Range: 3,000 mi (4,800 km, 2,600 nmi) after envelope expansion
- Service ceiling: 25,000 ft (7,600 m)
- Thrust/weight: 0.34

Armament

- Payload of up to 2000lbs, including 2x AIM-120 AMRAAMs in an internal weapons bay (planned)

== See also ==
Related development

- Scaled Composites 401

Aircraft of comparable role, configuration, and era

- Kratos XQ-58 Valkyrie
- General Atomics XQ-67A
- Boeing MQ-28 Ghost Bat
