= Feihong FH-97 =

Chinese drone prototype

General information
- Type: Unmanned combat aerial vehicle; Loyal wingman
- National origin: China
- Manufacturer: Aerospace Times Feihong Technology Corporation

History
- Manufactured: 2021
- Developed into: Feihong FH-97A

The Feihong FH-97 is a prototype unmanned combat aerial vehicle with stealth capabilities. It was developed as a "loyal wingman" drone, designed to suppress air defenses with electronic countermeasures, fly ahead of aircraft to provide early warning, and absorb damage from attacks, as well as providing reconnaissance and damage evaluation. The FH-97 can also deploy the FH-901 to strike maneuvering targets. It was developed by the Aerospace Times Feihong Technology Corporation under the Ninth Academy of the China Aerospace Science and Technology Corporation, a Chinese state-owned defense and aerospace manufacturer. The FH-97 was first unveiled to the public in 2021 at the China International Aviation & Aerospace Exhibition (Airshow China) in Zhuhai, China.

== Design and development ==
Chief designer and engineer for Aerospace Times Feihong Technology Corporation Deng Shuai has described the "loyal wingman" system used by the FH-97 as "both a sensor and an ammunition depot, as well as an intelligent assistant for pilots." The FH-97 is said to specialise in ground attack while the FH-97A, which was developed from the FH-97, is said to specialise in air-to-air combat.

The FH-97's angular vertical stabiliser and stealth configuration helps to reduce its radar cross-section which enables the FH-97 to be able to operate effectively alongside Chinese stealth aircraft such as the Chengdu J-20.

The FH-97 is also equipped with an Electro-optical targeting system (EOTS) which allows the FH-97 to track targets both on the ground and in the air. Aircraft such as the J-20, J-35, and F-35 are also equipped with EOTS systems. The EOTS system on the FH-97 is equipped under the nose, while the EOTS on the FH-97A is above the nose.

Deng Shuai has said that the FH-97 is capable of connecting to several kinds of in-service aircraft due to its multi-band airborne data link system. At a press conference in Zhuhai, Deng said that "This loyal wingman can build a data link system with different aircraft, and can establish the internal networking of the drone formation and the collaborative networking with manned aircraft. In addition, thanks to the compatibility of the system, there is no need for additional installations and modifications to manned aircraft."

American media has claimed Feihong copied the American XQ-58 Valkyrie despite dissimilarities in size and platform.

== Specifications ==
Data from globalsecurity.org

General characteristics

- Crew: None
- Length: 6 m (19 ft 8 in)
- Wingspan: 12 m (39 ft 4 in)
- Height: 2 m (6 ft 7 in)
- Airfoil: Delta wing configuration
- Max takeoff weight: 3,500 kg (7,716 lb)
- Fuel capacity: 1,000kg (2,204 lb)

Performance

- Maximum speed: Mach 2.5
- Combat range: 2,400 km (1,500 mi, 1,300 nmi)

Armament

- Guns: 1
- Hardpoints: 4
- Missiles:
  - 2 x PL-12 Active Radar Guided Air-to-Air Missiles
  - 2 x CM-502KG Air-to-Surface Anti-Ship Missile
- Bombs:
  - 2 x CM-506KG Precision Guided Bombs
