= General Atomics FQ-42 Vengeance =

Unmanned combat aircraft under development by General Atomics

FQ-42 Vengeance
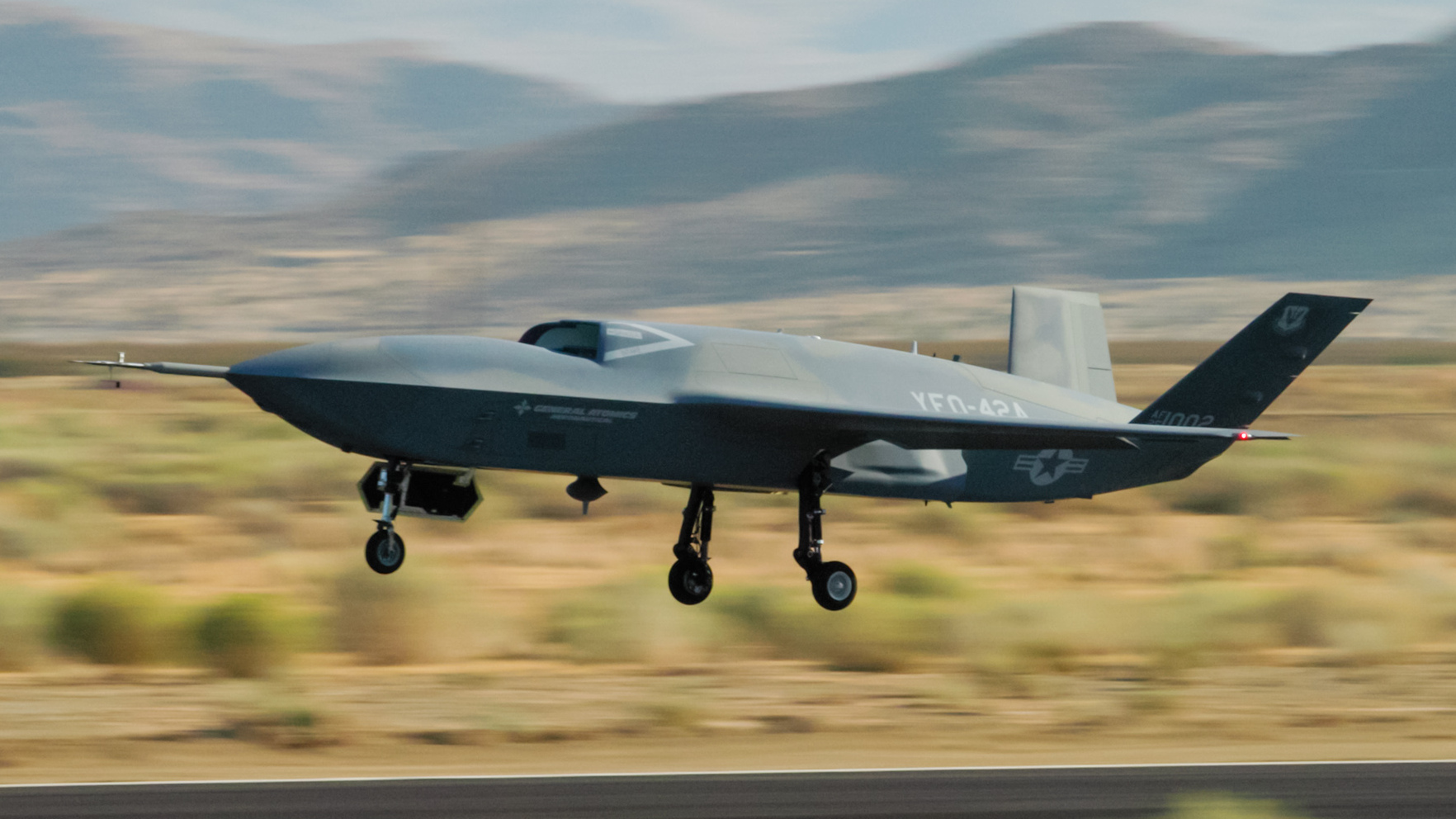
- A YFQ-42A takes off at a testing range in California

General information
- Type: Loyal wingman capable unmanned fighter aircraft
- National origin: United States
- Manufacturer: General Atomics Aeronautical Systems
- Status: Under development
- Primary user: United States Air Force
- Number built: At least 3

History
- First flight: 27 August 2025
- Developed from: General Atomics XQ-67A

The General Atomics FQ-42 Vengeance is an unmanned fighter aircraft with loyal wingman capabilities, currently under development by General Atomics Aeronautical Systems. The aircraft is one of the winning designs for Increment I of the United States Air Force's Collaborative Combat Aircraft (CCA) program and is intended to augment crewed fighter aircraft such as the F-22 Raptor, F-35 Lightning, and the planned Boeing F-47 fighter for air-to-air missions through manned-unmanned teaming (MUM-T).

== Development and design ==
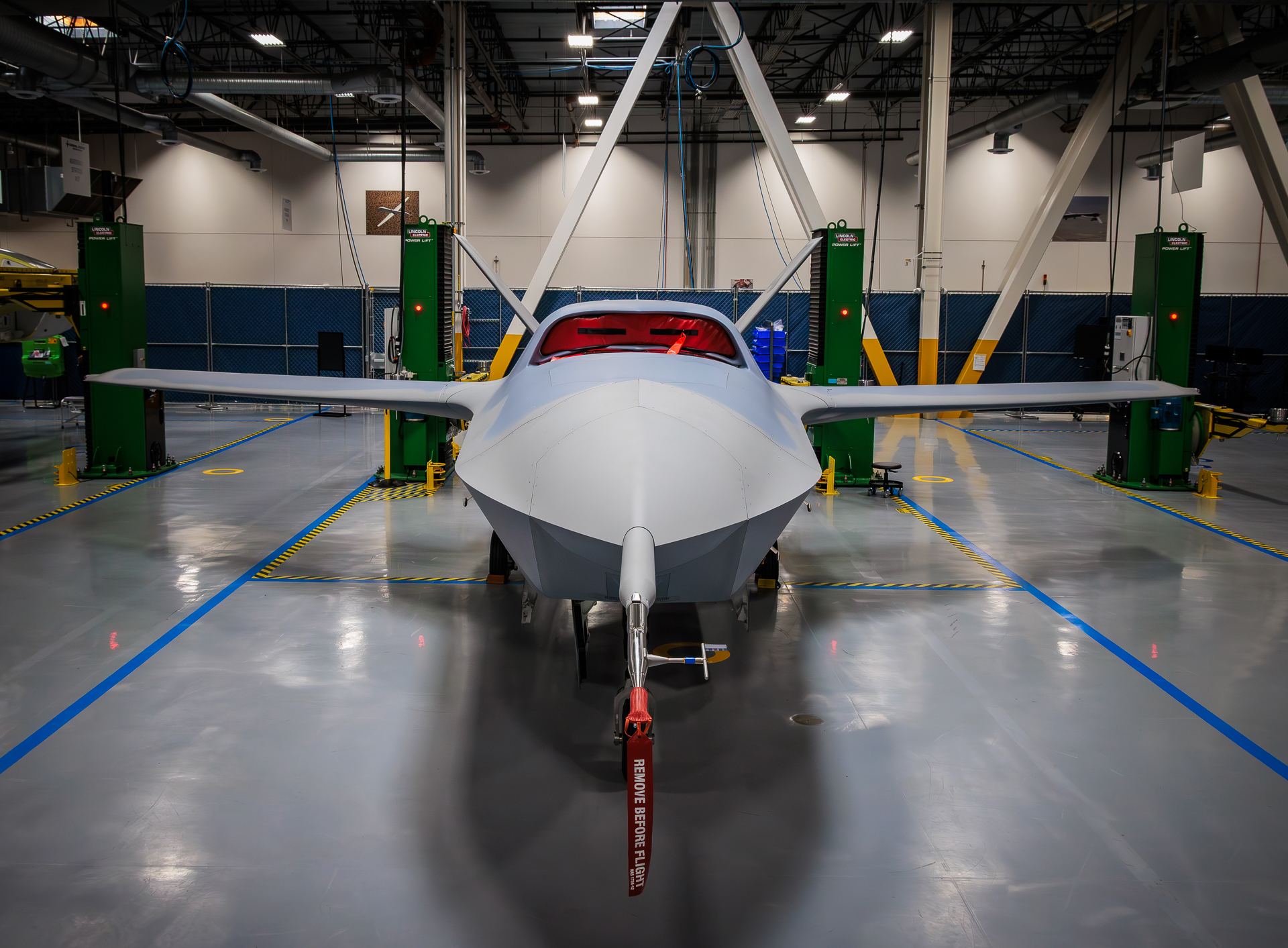
General Atomics YFQ-42A in a ground test facility.

The FQ-42 is a member of General Atomics "Gambit" family of UCAVs and derived from the company's XQ-67A Off-Board Sensing Station demonstrator built for the Air Force Research Laboratory. The design was selected as one of the two winners of the Increment I CCA with designation YFQ-42 alongside the Anduril's "Fury" design designated as the YFQ-44.

A mockup of the design was showcased during a September 2024 Air Force conference; the aircraft's configuration is similar to the XQ-67A but modified for greater speeds and fighter-like maneuverability, with the airframe having an elongated fuselage with slender wings, a dorsal-mounted inlet, a single engine, V-tails, and internal weapons bay. Planned armament is two AIM-120 AMRAAMs. The design is expected to provide the USAF with "affordable mass" to augment its crewed fighters in air-to-air missions. Its low cost nature, while not attritable, enables users and commanders to take greater risks with them.

The aircraft received its formal designation during the 2025 Air & Space Forces Association symposium. On 27 August 2025, the United States Air Force and General Atomics announced the YFQ-42A had begun its flight testing.

On 23 February 2026, in a statement from General Atomics, the YFQ-42 was named "Dark Merlin", named after a type of falcon.

On 17 June 2026, the Air Force announced it had selected both the YFQ-42 and Anduril's YFQ-44 for an initial production contract, with a combined 150 FQ-42s and FQ-44s to be built by 2030.

On 14 September 2026, the United States Air Force announced that the FQ-42 production aircraft would be named "Vengeance".

=== Flight test mishap ===
On 6 April 2026 a YFQ-42A crashed during a mishap shortly after takeoff, resulting in the total loss of an aircraft and causing delays in flight testing activities. Flight testing resumed on 21 May 2026.

The cause was determined to be an autopilot miscalculation of the aircraft weight & center of gravity.

== Production ==
Fuselage aerostructures for the FQ-42 are built in Wichita, Kansas, by Spirit Defense, a Boeing subsidiary, and shipped to San Diego for final assembly. General Atomics announced Spirit Defense as its fuselage design-build partner on 23 October 2026, the day Spirit Defense unveiled a 50,000-square-foot (4,600 m^{2}) production building for the program.

== Variants ==
- YFQ-42A: Prototype aircraft tested by the U.S. Air Force.
- FQ-42A: Production aircraft selected for the U.S. Air Force.

== Operators ==
United States

- United States Air Force

== See also ==
Related development

- General Atomics XQ-67A

Aircraft of comparable role, configuration, and era

- Anduril FQ-44
- Bayraktar Kızılelma
- Boeing MQ-28 Ghost Bat
- Northrop Grumman YFQ-48

Related lists

- List of unmanned aerial vehicles
