= CASC CH-901 =

Chinese missile and loitering munition

CH-901 / FH-901
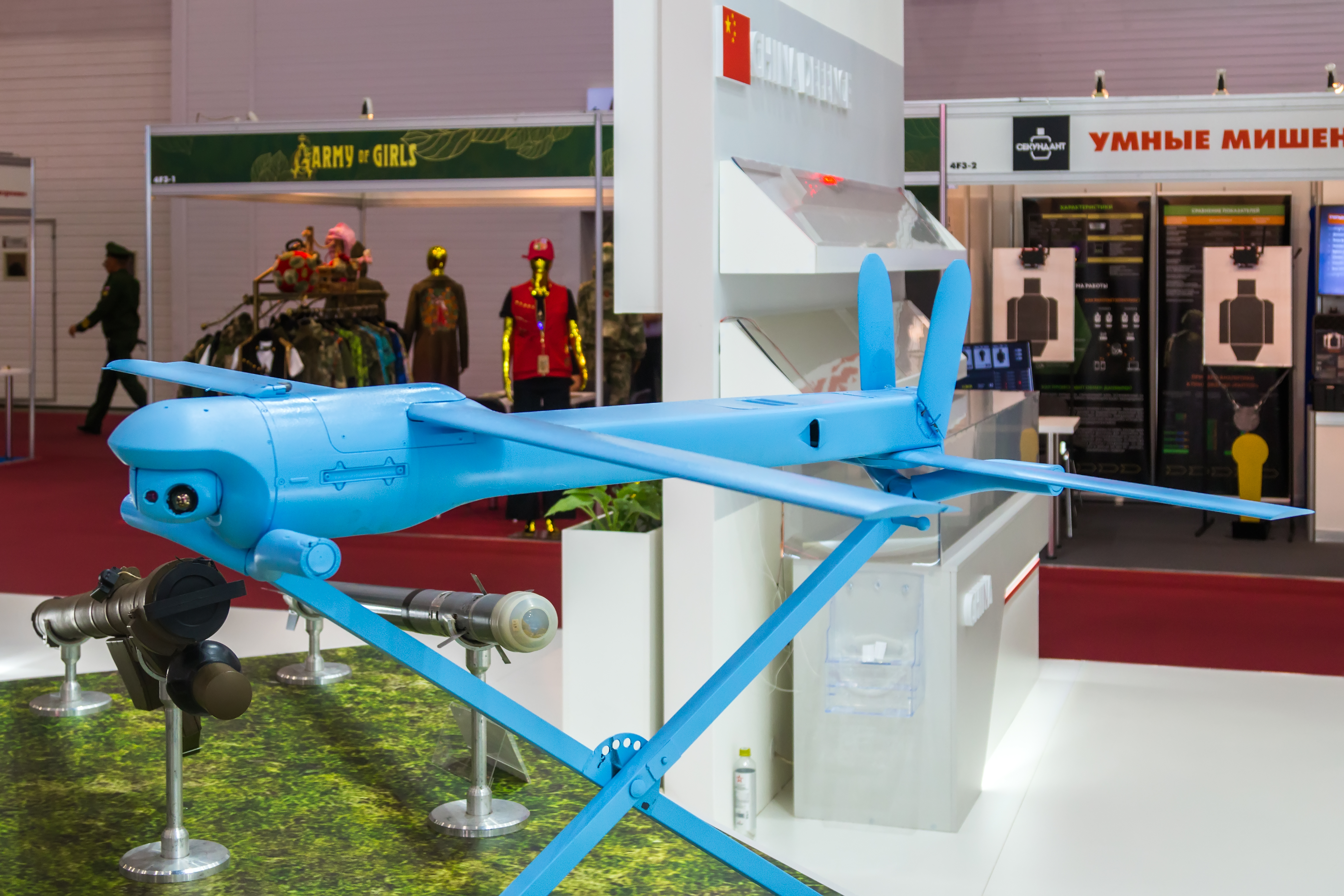
- FH-901 loitering munition mockup
- Type: anti-ship, anti-tank, land-attack missile / loitering munition
- Place of origin: China

Production history
- Manufacturer: China Aerospace Science and Technology Corporation (CASC)
- Produced: 2016-present

Specifications
- Warhead: 3.5 kg (7.7 lb) of HE / HE-Frag / HEAT shaped charge / camera head
- Flight altitude: 100–150 m (330–490 ft)
- Maximum speed: Stanard: 180 km/h (110 mph); Cruise: 100 km/h (62 mph); Terminal: 288 km/h (179 mph)
- Guidance system: electro-optical seeker
- Launch platform: Air, ground-launched

The CH-901, also known as the FH-901, is a type of loitering munition developed by the China Aerospace Science and Technology Corporation (CASC), unveiled in 2016, part of the Rainbow series.

External videos
- Footage of CH-901 on YouTube

== Design ==
The CH-901 can be prepared and launched from its tube in 3 minutes. The drone then dashes to its target area at 180 km/h (110 mph), where it flies around for up to 60 minutes, at 100 km/h (62 mph), and at an altitude of 100–150 m (330–490 ft). Once a target is located using the drones electro-optical guidance, it dives onto its target at 288 km/h (179 mph) and detonates its warhead. The CH-901 can carry a 3.5 kg (7.7 lb) high explosive warhead, a fragmentation charge, a shaped charge for penetrating armor, or a camera for reconnaissance. The drones can also be launched in waves to swarm and overwhelm enemies.

=== Launch platform ===
The drone can be deployed in several ways; it can be carried by soldiers in the field and launched out of a tube, as well as from vehicles, aircraft, and UCAVs.

In 2020, China unveiled a Dongfeng Mengshi truck fitted with 48 launch tubes for CH-901 loitering munitions.

The CH-901 can also be launched from the new FH-97 loyal wingman drone, which was unveiled at Airshow China in 2021.

== Specifications ==
Data from

General characteristics

- Length: 1.2 m (3 ft 11 in)
- Gross weight: 9 kg (19.8 lb)

Performance

- Maximum speed: 288 km/h (179 mph, 156 kn) when diving
- Cruise speed: 180 km/h (110 mph, 97 kn) cruising to target
- Range: 15 km (9.3 mi, 8.1 nmi)
- Endurance: 60 minutes
- Service ceiling: 150 m (490 ft)
