= Joint Simulation Environment =

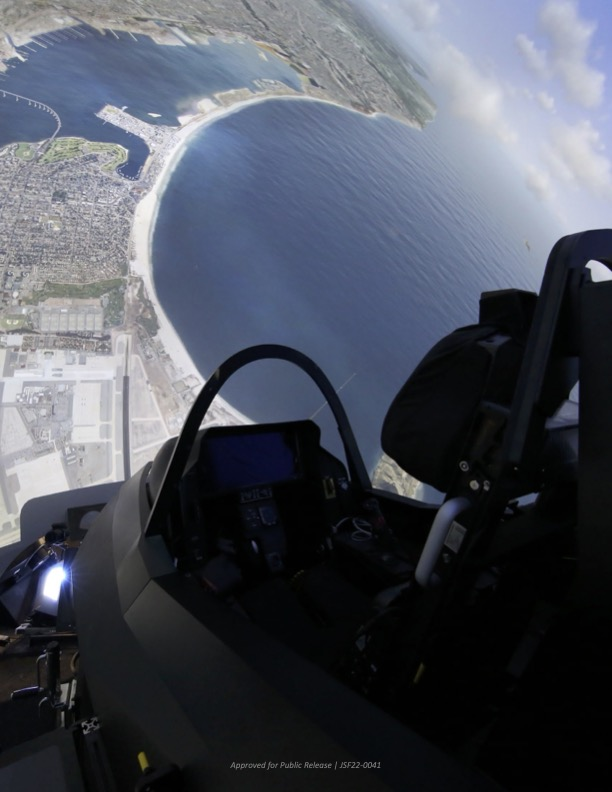
Partial view of the cockpit and simulated landscape in a Joint Simulation Environment flight simulator

The Joint Simulation Environment is a joint effort of the United States Air Force and Navy to produce flight simulators that can provide the most realistic combat training possible for air crew, as well as to perform operational testing and to develop tactics.

The first JSE installation opened at Naval Air Station Patuxent River in Maryland in 2023; its second and third locations opened the following year at Edwards Air Force Base in California and Nellis AFB in Nevada. A fourth JSE installation is to open at Naval Air Station Fallon in Nevada in 2025, while a fifth is planned for Joint Base Elmendorf-Richardson in Alaska. A smaller shipboard version is aboard the aircraft carrier Abraham Lincoln.

== Description ==
In 2024, a Navy fact sheet described the Pax River installation as "a government owned and operated facility where warfighters can train in the highest fidelity simulation of the operational battlespace. JSE provides a physics-based computer environment capable of simultaneous interactions between manned aircraft simulators and thousands of virtual friendly and enemy air and surface entities. This allows the warfighter to execute testing, training, or tactics development and validation to an unprecedented level of fidelity. The density and realism of training experienced at JSE enables the warfighter to learn and improve at a pace unachievable anywhere else."

The sheet said the installation featured 14 domed flight simulators, each with a 300- by 160-degree field of view under 4K projectors; eight simulators that can used helmet-mounted displays to simulate all three U.S. variants of the F-35; six simulators that can simulate the F-35 and various enemy aircraft; three mission-briefing rooms for simultaneous briefing, debriefing, and sortie execution."

Aviators say JSE is the first simulator that gives them “a true sense of fear,” JSE Director Blaine Summers told FlightGlobal in 2024. “That’s because the threat representation is high quality. That F-35 operator is getting visible and audible warnings. They’re getting engaged with weapons. They’re getting punished if they make mistakes tactically.”

== History ==
The Joint Simulation Environment began as a way to complete operational testing for the Lockheed Martin F-35 Lightning II combat jet because some of the fighter’s capabilities were "too sensitive to turn on during live flight,” as Air & Space Forces Magazine put it. Later, the Air Force Weapons School realized it could be used to train pilots.

In 2016, the Navy and Air Force took over the program from Lockheed Martin, the contractor that had done the initial work.

The JSE is considered a vital part of the F-35’s development; the plane was not judged ready for full production until the simulator was running well enough.

Construction on the $34.4 million, 72,000-square-foot JSE installation at Edwards AFB started in February 2021; the Air Force described it as a facility for "fifth-generation and next-generation developmental test, operational test, and high-end advanced training and tactics development". Nellis AFB was slated to have a $27.5 million, 50,000-square-foot JSE installation.

A fourth is being built at Fallon NAS. All four will run the same software, ensuring that air crew all get the same training experience against similar threats.

In September 2024, Air Force officials said the JSEs were being updated to include Collaborative Combat Aircraft: prototypes of uncrewed aircraft intended one day to fly alongside crewed tactical aircraft.

During fiscal 2024, 820 F-35 pilots from the U.S. and foreign militaries trained at the Pax River JSE site for the most intensive combat exercises "because they can't get that anywhere else", said Derek Greer, the director of integrated battle space simulation and the test department at the Naval Air Warfare Center Aircraft Division.

By December 2024, all three of the Air Force and Navy air-weapons schools, including TOPGUN, had “changed their curriculum to bring their students to JSE. So they are bringing the students with the instructor pilots for a week of air-to-air [combat] and a week of air-to-surface [combat] as part of the curriculum,” he said.

Greer said that the program's immediate priority is more weapons, aircraft, and threat elements to the simulations. A future goal is to network multiple JSEs together. The sim generates “gobs and gobs and gobs of data that we cannot distribute over our networks in real time today,” he said.

== See also ==
- Digital Combat Simulator
