= Scaled Composites 401 =

American experimental aircraft

Model 401
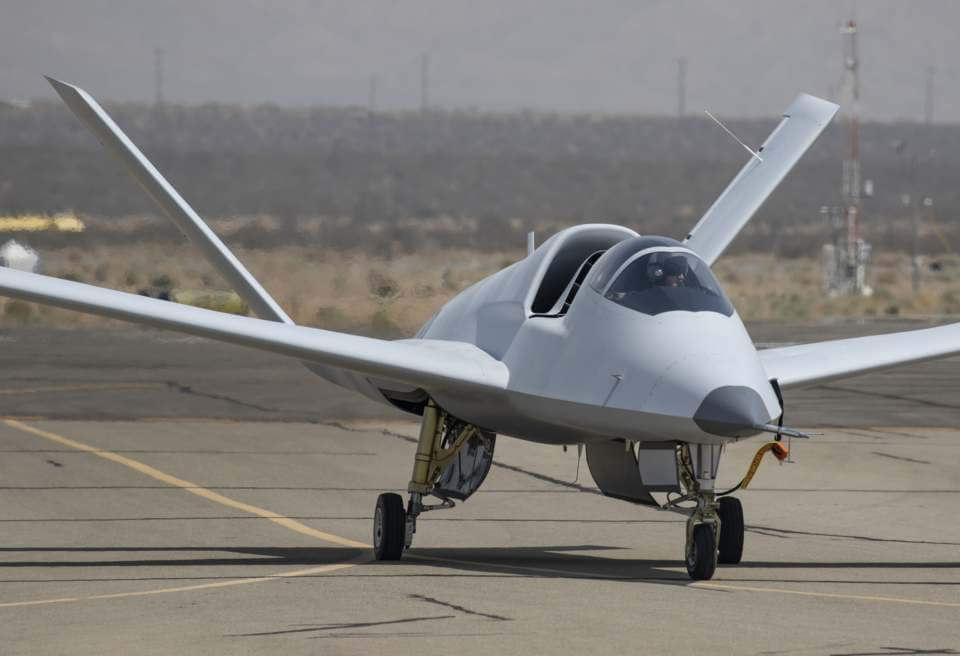

General information
- Type: Experimental aircraft
- National origin: United States
- Manufacturer: Scaled Composites
- Status: Under development (2017)
- Number built: Two

History
- Introduction date: 2017
- First flight: 11 October 2017
- Developed into: Scaled Composites 437

The Scaled Composites Sierra (Model 401) is an American experimental aircraft, designed and produced by Scaled Composites of Mojave Spaceport, Mojave, California, introduced in 2017. The two examples built were constructed for an unnamed customer to demonstrate "advanced, low-cost manufacturing techniques" for the production of research aircraft for both industry and government.

First flight was on 11 October 2017.

== Design and development ==
The Model 401 is a single-seat experimental prototype of broadly conventional configuration. The pressurized cockpit is enclosed by a bubble canopy and the plane incorporates a single jet engine and retractable tricycle landing gear.

A low-wing cantilever monoplane, it has lightly swept constant-chord wings with trapezoidal inner sections. It has a butterfly or V tail.

The aircraft is made from composite material. It has a 38 ft (11.6 m) span wing and a fuselage also of 38 ft (11.6 m) in length. Empty weight is 4,000 lb (1,814 kg) and gross take off weight is 8,000 lb (3,629 kg). The engine used is a single Pratt & Whitney Canada JT15D-5D powerplant, producing 3,045 lbf (14 kN; 1,381 kgf) of thrust.

== Specifications (401) ==
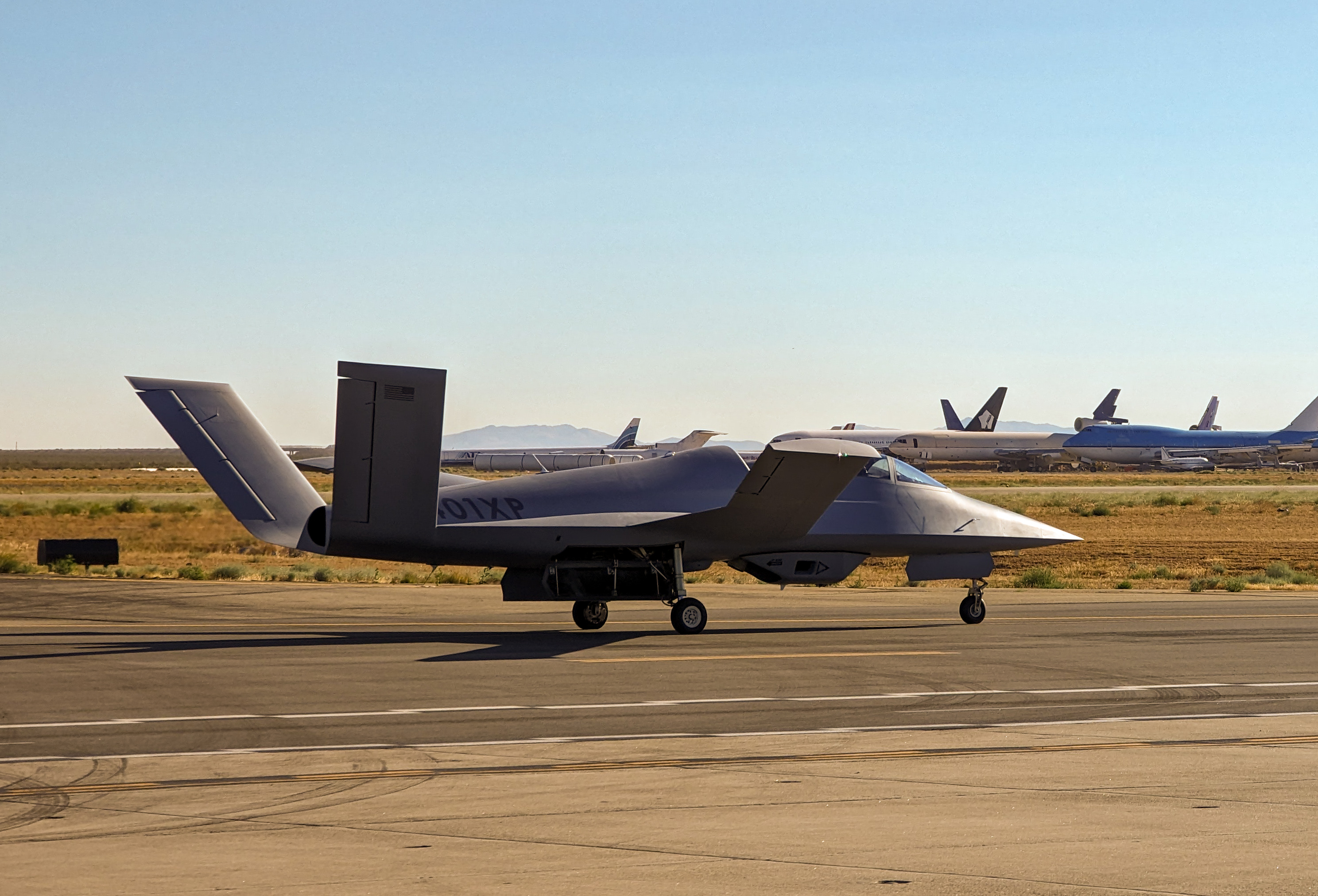
Scaled Composites 401 experimental/demonstrator aircraft

Data from AVweb

General characteristics

- Crew: one
- Length: 38 ft (12 m)
- Wingspan: 38 ft (12 m)
- Empty weight: 4,000 lb (1,814 kg)
- Gross weight: 8,000 lb (3,629 kg)
- Powerplant: 1 × Pratt & Whitney Canada JT15D-5D turbofan, 3,045 lbf (13.54 kN) thrust

Performance

- Maximum speed: Mach 0.6
- Endurance: 3 hours
- Service ceiling: 30,000 ft (9,100 m)
