= Feihong FH-97A =

Type of aircraft

- FH-97A mockup in Zhuhai Airshow 2024

General information
- Type: Unmanned combat aerial vehicle; Loyal wingman drone
- National origin: China
- Manufacturer: Aerospace Times Feihong Technology Corporation

History
- Manufactured: 2022
- Developed from: Feihong FH-97

The Feihong FH-97A is a conceptual or prototype AI piloted unmanned combat aerial vehicle. It was developed as a loyal wingman drone, designed to fly along the J-20 fighter and suppress air defenses with electronic countermeasures, fly ahead to provide early warning, and absorb damage from attacks, as well as evaluating damage and conducting reconnaissance. It is designed to carry up to 8 small air-to-air missiles or loitering munitions and use rocket boosters to takeoff without a runway. The FH-97A was developed by the Aerospace Times Feihong Technology Corporation and unveiled to the public in 2022 at the biennial China International Aviation & Aerospace Exhibition (Airshow China) in Zhuhai, China. As of 2026, there is no visual proof that the aircraft completed its maiden flight.
