= DARPA AlphaDogfight =

Dogfight between 2 F-16s in simulation software; the pilots in this case are AI programs who are fighting for the chance to engage with a human pilot. The trajectories of the aircraft are denoted in pink and blue, as are the scores of the engagements.

The DARPA AlphaDogfight was a 2019–2020 DARPA program that pitted computers using F-16 flight simulators against one another. The computers were managed by eight teams of humans, who competed in a single-round elimination for the right to battle a skilled human dogfighter. Heron Systems corporation wrote a deep reinforcement learning software tool that bested the human pilot by a score of 5–0. The tournament program was managed by the Applied Physics Laboratory. The trials took place in October 2019 and January 2020 while the finals were held in August 2020. In 2024 a successor version of the program was tested with in the physical world with the X-62A.
