= Skyborg =

U.S. Air Force R&D program

Kratos XQ-58 Valkyrie

The Skyborg project is a United States Air Force Vanguard program developing unmanned combat aerial vehicles intended to accompany a manned fighter aircraft. As of 2020, contracts have been awarded to Boeing, General Atomics, Kratos Unmanned Aerial Systems and Northrop Grumman.

== Development ==
On September 29, 2020, the US Air Force contracted nine corporations (AeroVironment, Autonodyne LLC, BAE Systems, Blue Force Technologies (since purchased by Anduril), Fregata Systems LLC, Lockheed Martin, NextGen Aeronautic, Sierra Technical Services, and Wichita State University) to work on Skyborg prototyping and experimentation. On December 21, 2020, Voly Defense Solutions LLC of Concord, California, was added to the contract.

== See also ==
- AVIC Dark Sword
- Baykar Bayraktar Kızılelma
- Boeing MQ-28 Ghost Bat, formerly the Boeing Airpower Teaming System
- Kratos XQ-58 Valkyrie
- X-62A VISTA, formerly the NF-16D VISTA
