= General Atomics XQ-67A =

Unmanned combat aircraft demonstrator built by General Atomics

XQ-67A
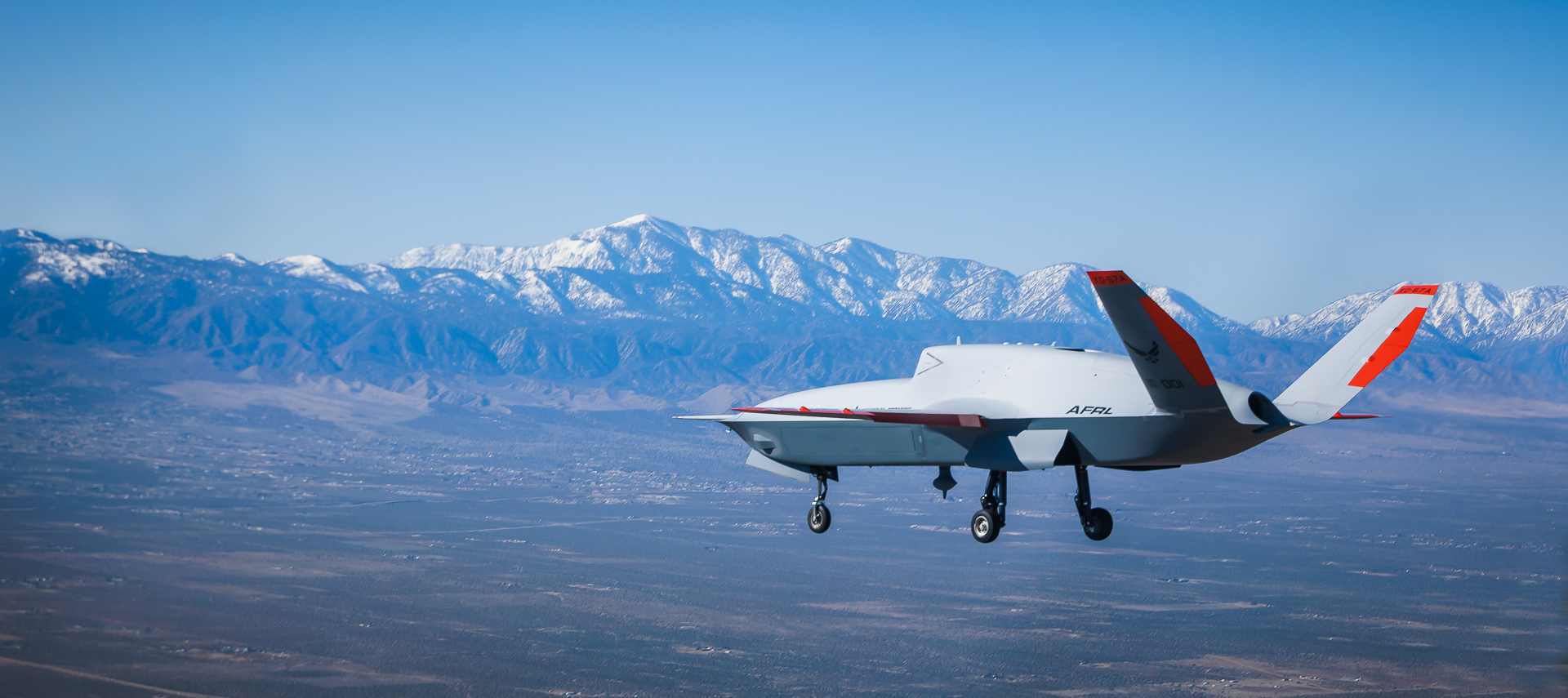
- XQ-67A first flight

General information
- Type: Unmanned combat aerial vehicle; Loyal wingman drone
- National origin: United States
- Manufacturer: General Atomics Aeronautical Systems
- Status: Under development
- Primary user: United States Air Force

History
- First flight: 28 February 2024
- Developed into: General Atomics YFQ-42

The General Atomics XQ-67A is a developmental loyal wingman type unmanned combat aerial vehicle (UCAV) built by General Atomics Aeronautical Systems (GA-ASI) for the United States Air Force Off-Board Sensing Station program and as a prototype for the collaborative combat aircraft (CCA) program.

== Design and development ==
In February 2023 the Air Force Research Laboratory (AFRL) announced that GA-ASI had been selected to build and test a UAV for the Off-Board Sensing Station (OBSS) program, intended to fly ahead of and pass data back to manned aircraft. The prototype was publicly unveiled by GA-ASI on 8 February 2024. It is unclear whether or not the XQ-67A is capable of carrying weapons.

The XQ-67A had its first flight on 28 February 2024 from GA-ASI's Grey Butte Flight Operations Facility near Palmdale, California. The AFRL stated that "the XQ-67A is the first of a second generation of autonomous collaborative platforms. Following the success of the XQ-58A Valkyrie, the first low-cost uncrewed air vehicle intended to provide the warfighter with credible and affordable mass, the XQ-67A proves the common chassis, or "genus", approach to aircraft design, build and test. This approach paves the way for other aircraft "species" to be rapidly replicated on a standard genus chassis. The genus can be built upon for other aircraft — similar to that of a vehicle frame — with the possibility of adding different aircraft kits to the frame, such as an Off-Board Sensing Station or Off-Board Weapon Station."

On 24 April 2024, upon being awarded for the collaborative combat aircraft (CCA) Increment I, GA-ASI announced that the XQ-67A was a prototype for the CCA program and that the official entry for the CCA, later designated the YFQ-42, would be based on the XQ-67A and feature a common core system. It is speculated that the XQ-67A is representative of "Gambit 1", the first iteration of the previously revealed General Atomics Gambit family. However, GA-ASI has made no specific connection between the XQ-67A, the CCA program, and Gambit.

== See also ==
Related development

- General Atomics YFQ-42

Aircraft of comparable role, configuration, and era

- Boeing MQ-28 Ghost Bat
- Kratos XQ-58 Valkyrie
- EADS Barracuda

Related lists

- List of unmanned aerial vehicles
