= Kratos XQ-58 Valkyrie =

Planned stealth unmanned combat air vehicle for the US Air Force

XQ-58 Valkyrie
- The XQ-58A Valkyrie demonstrator on its inaugural flight, 5 March 2019 at Yuma Proving Ground, Arizona

General information
- Type: Experimental unmanned combat aerial vehicle; Loyal wingman drone
- National origin: United States
- Manufacturer: Kratos Defense & Security Solutions
- Status: In development (to jointly developed by Kratos and Northrop Grumman into a loyal wingman aircraft for the United States Marine Corps)
- Primary user: United States Marine Corps (future version)

History
- First flight: 5 March 2019

The Kratos XQ-58 Valkyrie is an experimental stealth loyal wingman type unmanned combat aerial vehicle (UCAV) designed and built by Kratos Defense & Security Solutions for the United States Air Force's Low Cost Attritable Strike Demonstrator (LCASD) program, under the USAF Research Laboratory's Low Cost Attritable Aircraft Technology (LCAAT) project portfolio. It was initially designated the XQ-222. The Valkyrie completed its first flight on 5 March 2019 at Yuma Proving Ground, Arizona.

== Development and design ==
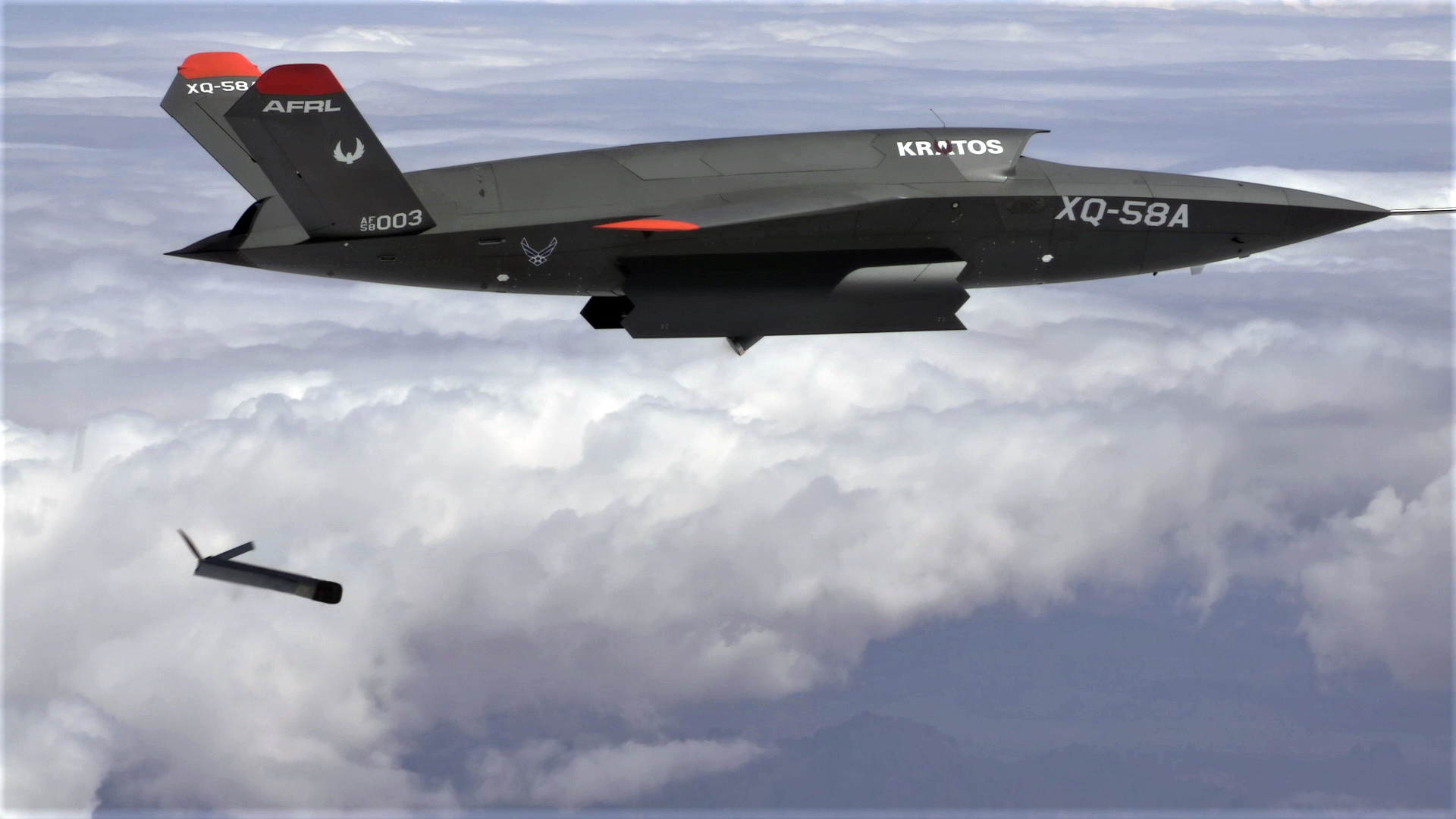
A XQ-58 Valkyrie deploys an Altius-600 unmanned aircraft system

The XQ-58 Valkyrie fell within the USAF Research Laboratory's Low Cost Attritable Aircraft Technology (LCAAT) portfolio, whose objectives included designing and building unmanned combat aerial vehicles (UCAVs) faster, by developing better design tools and maturing and using commercial manufacturing processes to reduce production time and cost. The LCAAT was to escort the F-22 or F-35 during combat missions and to deploy weapons or surveillance systems. The LCAAT was eventually turned into the Off-Board Sensing Station (OBSS) program, which Kratos was awarded a contract for in 2021 but lost out to General Atomics in 2023, which developed the XQ-67A. The USAF determined the XQ-58 airframe was too small to meet the requirements of the collaborative combat aircraft program.

The XQ-58 is designed to act as a loyal wingman that is controlled by a parent aircraft to accomplish tasks such as scouting, defensive fire, or absorbing enemy fire. It features stealth technology with a trapezoidal fuselage with a chined edge, V-tail, and an S-shaped air intake. The XQ-58 can operate as part of a swarm of drones, with or without direct pilot control. There are three variants of XQ-58A: one designed for rocket boosted launch from a rail system, one designed for trolley launch and parachute landing, and one with landing gear that is capable of conventional take-offs and landings but sacrifices payload capacity from four to two GBU-39 Small Diameter Bombs. All three versions can be launched from "nondescript launch modules", such as support ships, shipping containers, and semi-trailer trucks.

Kratos officials have said the company could produce 250 to 500 Valkyries per year. It can be produced at a unit cost of $4 million at an annual production rate of 50 aircraft, and possibly for less than $2 million if over 100 airframes are built per year.

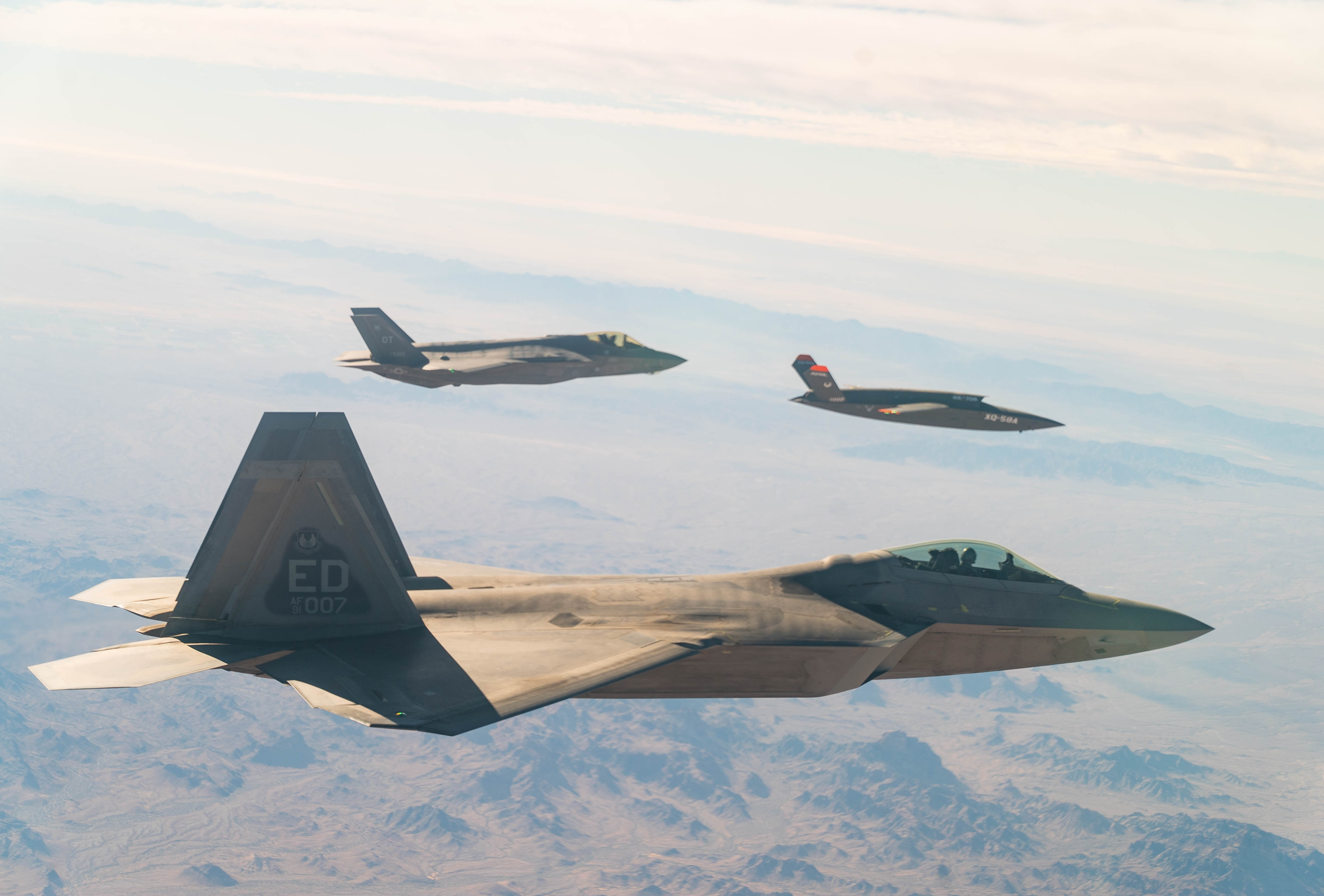
An F-22 and F-35 flying in formation with an XQ-58A

In April 2025, Kratos officials stated that “...we’re pretty close to having a couple final versions of the aircraft” for the Marine Corps, which had been testing it extensively as part of the PAACK-P (Penetrating Affordable Autonomous Collaborative Killer Program). At least two mission configurations of the system were announced to exist in a production status at Kratos' Oklahoma facilities, with Kratos indicating readiness to accept a more substantial production order. At least five XQ-58 variants are in development, and it is unclear which variants were in production, though defense analysts speculated that one would be optimized for electronic attack and the other for kinetic strikes.

On 13th July 2025, Airbus announced a partnership with Kratos to develop an uncrewed collaborative combat aircraft (UCCA) based on the XQ-58A for the German Air Force. The UCCA will feature an Airbus-made mission system and is expected to be combat-ready by 2029. The programme forms part of a broader Bundeswehr procurement initiative to introduce a stealthy, subsonic, deep-strike drone capable of ranges exceeding 540 nmi (621 mi, 1,000km) by 2029. On January 8, 2026, The U.S. Marine Corps has officially selected Northrop Grumman and Kratos to develop its first operational "Collaborative Combat Aircraft (CCA)." This announcement marks the transition of the Kratos XQ-58 Valkyrie from an experimental testbed into a loyal wingman aircraft.

In April 2026, Airbus disclosed it had acquired two XQ-58A airframes, located at Manching, to develop a Bundeswehr "Jagdbomberdrohne" with its MARS mission system, targeting a first European flight in 2026 and operational use by 2029.

== Operational history ==
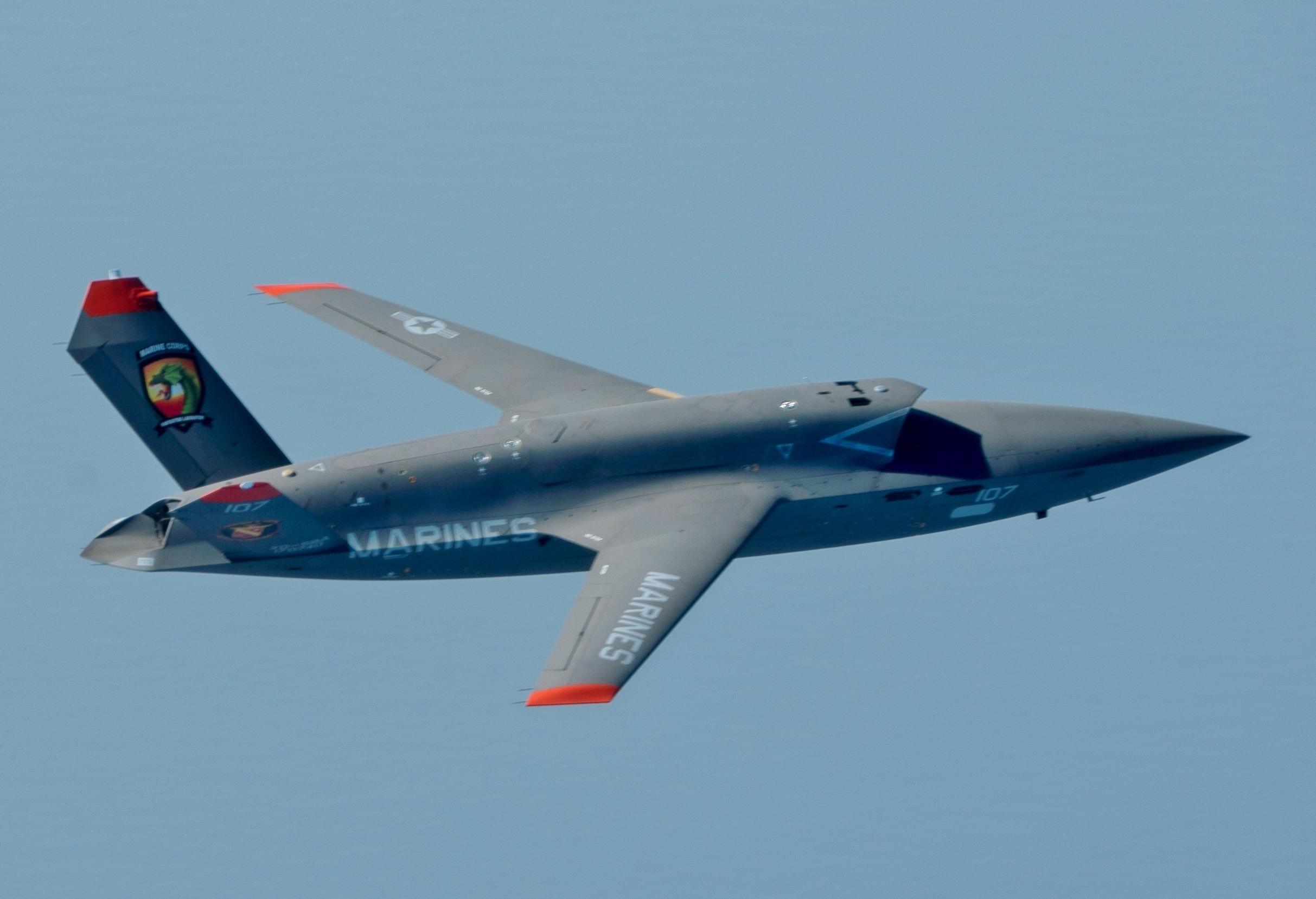
A U.S. Marine Corps XQ-58A Valkyrie

The XQ-58's first flight took place on 5 March 2019, about two and a half years after Kratos received the contract. Five test flights were planned in two phases to evaluate system functionality, aerodynamic performance, and launch and recovery systems.

On 23 July 2020, the Air Force gave contracts to Kratos, Boeing, Northrop Grumman, and General Atomics to compete for the Skyborg program, an effort to field an unmanned wingman for manned fighters, at a price that makes it somewhat expendable. Northrop was eliminated in December 2020. Kratos, Boeing, and General Atomics delivered their entries by May 2021 for flight tests in July 2021.

In March 2021, the XQ-58A completed its sixth test flight, opening the doors of its internal weapons bay for the first time and releasing a 27 lb (12 kg) Area-I Altius-600 small unmanned aircraft system (UAS).

In August 2023, a report with pictures showed the XQ-58A in formation with an F-15E Strike Eagle from the 96th Test Wing’s 40th Flight Test Squadron at Eglin Air Force Base, Florida.

In December 2022, the United States Marine Corps ordered two XQ-58s for testing under the Marine Corps Penetrating Affordable Autonomous Collaborative Killer – Portfolio (PAACK-P) program, and conducted first test flights at Eglin Air Force Base in October 2023. In January 2023, the United States Navy ordered two XQ-58s for tests similar to those being undertaken by the Marines.

On 2 April 2024, Kratos made a press release concerning an XQ-58 test with electronic warfare equipment, where it also mentioned the MQ-58B model. The MQ-58B, which is intended to fulfill the role of suppression of enemy air defenses, or SEAD, is one of at least five variants of the XQ-58 under development by Kratos. This news comes alongside an announcement that the future variants of the Valkyrie will include underwing hardpoints for munitions, where a rendering of an XQ-58 was shown with two underwing hardpoints, each carrying an AIM-120 AMRAAM.

== Variants ==
- XQ-58A: Original prototype variant being tested with the branches of the U.S. Military.
- MQ-58B: An electronic attack version intended for production and service currently under development for the United States Marine Corps. It is intended for use in the SEAD role as a collaborative combat aircraft, to be operated alongside USMC F-35s.

== Operators ==
=== Future operators ===
United States

- United States Marine Corps

=== Potential operators ===
United States

- United States Air Force

Germany

- German Air Force

Republic of China (Taiwan)

- Republic of China Air Force

== Specifications ==
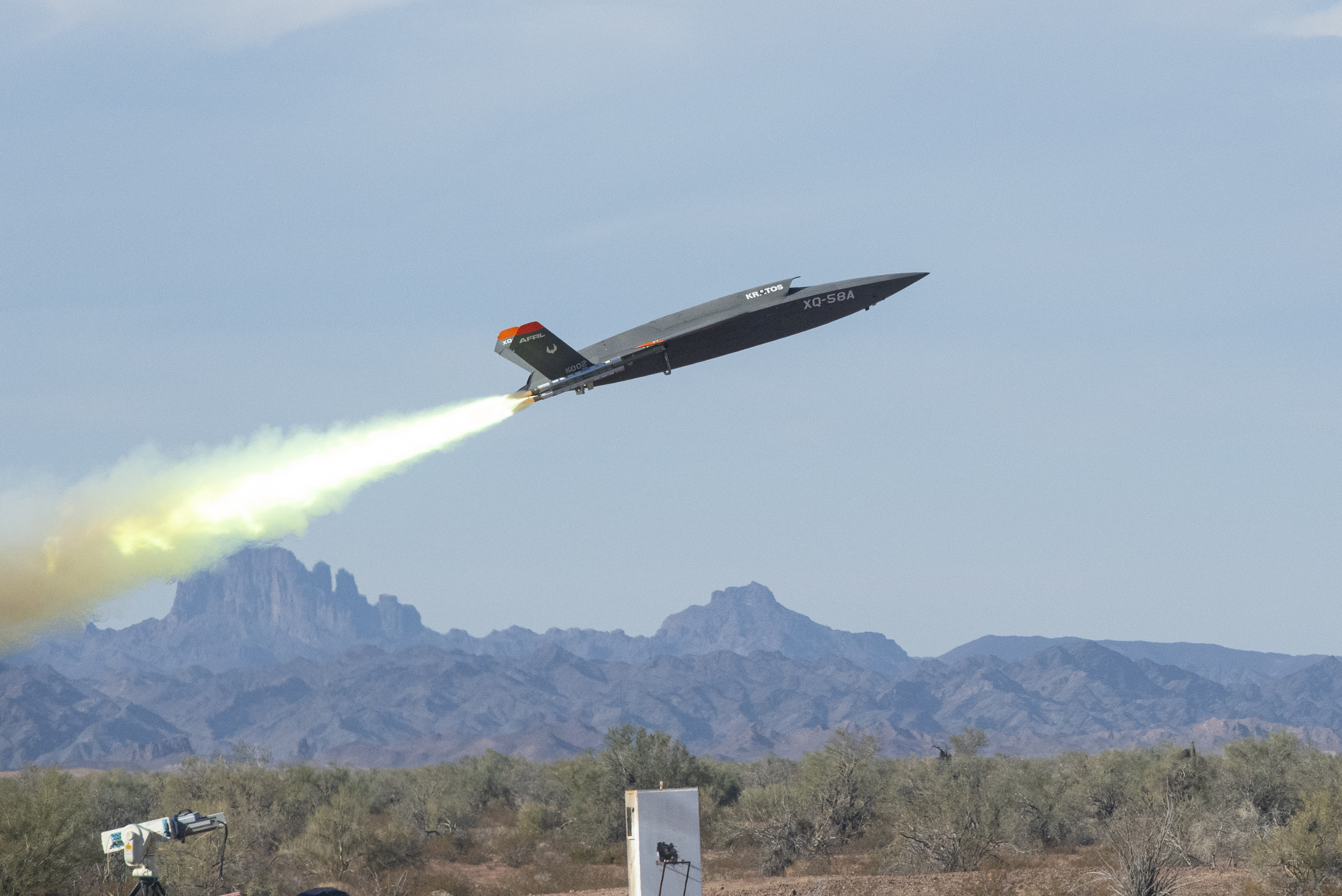
The second XQ-58 Valkyrie, using JATO during takeoff from Laguna Army Airfield.

Data from Kratos Defense Data sheet

General characteristics

- Capacity: 600 lb (272 kg) internal, 600 lb (272 kg) external
- Length: 30 ft (9.1 m)
- Wingspan: 27 ft (8.2 m)
- Empty weight: 2,500 lb (1,134 kg)
- Max takeoff weight: 6,000 lb (2,722 kg)
- Powerplant: 1 × Williams FJ33 turbofan, 2,000 lbf (8.9 kN) thrust

Performance

- Maximum speed: 566 kn (651 mph, 1,048 km/h)
- Cruise speed: 476 kn (548 mph, 882 km/h)
- Range: 3,000 nmi (3,500 mi, 5,600 km) approximate
- Service ceiling: 45,000 ft (14,000 m)

Armament

- Up to 600 lb (270 kg) in internal weapons bay
- Up to 600 lb (270 kg) on mid-wing hardpoints

== See also ==
Aircraft of comparable role, configuration, and era

- Boeing MQ-25 Stingray
- Boeing MQ-28 Ghost Bat
- AVIC Dark Sword
- Baykar Bayraktar Kızılelma
- HAL Combat Air Teaming System
- HAL CATS Warrior
- Feihong FH-97
- TAI Anka-3

Related lists

- List of stealth aircraft
