= Dale R. White =

U.S. Air Force general

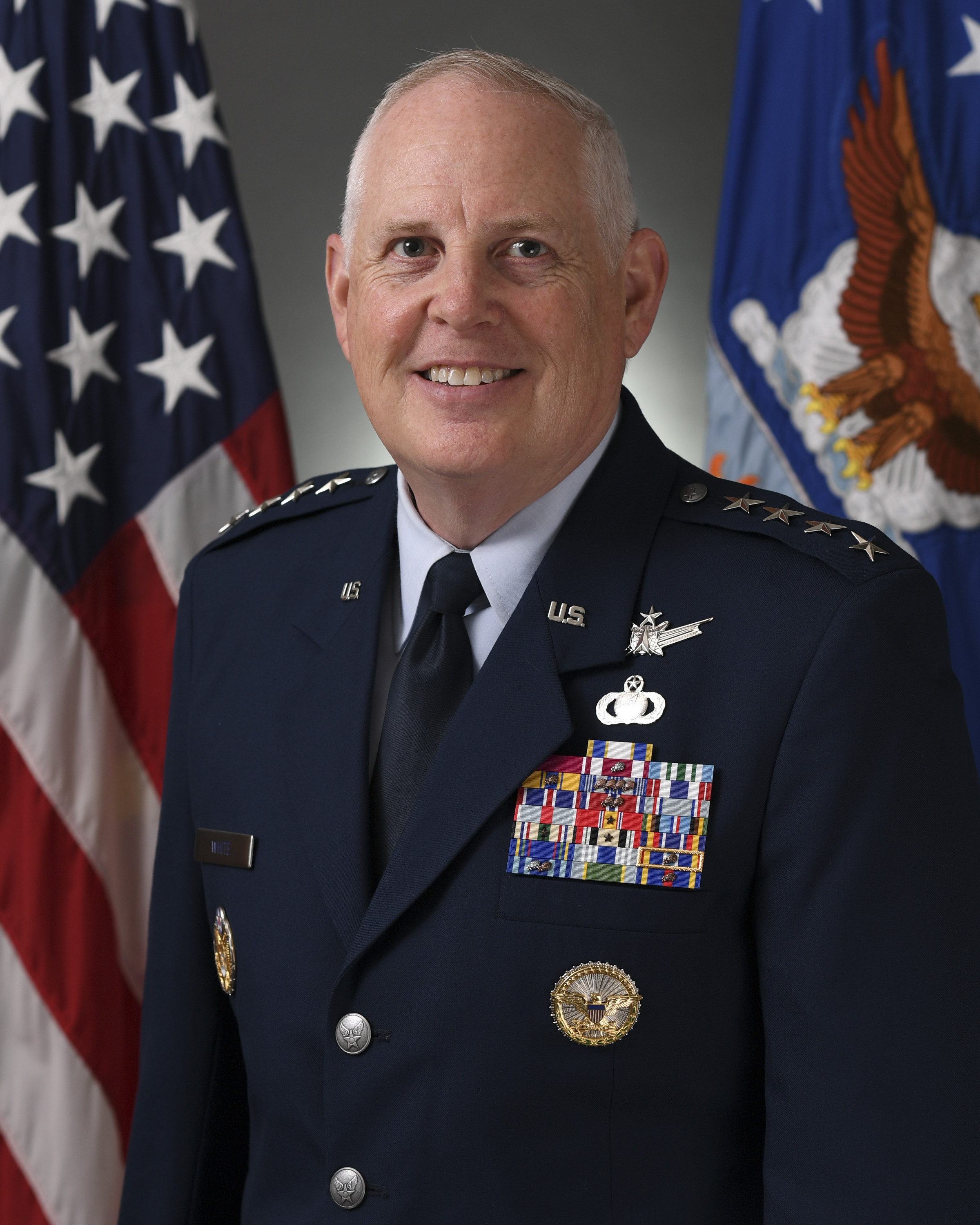
- Official portrait, 2026
- Born: c. 1971 (age 54–55)
- Education: Dallas Baptist University(BBA); University of New Mexico(MBA)
- Military career
- Allegiance: United States
- Branch: United States Air Force
- Service years: 1997–present
- Rank: General
- Conflicts: Iraq War
- Awards: Legion of Merit

Dale R. White (born c. 1971) is a United States Air Force general who has served as the direct reporting portfolio manager for Critical Major Weapon Systems Programs since 19 December 2025. He previously served as the military deputy to the assistant secretary of the Air Force for acquisition, technology and logistics from December 2023 to December 2025. Prior to that, he served as the program executive officer for fighters and advanced aircraft.

In March 2023, White was nominated for promotion to major general. In April 2023, he was nominated for promotion to lieutenant general and appointment as the military deputy to the Assistant Secretary of the Air Force for Acquisition, Technology, and Logistics.

== Awards and decorations ==
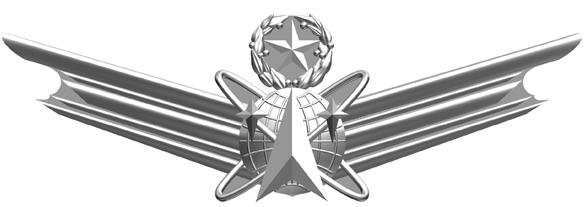

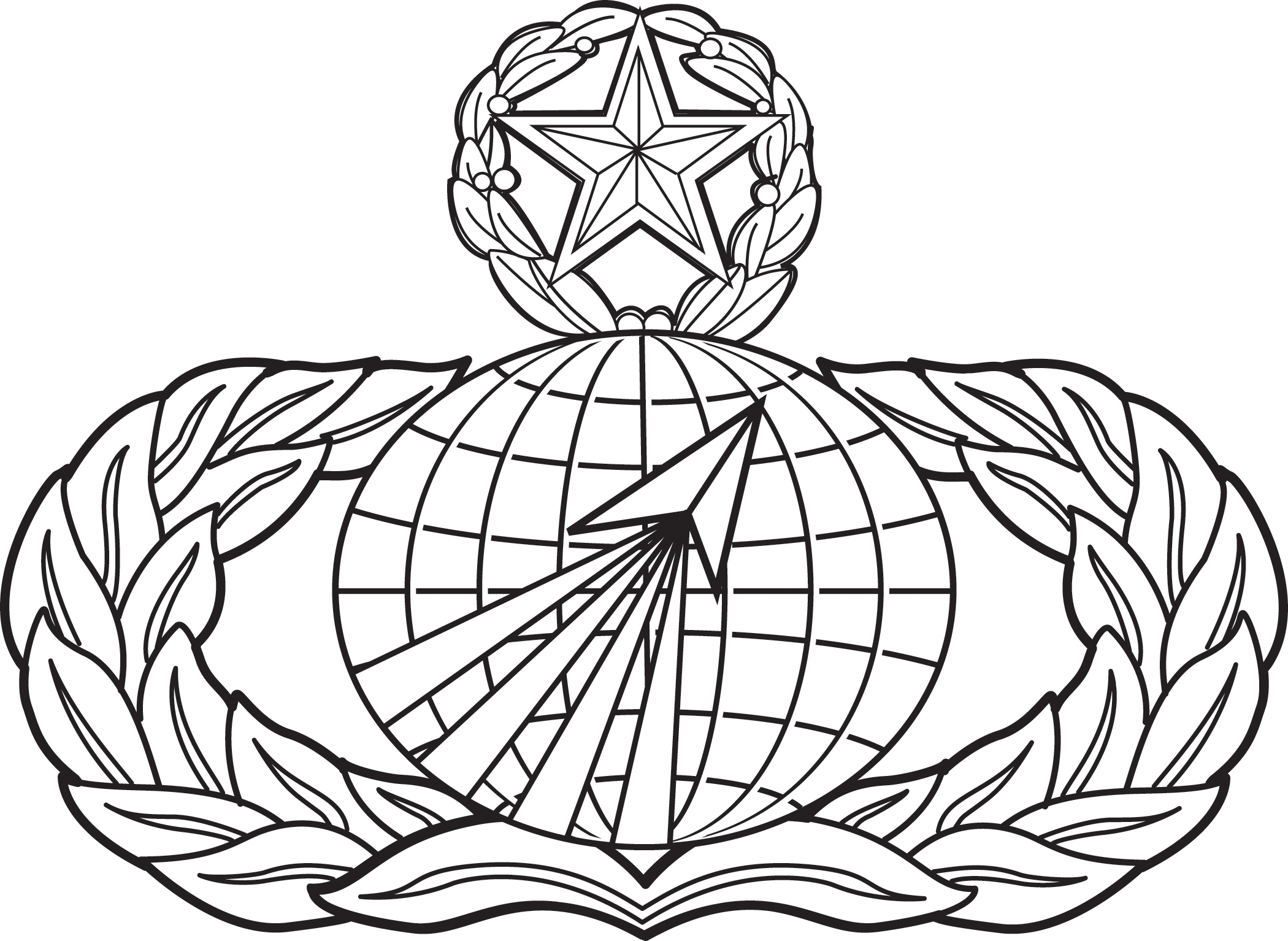

Master Space Operations Badge
Master Acquisitions and Financial Management Badge
U.S Air Force Distinguished Service Medal
Legion of Merit	Meritorious Service Medal with silver oak leaf cluster	Joint Service Commendation Medal
Air Force Commendation Medal with bronze oak leaf cluster	Air Force Achievement Medal with four oak leaf clusters	Air Force Meritorious Unite
Air and Space Outstanding Unit Award	Air and Space Organizational Excellence Award with two oak leaf clusters with bronze oak leaf cluster	U.S. Air Force Good Conduct Medal
Air and Space Recognition Ribbon	National Defense Service Medal with bronze service star	Armed Forces Expeditionary Medal with bronze service star
Southwest Asia Service Medal with bronze service star	Iraq Campaign Medal with bronze service star	Global War on Terrorism Service Medal
Nuclear Deterrence Operations Service Medal	Air and Space Overseas Long Tour Service Ribbon	Humanitarian Service Medal
Nuclear Deterrence Operations Service Medal	Air and Space Overseas Short Tour Service Ribbon	Air Force Expeditionary Service Ribbon w/ 1 oak leaf cluster and gold frame
Air and Space Longevity Service Award w/ 1 silver oak leaf cluster and 1 bronze oak leaf cluster	Small Arms Expert Marksmanship Ribbon	Air Force Training Ribbon w/ 1 bronze oak leaf cluster
Office of the Secretary of Defense Identification Badge
Headquarters Air Force badge
