= General Dynamics X-62 VISTA =

Experimental aircraft

X-62 VISTA
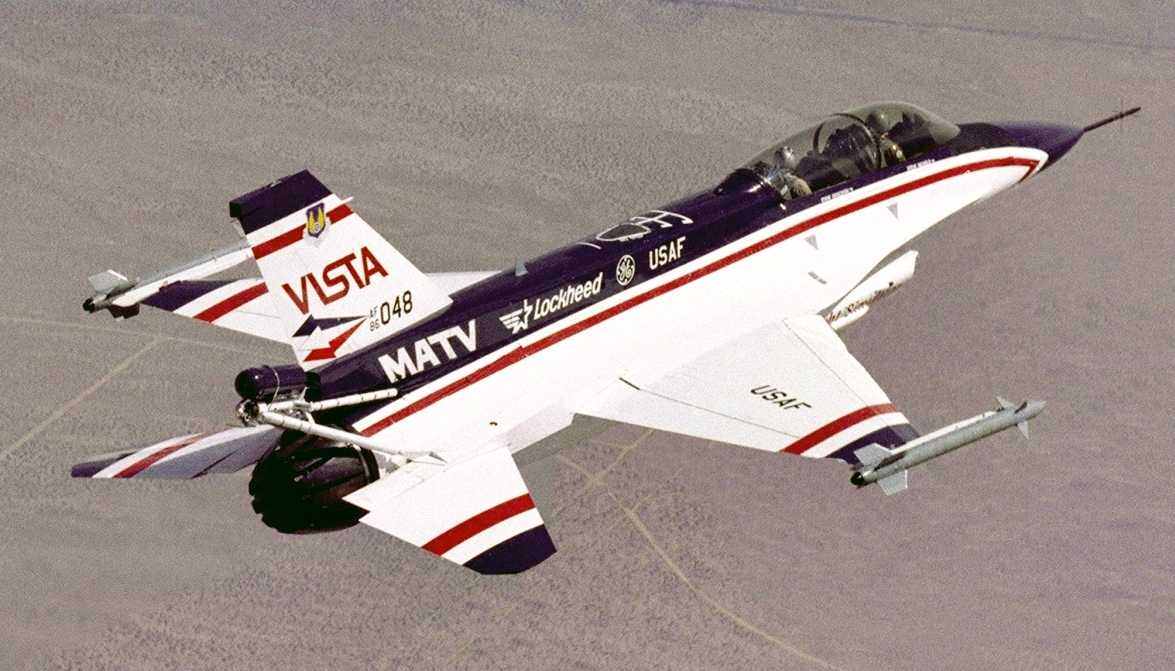
- The General Dynamics VISTA/MATV NF-16D

General information
- Type: Experimental aircraft
- Manufacturer: General Dynamics (later Lockheed Martin) and Calspan
- Primary user: United States Air Force
- Number built: 1

History
- First flight: April 1992
- Developed from: General Dynamics F-16 Fighting Falcon

The General Dynamics X-62 VISTA ("Variable Stability In-flight Simulator Test Aircraft") is an experimental aircraft used since 1992 by the United States Air Force (USAF). The aircraft, originally designated NF-16D, is an F-16D Fighting Falcon modified as a joint venture of General Dynamics and Calspan. In 2021, it was redesignated X-62A as part of an upgrade for use in the Skyborg program with System for Autonomous Control of Simulation (SACS).

The X-62A is also used by the Air Force Test Pilot School as a practice aircraft for test pilots.

== Design and development ==
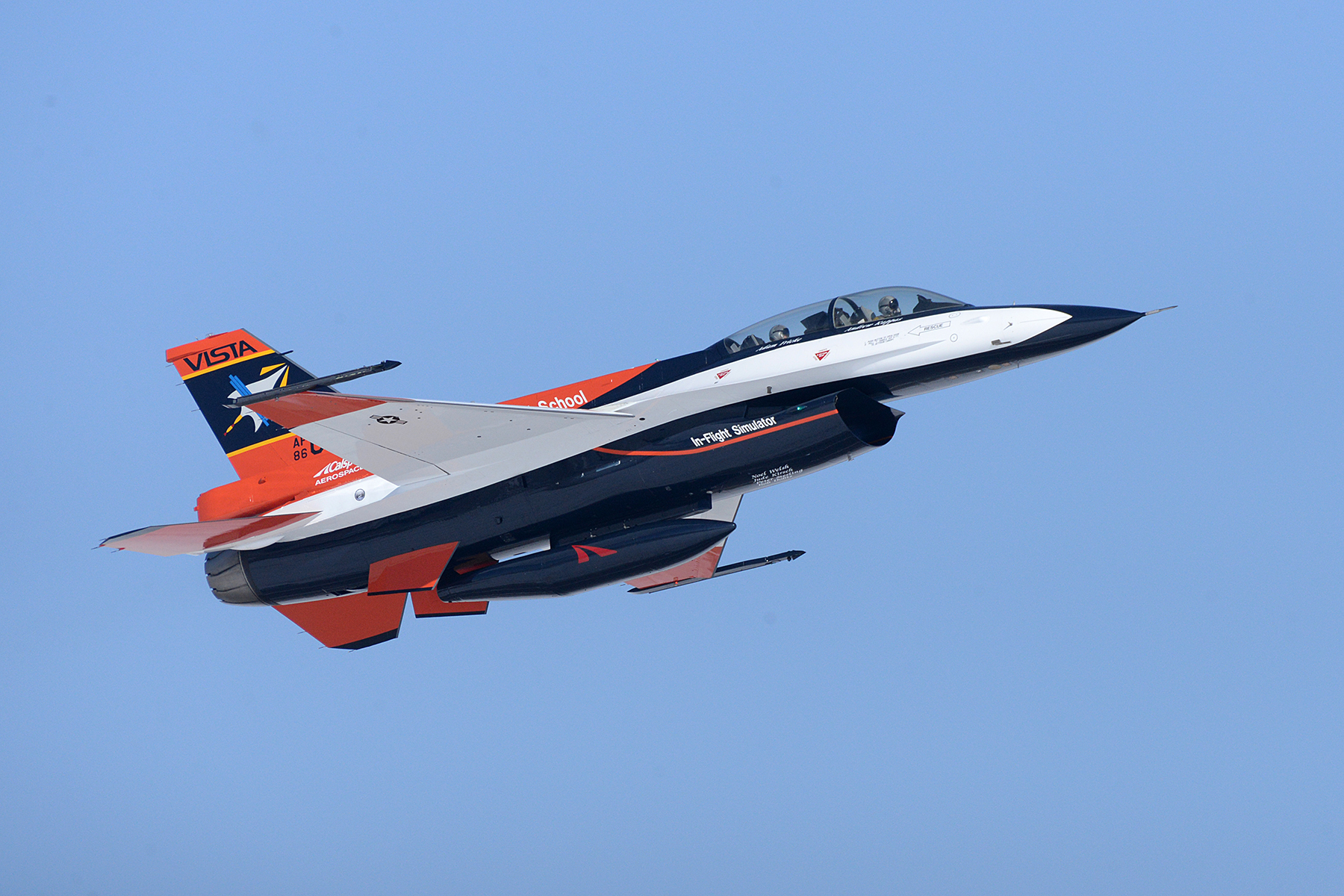
The NF-16D (now X-62A) VISTA in 2019, under a new paint scheme designed by Mike Machat

The NF-16D VISTA testbed aircraft incorporated a multi-axis thrust vectoring (MATV) engine nozzle that provides for more active control of the aircraft in a post-stall situation. As a result, the aircraft is supermaneuverable, retaining pitch and yaw control at angles of attack beyond which the traditional control surfaces cannot change attitude.

The NF-16D VISTA is a Block 30 F-16D based on the airframe design of the Israeli Air Force version, which incorporates a dorsal fairing running the length of the fuselage aft of the canopy and a heavyweight landing gear derived from the Block 40 F-16C/D. The fairing houses most of the variable-stability equipment and test instrumentation. The heavyweight gear permits simulation of aircraft with higher landing sink rates than a standard F-16.

The program was notable for the development of direct voice input and the "virtual HUD", which were both incorporated into the cockpit design for the F-35 Lightning II.

The VISTA aircraft is operated by the U.S. Air Force Test Pilot School and maintained by Calspan at Edwards Air Force Base. It is regularly used in student curriculum sorties, special academic projects, and flight research. As of June 2021, VISTA is in the midst of upgrading. In addition to replacing the VISTA Simulation System (VSS) with a newer, upgraded version of the same system, a System for Autonomous Control of Simulation (SACS) will be added in order to operate X-62A as a Skyborg. One application is as autonomously piloted aircraft, perhaps as a robotic wingman to a manned aircraft.

On 18 April 2024, the USAF and DARPA announced the successful engagement of the X-62A against a conventional, human piloted F-16 in the first-ever human vs artificial intelligence dogfight. On May 2, Air Force Secretary Frank Kendall III said he'd trust the AI with the ability to launch weapons. The Air Force is planning for more than 1,000 AI-controlled warplanes, the first of them to be operating by 2028.

== Specifications ==
Orthographically projected diagram of the F-16.

Data from USAF fact sheet AerospaceWeb

General characteristics

- Crew: 2 (pilot and safety pilot)
- Length: 48 ft 7 in (14.8 m)
- Wingspan: 32 ft 2 in (9.8 m)
- Height: 15 ft 9 in (4.8 m)
- Wing area: 300 sq ft (28 m^{2})
- Airfoil: NACA 64A204 root and tip
- Empty weight: 18,238 lb (8,273 kg)
- Gross weight: 26,463 lb (12,003 kg)
- Max takeoff weight: 42,300 lb (19,187 kg)
- Powerplant: 1 × General Electric F110-GE-100 afterburning turbofan, 16,600 lbf (74 kN) thrust dry, 28,200 lbf (125 kN) with afterburner

Performance

- Maximum speed: 1,170 kn (1,350 mph, 2,170 km/h)

At sea level: Mach 1.2 (915 mph, 1,460 km/h)
At altitude: Mach 2+

- Ferry range: 2,800 nmi (3,200 mi, 5,200 km) with 3× 370 US gal (1,401 L) drop tanks
- Service ceiling: 50,000 ft (15,000 m) +
- Rate of climb: 50,000 ft/min (250 m/s)
- Wing loading: 88.2 lb/sq ft (431 kg/m^{2})
- Thrust/weight: 1.095

== See also ==
Related development

- General Dynamics F-16 Fighting Falcon
- General Dynamics F-16XL
- QF-16

Aircraft of comparable role, configuration, and era

- High Alpha Research Vehicle
- McDonnell Douglas F-15 STOL/MTD
- Rockwell-MBB X-31

Related lists

- List of X-planes
