= List of active Russian military aircraft =

This is a list of Russian military aircraft in service across three branches of the Russian Armed Forces, as well as in the National Guard of Russia. The list inckudes Russia's experimental aircraft and those currently in development.

== Russian Aerospace Forces ==
Type	Origin	Class	Role	Introduced	Notes
Multirole/Fighter aircraft
Mikoyan MiG-29	Soviet Union	Jet	Fighter	1982	70 MiG-29A/S/MiG-29UB, 15 MiG-29SMT and 2 MiG-29UBT in service as of 2022. At least 256 MiG-29/35 combined in service according to World Air Forces, 2 on order
Mikoyan MiG-31	Soviet Union	Jet	Interceptor	1981	MiG-31B/BS/BM/BSM/K
Mikoyan MiG-35	Russia	Jet	Multirole	2019	6 MiG-35S/UB in service as of 2022.
Sukhoi Su-27	Soviet Union	Jet	Fighter	1985	12 Su-27, 18 Su-27UB, 47 Su-27SM and 24 Su-27SM3 in service as of 2022. At least 422 Su-27/30/35 combined in service according to World Air Forces.
Sukhoi Su-30	Russia	Jet	Multirole	2012	New deliveries were conducted in late 2023 and mid 2024. Su-30SM/SM2
Sukhoi Su-34	Russia	Jet	Fighter-bomber	2006	Su-34/M
Sukhoi Su-35	Russia	Jet	Multirole	2013	A total of 30 on order.
Sukhoi Su-57	Russia	Jet	Multirole	2020	A total of 52 on order As of December 2024, 29 have been delivered to the 929th State Flight Test Centre at Akhtubinsk and other bases, 29 produced and 10 prototypes.
Attack aircraft
Sukhoi Su-24	Soviet Union	Jet	Attack	1975	
Sukhoi Su-25	Soviet Union	Jet	Attack	1981	
Transport aircraft
Antonov An-12	Soviet Union	Propeller	Transport/Patrol	1959	
Antonov An-26	Soviet Union	Propeller	Transport/Patrol	1970	
Antonov An-72	Soviet Union	Jet	Transport	1977	
Antonov An-124	Soviet Union	Jet	Transport	1986	
Antonov An-140	Ukraine	Propeller	Transport	2002	
Antonov An-148	Ukraine	Jet	Transport	2009	
Ilyushin Il-18	Soviet Union	Propeller	Transport	1958	
Ilyushin Il-62	Soviet Union	Jet	Transport	1967	
Ilyushin Il-76	Soviet Union	Jet	Transport	1974	7 on order.
Tupolev Tu-134	Soviet Union	Jet	Transport/Trainer/Patrol	1967	
Tupolev Tu-154	Soviet Union	Jet	Transport	1970	
Let L-410 Turbolet	Czechoslovakia	Propeller	Transport/Trainer	1970	2 on order
Trainer aircraft
Diamond DA42	Austria	Propeller	Trainer	2017	
Aero L-39 Albatros	Czechoslovakia	Jet	Trainer	1974	L-39C
Yakovlev Yak-130	Russia	Jet	Trainer	2009	25 on order
Bombers
Tupolev Tu-22M	Soviet Union	Jet	Bomber	1973	
Tupolev Tu-95	Soviet Union	Turboprop	Bomber	1956	
Tupolev Tu-160	Soviet Union/Russia	Jet	Bomber	1987	10+40 on order, Two more Tu-160Ms to be added in 2022,4 more TU-160Ms to be added in 2023.
Special aircraft
Antonov An-30	Soviet Union	Propeller	Patrol	1970	.
Beriev A-50	Soviet Union	Jet	Command and control	1984	
Ilyushin Il-20/22	Soviet Union	Propeller	Patrol/Command and control	1969/1971	
Ilyushin Il-78	Soviet Union	Jet	Tanker	1984	31 on order
Ilyushin Il-80	Soviet Union	Jet	Command and control	1992	
Tupolev Tu-214	Russia	Jet	Command and control/ Reconnaissance	2013	
UCAV
Sokol Altius	Russia	Propeller	Attack/Reconnaissance	2021	
Helicopter
Kamov Ka-27	Soviet Union	Rotorcraft	Attack	1982	
Kamov Ka-52	Russia	Rotorcraft	Attack	2011	41 on order.
Kamov Ka-226	Russia	Rotorcraft	Utility	2003	
Kazan Ansat	Russia	Rotorcraft	Utility	2013	
Mil Mi-2	Poland	Rotorcraft	Transport	1965	
Mil Mi-8/Mi-17	Soviet Union/Russia	Rotorcraft	Transport/Utility	1967	
Mil Mi-24	Soviet Union/Russia	Rotorcraft	Attack	1972	
Mil Mi-26	Soviet Union/Russia	Rotorcraft	Transport	1983	15 on order
Mil Mi-28	Russia	Rotorcraft	Attack	2006	136 on order
Mil Mi-38	Russia	Rotorcraft	Transport	2019	2 on order
Eurocopter AS350/AS355	France	Rotorcraft	Utility	2006	

== Russian Naval Aviation ==
Type	Origin	Class	Role	Introduced	Notes
Multirole/Fighter aircraft
Sukhoi Su-30	Russia	Jet	Multirole	2012	22 Su-30SM in service. A total of 21 Su-30SM2 on order, 12 of which have entered service as of July 2023. Calculated based on 3 squadrons and including training fighters, there are approximately 72 or more aircraft. 12 Su-30SMs reported active with the 43rd Independent Naval Shturmovik [Assault Aviation] Regiment of the Black Sea Fleet as of 2021/22; In the Russo-Ukraine War, Ukraine claims seven destroyed as of August 2025.
Sukhoi Su-27	Soviet Union/Russia	Jet	Fighter	1985	Calculated based on 1 regiment and 3 squadrons, plus training fighters, there are more than 72 aircraft.
Sukhoi Su-33	Russia	Jet	Fighter Carrier-based	1998	Calculating about 48 aircraft using 2 squadrons.
Mikoyan MiG-29K	Russia	Jet	Multirole Carrier-based	2010	19 MiG-29KR and 3 MiG-29KUBR in service. Calculated based on 2 squadrons and including training fighters, there are approximately 48 or more aircraft.
Mikoyan MiG-31	Soviet Union	Jet	Interceptor	1981	10 MiG-31B/BS and 22 MiG-31BM in service. Calculated based on 2 Regiments 6 squadrons, there are approximately 144 aircraft.
Attack aircraft
Sukhoi Su-24	Soviet Union	Jet	Attack	1975	Reported Russian Su-24 losses in the Russo-Ukraine War, for both Russian naval aviation and Russian Aerospace Forces, said to amount to between 10 and 20 aircraft as of the end of 2024; reserve stocks of approximately 100 Su-24s may allow for losses to be absorbed, though Su-24 operations may have been curtailed due to the aging aircraft's vulnerability
Sukhoi Su-25UTG	Soviet Union	Jet	Attack/Trainer Carrier-based	1988	
Transport aircraft
Antonov An-24	Soviet Union	Propeller	Transport	1962	
Antonov An-26	Soviet Union	Propeller	Transport	1970	
Antonov An-72	Soviet Union	Jet	Transport	1977	
Antonov An-140	Ukraine	Propeller	Transport	2002	
Ilyushin Il-18D	Soviet Union	Propeller	Transport	1958	
Tupolev Tu-134	Soviet Union	Jet	Transport	1967	
Tupolev Tu-154	Soviet Union	Jet	Transport	1970	
Trainer aircraft
Aero L-39 Albatros	Czechoslovakia	Jet	Trainer	1974	
Yakovlev Yak-130	Russia	Jet	Trainer	2009	5 on order
Special aircraft
Antonov An-12	Soviet Union	Propeller	Patrol	1959	
Beriev Be-12	Soviet Union	Propeller	Patrol	1961	
Beriev Be-200	Russia	Jet	Patrol	2004	
Ilyushin Il-20	Soviet Union	Propeller	Command and control	1969	
Ilyushin Il-22	Soviet Union	Propeller	Command and control	1971	
Ilyushin Il-38	Soviet Union	Propeller	ASW/Patrol	1967	
Tupolev Tu-142	Soviet Union	Propeller	ASW/Patrol	1972	
Helicopter
Ka-27	Soviet Union	Rotorcraft	ASW/Patrol	1982	
Ka-28	Soviet Union	Rotorcraft	ASW/Patrol	1982	
Ka-29	Soviet Union	Rotorcraft	ASW/Patrol	1982	
Kamov Ka-31	Russia	Rotorcraft	AWAC	1995	
Kamov Ka-52K	Russia	Rotorcraft	Attack	2015	
Mil Mi-8	Soviet Union	Rotorcraft	Transport	1967	
Mi-24	Soviet Union/Russia	Rotorcraft	Attack	1972	

== Russian National Guard ==
Model	Image	Origin	Type	Details
Aircraft
Ilyushin Il-76		Soviet Union	Military transport aircraft	N/A
Antonov An-26		Soviet Union	Military transport aircraft	N/A
Antonov An-72		Soviet Union	Military transport aircraft	N/A
Antonov An-12		Soviet Union	Military transport aircraft	N/A
Helicopter
Eurocopter AS355N Écureuil		France	Light utility helicopter	In service with the Alpha Group.
Mil Mi-8/17		Soviet Union Russia	Transport helicopters	60 helicopters in service.
Mil Mi-26		Soviet Union	Transport helicopters	N/A
Mil Mi-24		Soviet Union	Attack helicopter	N/A

== Russian Ground Forces ==
Type	Origin	Class	Role	Introduced	Notes
UAV/UCAV
Arash 2	Iran	Jet	Loitering munition	2022	
Eleron	Russia	Propeller	Reconnaissance	2003	
Eleron-3SW	Russia	Propeller	Reconnaissance	2012	
Eleron-10	Russia	Propeller	Reconnaissance	2011	
IAI Searcher 2 / Forpost	Israel / Russia	Propeller	Attack/Reconnaissance	2010	
Geran-1	Iran	Propeller	Loitering munition	2022	
Geran-2	Iran	Propeller	Loitering munition	2022	
Kronshtadt Orion	Russia	Propeller	Attack/Reconnaissance	2019	
Granat-2	Russia	Propeller	Reconnaissance		
Granat-4	Russia	Propeller	Reconnaissance		
Grusha	Russia	Propeller	Reconnaissance		
IAI Bird-Eye 400 / Zastava	Israel	Propeller	Reconnaissance	2010	
Navodchik-2	Russia	Propeller	Reconnaissance		
Orlan-10	Russia	Propeller	Reconnaissance	2010	
Shahed 129	Iran	Jet	Attack		
Takhion	Russia	Propeller	Reconnaissance		
Tipchak	Russia	Propeller	Reconnaissance	2008	
Tupolev Tu-143	Russia	Jet	Reconnaissance	1994	
Yakovlev Pchela	Russia	Propeller	Reconnaissance	1990	
ZALA Kub	Russia	Propeller	Loitering munition	2019	
ZALA Lancet	Russia	Propeller	Loitering munition	2019	
ZALA 421-08	Russia	Propeller	Reconnaissance	2008	
Qods Mohajer-6	Iran	Propeller	ISTAR		
Aerial target
E95M	Russia	Target drone	combat training for troops / testing of air defence		
DAN/Dan-M	Russia	Target drone	combat training for troops / testing of air defence		
9F6021 Adyutant	Russia	Target drone system	combat training for troops / testing of air defence		

== Russian Air Force ==
Emblem of the Russian Air Force

Emblem of the Russian Aerospace Forces

This is a list of the military aircraft currently in service with the Russian Air Force as of 2025. It belongs to the Russian Aerospace Forces, established on 1 August 2015, after the merging of the Russian Air Force and the Russian Aerospace Defence Forces.

Aircraft		Origin	Type	Variant	In service	Notes
Combat Aircraft
	Sukhoi Su-57	Russia	stealth multirole		29	78 on order
A Russian Air Force Su-35S	Sukhoi Su-35	Russia	air superiority	Su-35S	118+	As of 28 May 2024 at least 7 Su-35S have been lost in the Russian Invasion of Ukraine.
A Russian Air Force Su-34	Sukhoi Su-34	Russia	multirole		142-163+	As of 27 July 2024 at least 27 Su-34 and one Su-34M have been lost in the Russian Invasion of Ukraine.
	Sukhoi Su-30	Russia	multirole	Su-30SM/M2	110+	91 Su-30SM and 19 Su-30M2 in service as of 2022 and new deliveries were conducted in late 2023 and mid 2024. As of 28 May 2024 at least 11 Su-30SM have been lost in the Russian Invasion of Ukraine.
	Mikoyan MiG-35	Russia	multirole	MiG-35S/UB	6	
	Mikoyan MiG-31	USSR	interceptor / attack	MiG-31BM/BSM/K	128-247	
	Mikoyan MiG-29	USSR/Russia	air superiority	MiG-29S/UB/SMT/UBT	256	To be replaced by the MiG-35
	Sukhoi Su-27	USSR/Russia	air superiority	Su-27P/UB/SM/SM3	<422	
	Sukhoi Su-25	USSR	attack	Su-25/UB/SM/SM3	175	
	Sukhoi Su-24	USSR	attack	Su-24M/M2	259	To be replaced by the Su-34. 1x Su-24 of Russia's Africa Corps shot down over Gao, Mali.
A Tu-160 during the 2018 Victory Day Parade	Tupolev Tu-160	USSR/Russia	strategic bomber	Tu-160/M	17	10+40 on order
	Tupolev Tu-95	USSR	strategic bomber	Tu-95MS/MS16	46	3x Tu-95MS destroyed plus 1x damaged by Ukraine SBU attack on Olenya airbase; 3x Tu-95MS destroyed plus 1x damaged by Ukraine SBU attack on Belyay airbase; 1x Tu-95MS strategic bomber destroyed by Ukrainian SBU drones at Engels Air Base
	Tupolev Tu-22M	USSR	strategic bomber	Tu-22M3/M3M	55	1x Tu-22 destroyed at Soltsy airfield, 19 Aug 2023; 1x Tu-22 crashed after shot by Ukrainian air defense, mid Apr 2024; 4x Tu-22M3 destroyed by Ukraine SBU attack on Belaya airbase, 1 Jun 2025; 1x Tu-22M3 crashed during training mission, 15 June 2026
AWACS
A Beriev A-50 in flight	Beriev A-50	USSR	AWACS	A-50/U	12	7 modernized to A-50U; 1x A-50 damaged by BYPOL in Belarus, 26 Feb 2023; 2x A-50 shot down by Ukraine air defense, 14 Jan 2024 and 23 Feb 2024; 1x A-50 damaged by Ukraine SBU attack on Ivanovo airbase, 1 Jun 2025
	Ilyushin Il-80	USSR	command and control		3	
	Ilyushin Il-76	USSR	command and control	Il-82	1	
	Ilyushin Il-18V	USSR	command and control	Il-18/20/22/M	15	
Electronic Warfare
	Antonov An-12	USSR	radar jamming	An-12PP	4	
	Ilyushin Il-22	USSR	radar jamming	Il-22PP	3	
Reconnaissance
	Antonov An-30	USSR	reconnaissance		16	
	Ilyushin Il-20	USSR	SIGINT / ELINT	Il-20/M	12	
	Tupolev Tu-214	Russia	reconnaissance	Tu-214ON/PU-SBUS	4	
A Tu-214R taking off from Borisoglebskoye Airfield	Tupolev Tu-214R	Russia	SIGINT / ELINT	Tu-214R	2	
Tanker
An Il-78M of the 203rd Guards Air Refuelling Regiment	Ilyushin Il-78	USSR	air refueling	Il-78/M	20	10+21 on order, 1 modernized to Il-78M2
Transport
	Antonov An-12	USSR	transport	An-12B/BK	55	
	Antonov An-22	USSR	transport	An-22A	4	
	Antonov An-26	USSR	transport		115	
	Antonov An-72	USSR	transport	An-72/P	31	
An An-124-100 accompanied by a Su-27UB	Antonov An-124	USSR	strategic airlifter	An-124-100	5	
	Antonov An-140	Ukraine/Russia	transport	An-140-100	3	
	Antonov An-148	Ukraine/Russia	VIP transport	An-148-100E	15	
	Ilyushin Il-18	USSR	transport	Il-18D/V	3	
	Ilyushin Il-62	USSR/Russia	VIP transport	Il-62M	7	
	Ilyushin Il-76	USSR/Russia	strategic airlifter	Il-76M/MD/MD-M/MD-90A	130	7 on order
	Let L-410 Turbolet	Czechoslovakia	transport		53	2 on order
	Tupolev Tu-134	USSR	transport		6	
	Tupolev Tu-154	USSR	transport	Tu-154B-2/M	3	
Helicopter
	Eurocopter AS350 / AS355	France	utility		2	
	Kazan Ansat	Russia	utility	Ansat-U	50	
	Kamov Ka-27	USSR	attack		6	
A Russian Air Force Ka-52 in flight	Kamov Ka-52	Russia	attack		135	16+25 on order
	Kamov Ka-226	Russia	utility		36	
	Mil Mi-8 / Mi-17	USSR/Russia	attack / transport		777	10 on order
	Mil Mi-24	USSR/Russia	attack / transport		323	
	Mil Mi-26	USSR/Russia	transport	Mi-26/T	45	15 on order
	Mil Mi-28	Russia	attack	Mi-28N/NM	94	98 on order
	Mil Mi-38	Russia	transport	Mi-38T	2	2 on order
Trainer
	Aero L-39 Albatros	Czechoslovakia	trainer		182	
	Diamond DA42	Austria	trainer		34	
	Mil Mi-2	Polish People's Republic	trainer		43	
	Mi-28UB	Russia	trainer / attack	Mi-28UB	19	4+36 on order
	Tu-134UBL	USSR	trainer	Tu-134UBL	37	Tu-160 trainer
A Yak-130 at the 2012 Farnborough International Airshow	Yakovlev Yak-130	Russia	trainer / attack		123	14 on order
	Yakovlev Yak-152	Russia	trainer			150 on order

== Developmental aircraft ==
Type	Origin	Class	Role	Introduced	In service	Notes
Alekseyev Orlan	Russia	Jet	Ekranoplan	2027		
Beriev A-100	Russia	Jet	Command and control	2018	2026	To replace the A-50
Gunship	Russia	Propeller	Close air support			Similar to the Lockheed AC-130
Ilyushin Il-78M-90A	Russia	Jet	Tanker	2017	2021	10 on order
Ilyushin Il-96-400TZ	Russia	Jet	Tanker			Likely canceled. Based on the Il-96-400T freighter
Ilushin Il-212	Russia	Jet	Transport	2019	2021	To replace the An-26 and An-72
Ilyushin Il-106 PAK VTA	Russia	Jet	Transport	2024–2026		To replace the An-124 and An-22
Kamov Ka-60	Russia	Rotorcraft	Transport/Utility			
Kamov Ka-65	Russia	Rotorcraft	ASW			
Kronstadt Orion-2 (Helios)	Russia	Propeller	Attack/Reconnaissance	2023		
Kronstadt Sirius	Russia	Propeller	Attack/Reconnaissance	2022	2023	
Luch Korsar	Russia	Propeller	Attack/Reconnaissance	2015	2018	It includes also an upgraded variant
Mikoyan MiG-41	Russia	Jet	Fighter			To replace the MiG-31
Mikoyan MiG-UTS	Russia	Jet	Trainer			To replace the aging fleet of L-39 Albatros
SibNIA "Partizan"	Russia	Propeller	Transport/UAV	2024		Very short take-off and landing transport unmanned aircraft, based on the TVS-2-DTS developed by SibNIA.
Sokol heavy striker drone	Russia	Jet	Attack/Reconnaissance			Project only. Similar to the General Atomics Avenger
Sukhoi Su-75 Checkmate	Russia	Jet	Multirole	2024		Single engine fifth-generation multirole fighter
Sukhoi PAK ShA	Russia	Jet	Ground attack			Project only. For a combat aviation complex to replace the Su-25 after 2030
Sukhoi S-70 Okhotnik-B	Russia	Jet	Attack/Reconnaissance	2019	2024	
Tupolev PAK DA	Russia	Jet	Bomber	2024	2027	
Yakovlev VTOL fighter	Russia	Jet	Carrier-based fighter			Project only. Planned VTOL fighter for possible future Russian aircraft carrier program

== Experimental aircraft ==
Aircraft	Origin	Class	Role	Notes
Beriev A-60	Russia	Jet	Experimental	Airborne laser weapon under the Sokol Eshelon program.
Mikoyan Project 1.44	Russia	Jet	Experimental	Proposed fifth-generation jet fighter.
Sukhoi Su-37	Russia	Jet	Experimental	Supermaneuverable multirole demonstrator.
Sukhoi Su-47	Russia	Jet	Experimental	Technology demonstrator which showcased many technologies now used in the Sukhoi Su-57.

== See also ==
- Russian presidential aircraft
- List of military aircraft of the Soviet Union and the CIS
- Lists of currently active military equipment by country
- List of Russian aircraft losses during the Russo-Ukrainian War
