= Kronshtadt Helios-RLD =

Russian combat drone

Helios-RLD
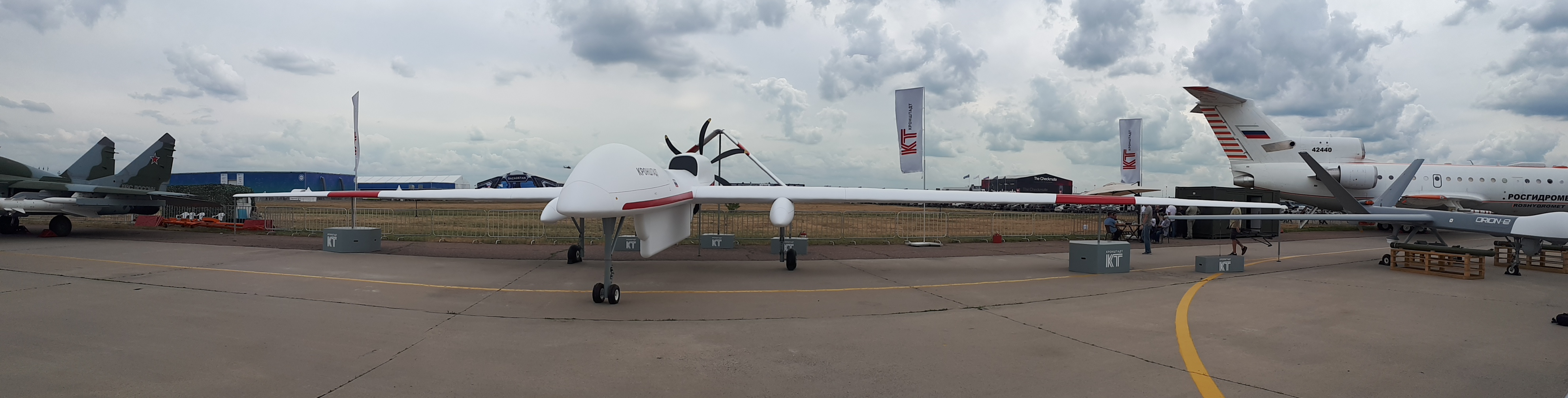
- Helios-RLD at the MAKS-2021 exhibition

General information
- Type: Unmanned surveillance and reconnaissance aerial vehicle
- National origin: Russia
- Designer: Kronshtadt
- Status: In development
- Primary user: Russian Aerospace Forces

Helios-RLD (Russian: Гелиос-РЛД) is a Russian unmanned surveillance and reconnaissance aerial vehicle being developed by the Russian Kronshtadt Group.

It represents the further development of the Orion drone, is a radar surveillance drone and, according to the manufacturer, will be able to work in a team with A-50 and A-100 AWACS aircraft.

== History ==
The prototype of the Helios-RLD drone was first demonstrated in the Patriot Park at the ARMY-2020 forum. Helios is a radar surveillance drone. The UAV was also demonstrated at the MAKS-2021 aerospace show.

== Specifications ==
Data from TASS

General characteristics

- Crew: None
- Length: 12.6 m (41 ft 4 in)
- Wingspan: 30 m (98 ft 5 in)
- Height: 3.6 m (11 ft 10 in)
- Max takeoff weight: 4,000 kg (8,818 lb)

Performance

- Cruise speed: 350–450 km/h (220–280 mph, 190–240 kn)
- Range: 800 km (500 mi, 430 nmi)
- Service ceiling: 9,000–11,000 m (30,000–36,000 ft)
