= Kronshtadt Sirius =

Russian UCAV under development

Sirius Сириус
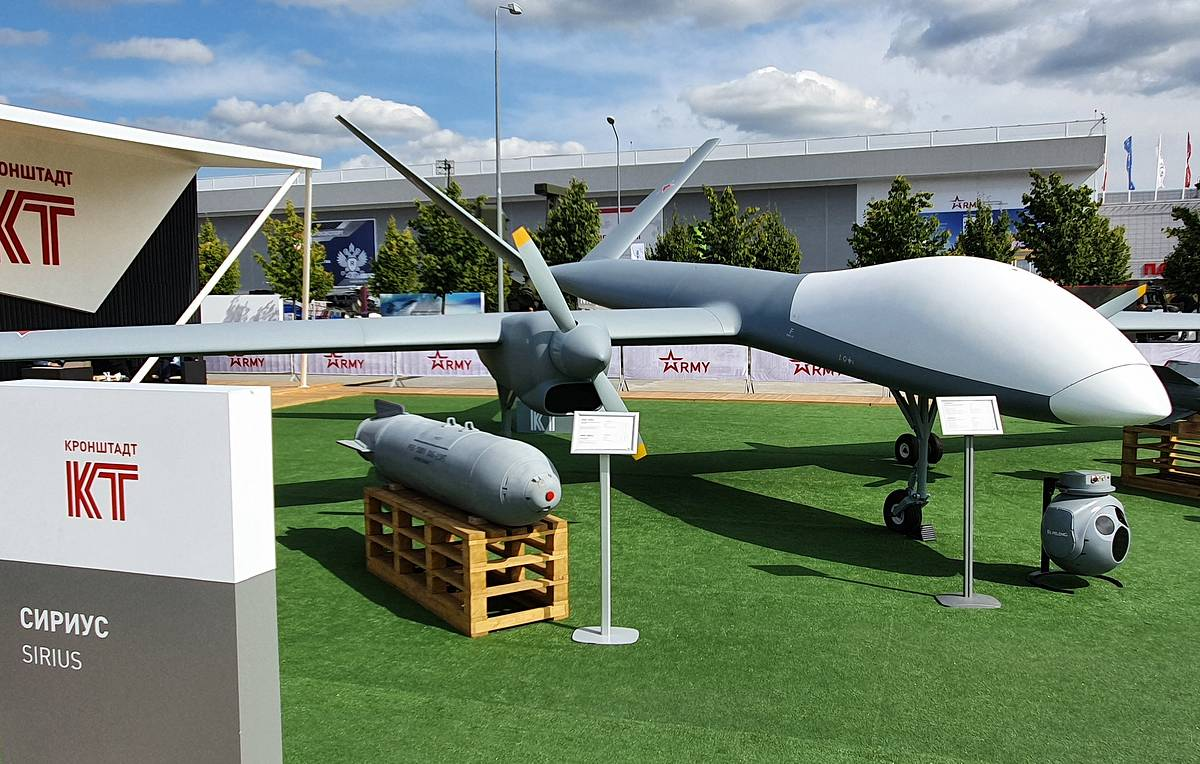
- Sirius at the Army exhibition

General information
- Type: Unmanned combat aerial vehicle
- National origin: Russia
- Designer: Kronshtadt
- Status: In development
- Primary user: Russian Aerospace Forces

History
- First flight: 2023
- Developed from: Orion

Sirius (Russian: Сириус) is a Russian UCAV under development by the Russian company Kronshtadt Group, a further development of the Orion drone.

== History ==
The scale model was presented for the first time in 2019 at the MAKS-2019 air show.

On November 9, 2021, the start of assembly of a prototype of the drone was announced.

On August 24, 2021, the Russian Ministry of Defense signed a contract with the Kronstadt company for the supply of the Sirius drones.

On January 27, 2022, the Russian Ministry of Defense announced that deliveries of Sirius drones would begin in 2023.

By August 2023, Sirius made its first flight.

== Description ==
Sirius is equipped with two turboprop engines. "Sirius" is a development of light Orion drones.

Sirius will be able to carry KAB-100, FAB-100 high-explosive aerial bombs, RBK-500U free-fall bombs, and ODAB-500PMV volumetric detonating aerial bomb.

== Specifications ==
Data from TASS

General characteristics

- Crew: None
- Length: 9 m (29 ft 6 in)
- Wingspan: 20 m (65 ft 7 in)
- Max takeoff weight: 2,500 kg (5,512 lb)

Performance

- Cruise speed: 180 km/h (110 mph, 97 kn)
- Service ceiling: 7,700 m (25,300 ft)

== See also ==
- Kronshtadt Orion
