= Banderol =

Banderol, package or small parcel in Russian, can refer to:

- Speech scroll, also known as a Banderol
- S8000 Banderol, a Russian cruise missile

== See also ==
- Banderole
