= Korsar =

Korsar may refer to:

- Luch Korsar, Russian unmanned aerial vehicle designed by OKB Luch
- RK-3 Corsar, Ukrainian antitank missile designed by DerzhKKB Luch
