= ENICS Eleron-10 =

Russian reconnaissance UAV

The ENICS Eleron-10 (ЭНИКС Элерон-10 in Russian) is a medium-range reconnaissance UAV for 24/7 surveillance, developed by the Russian company ENICS.

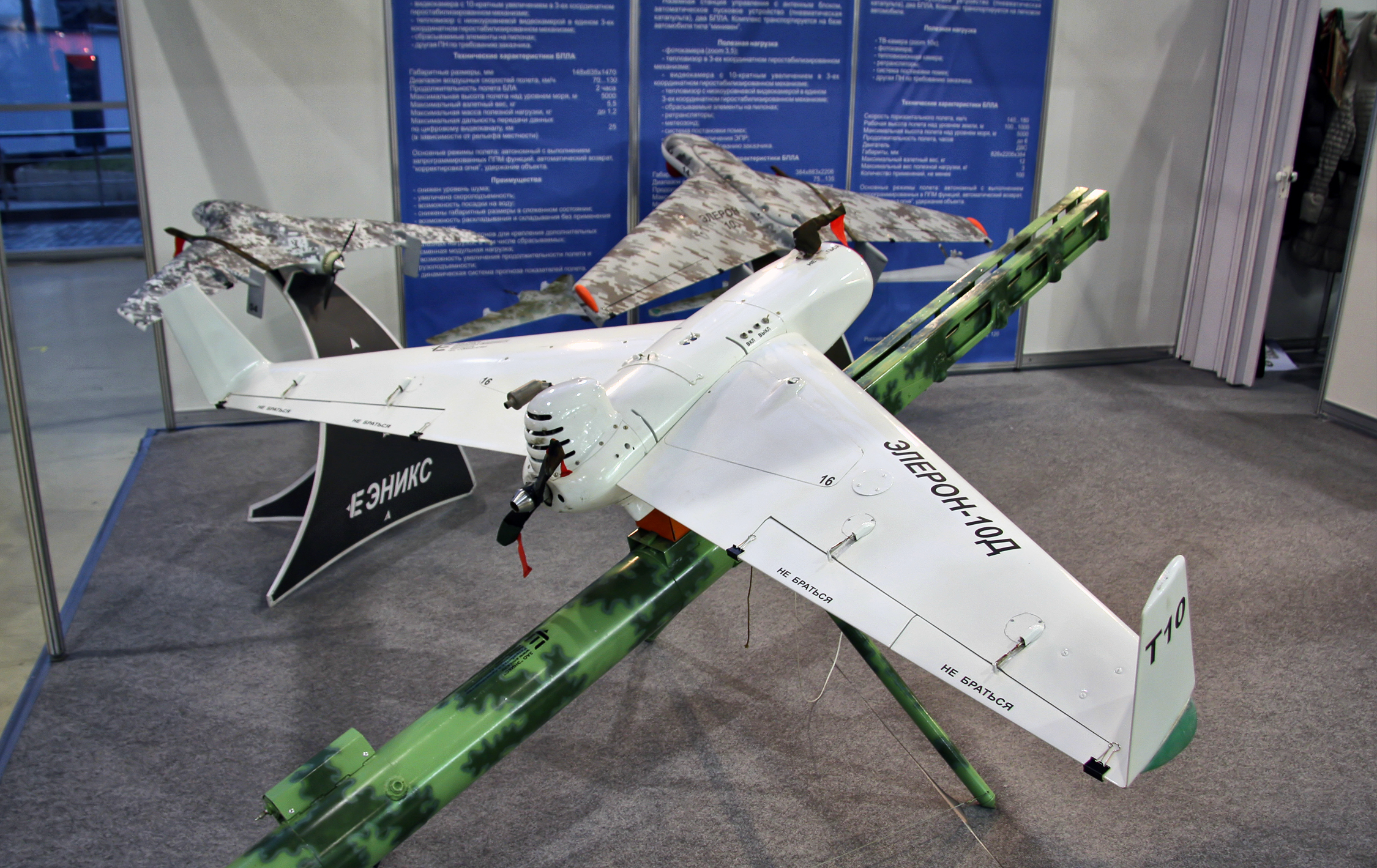
Eleron-10 at the Interpolitex exhibition, 2011

== History ==
The Russian word eleron (Элерон) means aileron.

The Eleron-10 was designed by ENICS to perform 24/7 surveillance, and in particular border control, coast guards, road and railway monitoring, and search and rescue operations.

The first prototype of the drone was developed and manufactured by ENICS on 8 January 2011 as a successor to the smaller Eleron-3. It was shown publicly for the first time in 2011 during the international trade fair "Integrated Security".

The Eleron-10 was procured by the Russian armed forces in 2012, alongside the Eleron-3. The Eleron-10SV model was used by the Russian Interior Ministry to survey an arsenal fire in the village of Urman, in Bashkortostan near Ufa. The "Valdai" model has been used by the Russian FSB. An Eleron-10D has been produced, which has longer distance observation capabilities.

== Characteristics ==
The Eleron-10 has several flight modes:

- Autonomous: The drone flies the route independently and carries out preplanned functions.
- Automatic: The drone flies the route independently.
- Maintenance: The drone hovers or flies around a fixed point.
- Manual
