= EDM4S =

Lithuanian anti-drone device

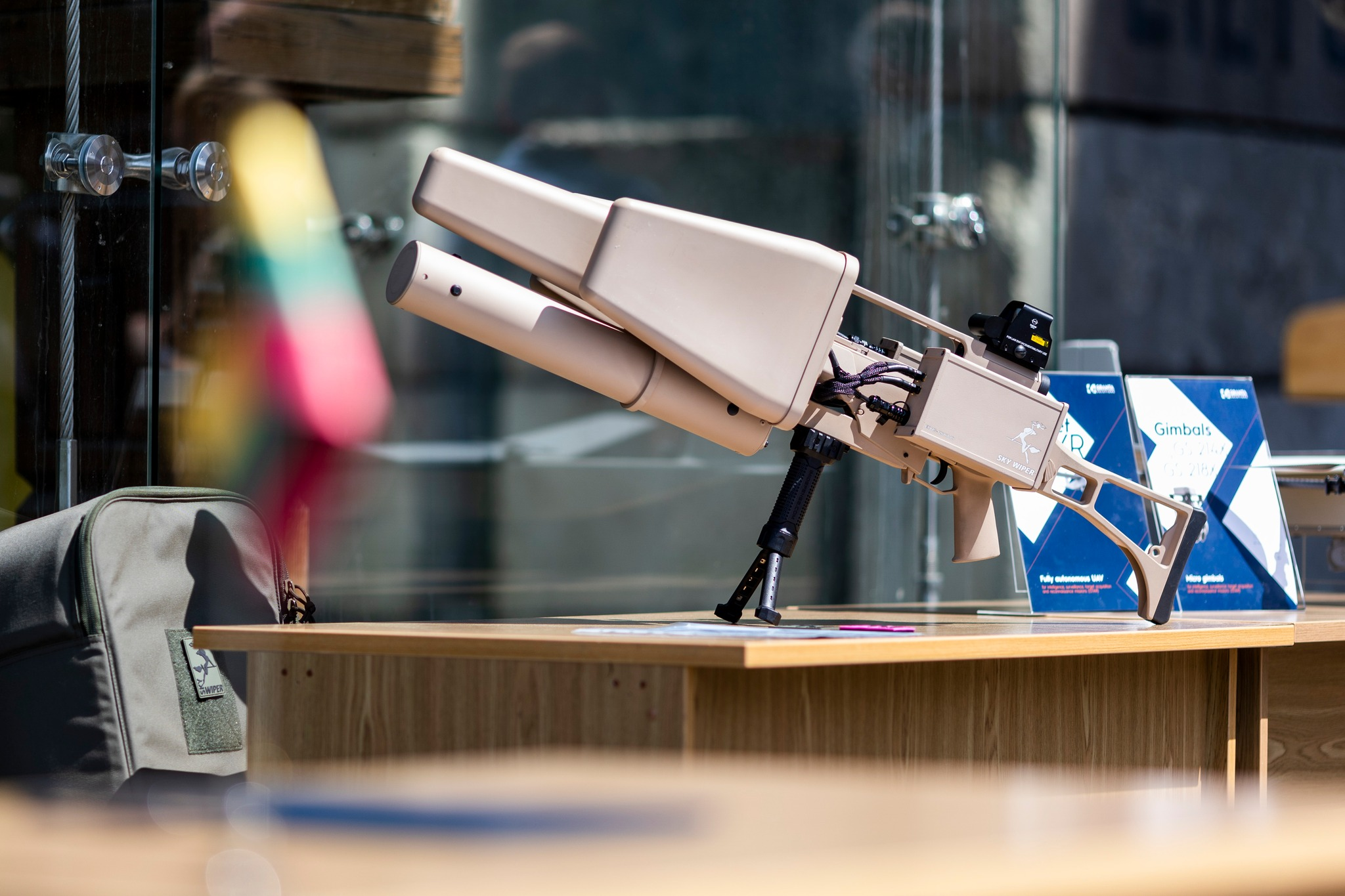
- Type: Portable anti-drone weapon
- Place of origin: Lithuania

Service history
- In service: 2021–present
- Used by: See Operators
- Wars: Russo-Ukrainian War

Production history
- Designer: NT Service UAB
- Designed: c. 2018
- Unit cost: around $15,000
- Variants: EDM4S-UA; Skylock Skybeam

Specifications
- Mass: 5.5 kg (12 lb)
- Length: 1,050 mm (41 in)
- Width: 220 mm (8.7 in)
- Height: 360 mm (14 in)
- Effective firing range: 3–5 km (1.9–3.1 mi)

The EDM4S or EDM4S SkyWiper (Electronic Drone Mitigation 4 - System), is a portable electronic warfare anti-drone device produced and developed by the Lithuanian company NT Service. It is designed to disrupt small and medium sized UAVs by jamming their communication and satellite navigation systems with an electromagnetic pulse.

== History ==
The device was first shown by the company NT Service (based in Kaunas, Lithuania) in the 2019 Security and Counter Terror Exhibition in London. In partnership with Israeli company Skylock, NT Service also produces the system under the name "Skybeam."

== Description ==
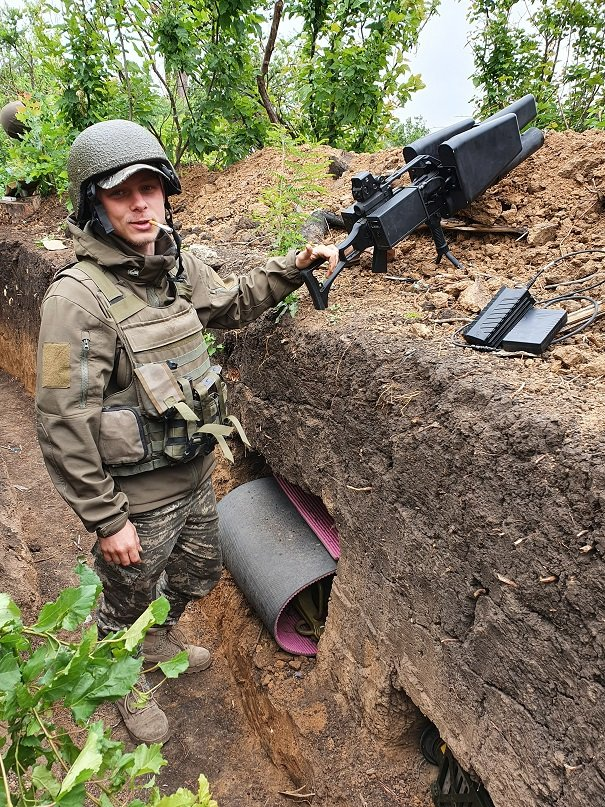
Ukrainian soldier with an EDM4S anti-drone rifle during the 2022 Russian invasion of Ukraine

The device can be carried by one person. The operator points the device at the UAV and activates it to disrupt the UAV's communications out to a range of 3–5 km (2–3 mi), as well as its satellite navigation capabilities. Depending on the UAV's level of autonomy, it may then fall out of the sky, make a controlled landing, return to an earlier waypoint, or continue operating normally.

The device can have 4 or 6 antennas. By default there are two antennas for the 2.4 GHz and 5.8 GHz frequency bands, with a power of 10 W each, one antenna for the GPS 1.5 GHz band with a power of 10 W, and one antenna for the GLONASS 1.5 GHz band with a power of 10 W.

The device is made of aluminium, with the "gun" portion being modelled after the Heckler & Koch G36 rifle – including a trigger to activate the device and optics for sighting. It weighs 5.5 kg and measures 1050 × 220 × 360 mm with the stock extended (830 × 220 × 360 mm without the stock extended). It is powered by a 24 V battery, which can last for up to 60 minutes.

== Operational history ==
The EDM4S-UA version of the device – at a unit cost of US$15,000 – was first used by the Ukrainian Armed Forces against the Russian separatist drones in Donbas in 2021 as part of the Russo-Ukrainian War. It has since seen further use in the Russian invasion of Ukraine, neutralizing the Russian drones such as the Eleron-3. In June 2022, Lithuania donated 110 units to Ukraine at a cost of €1.5 million (US$1.56 million).

== Operators ==
Current operators

Lithuania

- Lithuanian Armed Forces

Ukraine

- Ukrainian Armed Forces: EDM4S-UA

Romania

- Romanian Armed Forces: Skylock Skybeam

Nigeria

- Nigerian Armed Forces: EDM4S SkyWiper

== See also ==
- Drone warfare
