= Unmanned surveillance and reconnaissance aerial vehicle =

Unmanned aerial vehicle that performs reconnaissance duties

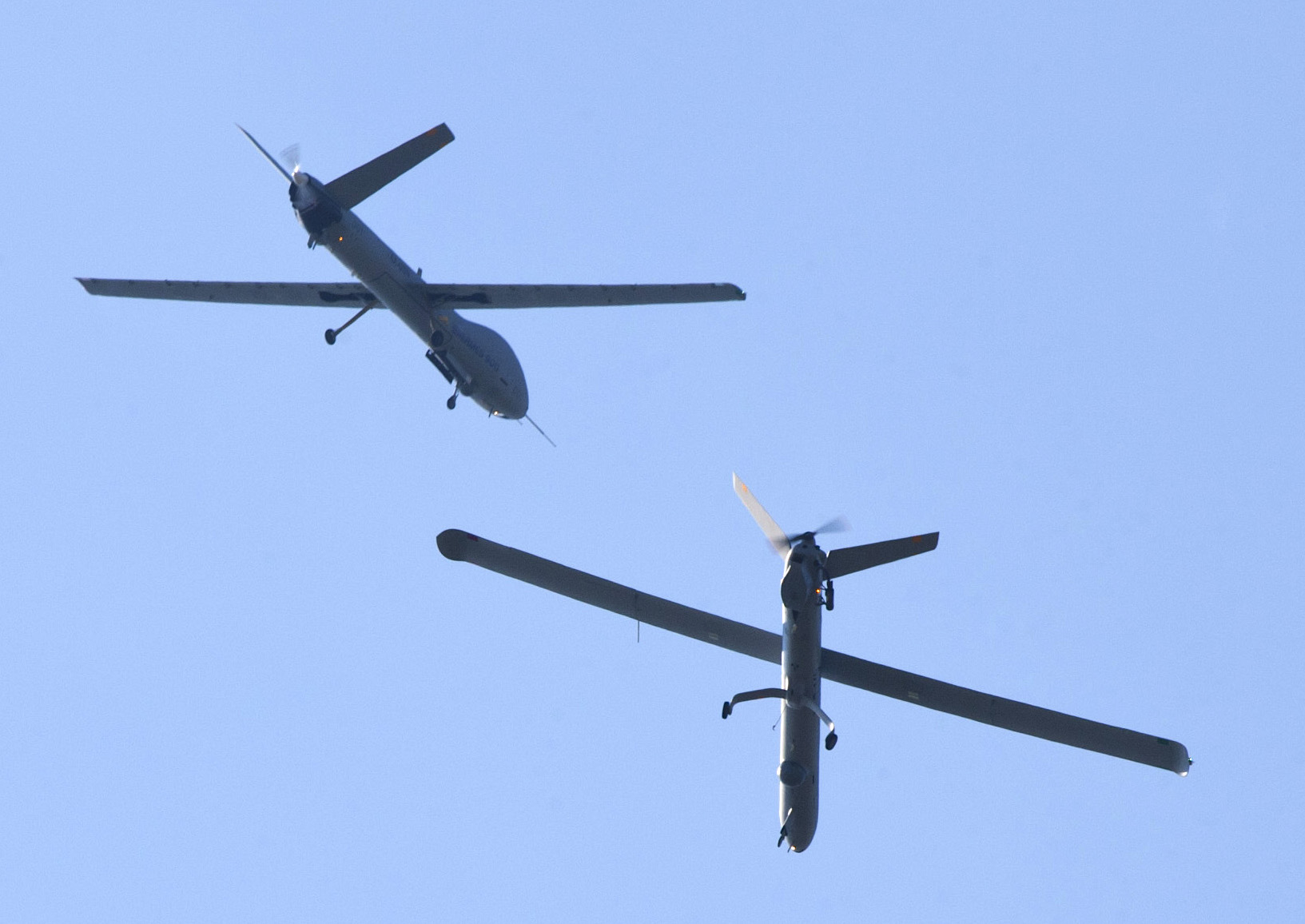
Israeli-made Elbit Hermes 900 & Elbit Hermes 450 unmanned aerial vehicle used by several militaries for reconnaissance and surveillance

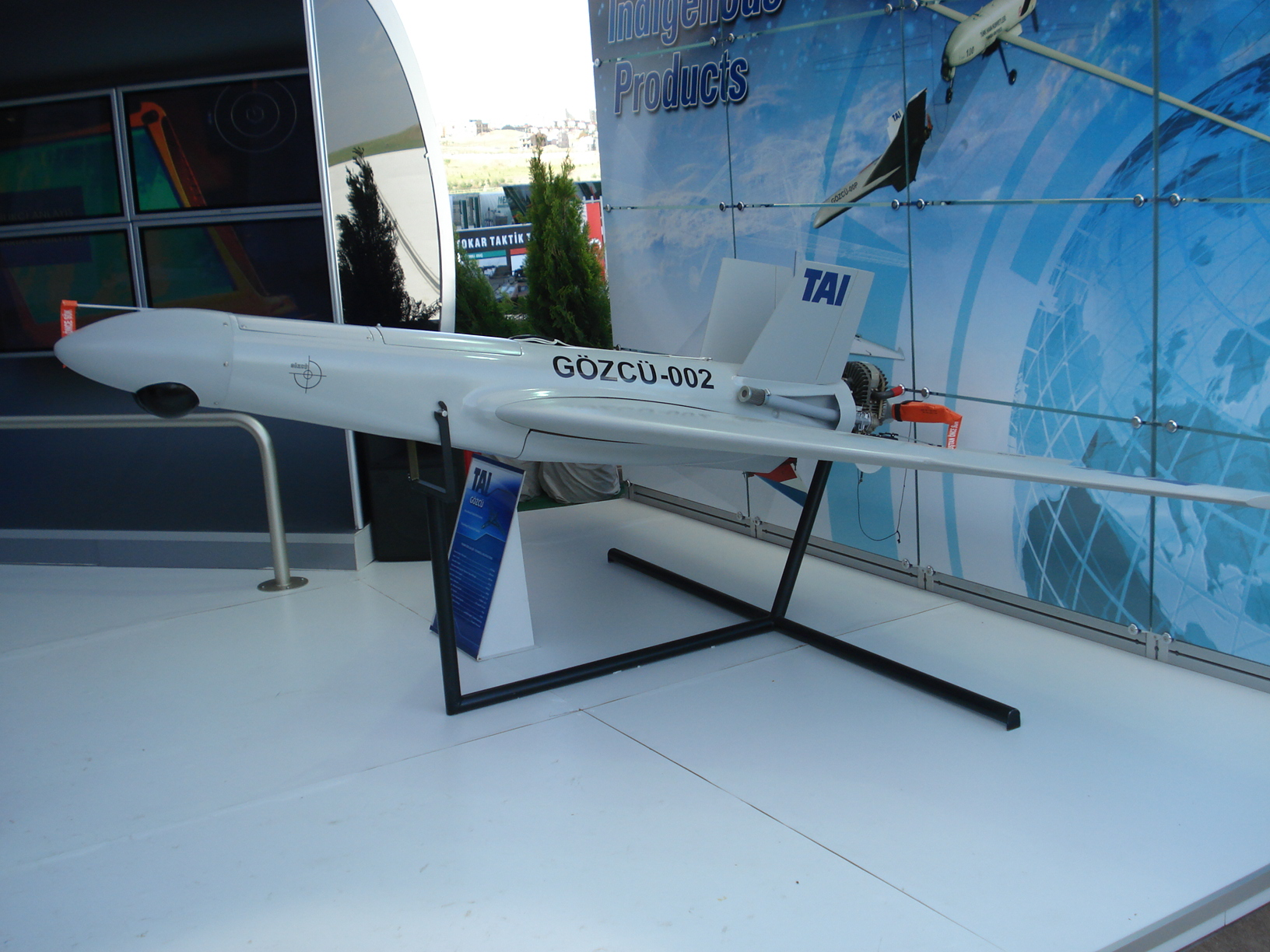
Turkish TAI Gözcü used for reconnaissance and surveillance

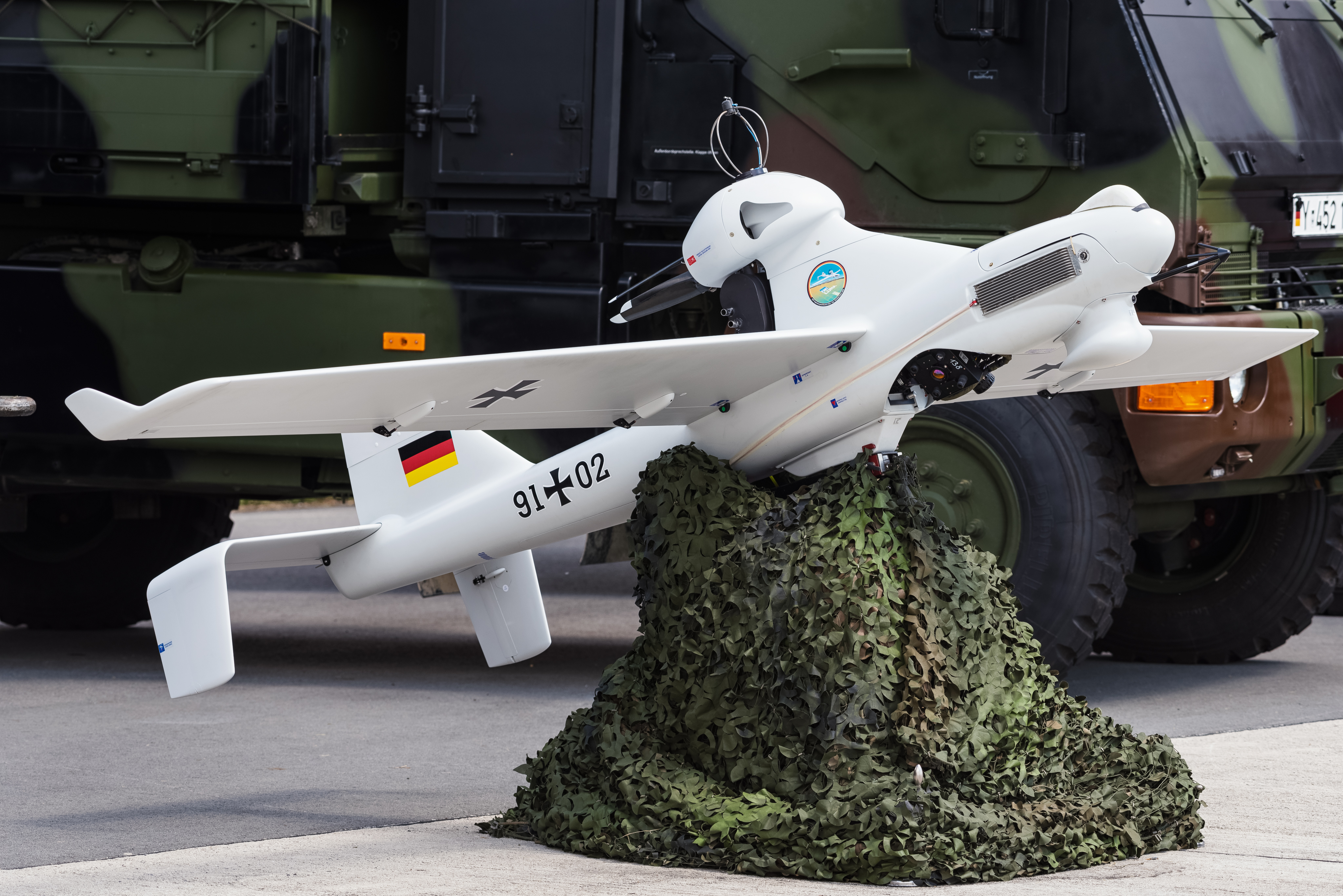
EMT Luna X-2000 used for reconnaissance and ESM missions of the German Army

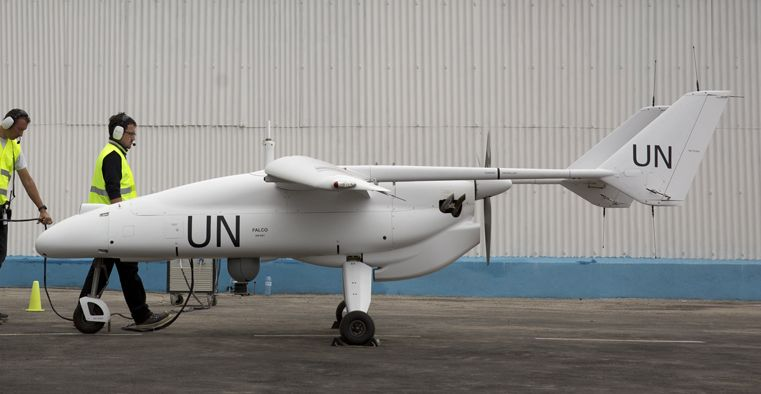
Italian Selex ES Falco used by several militaries for reconnaissance and surveillance

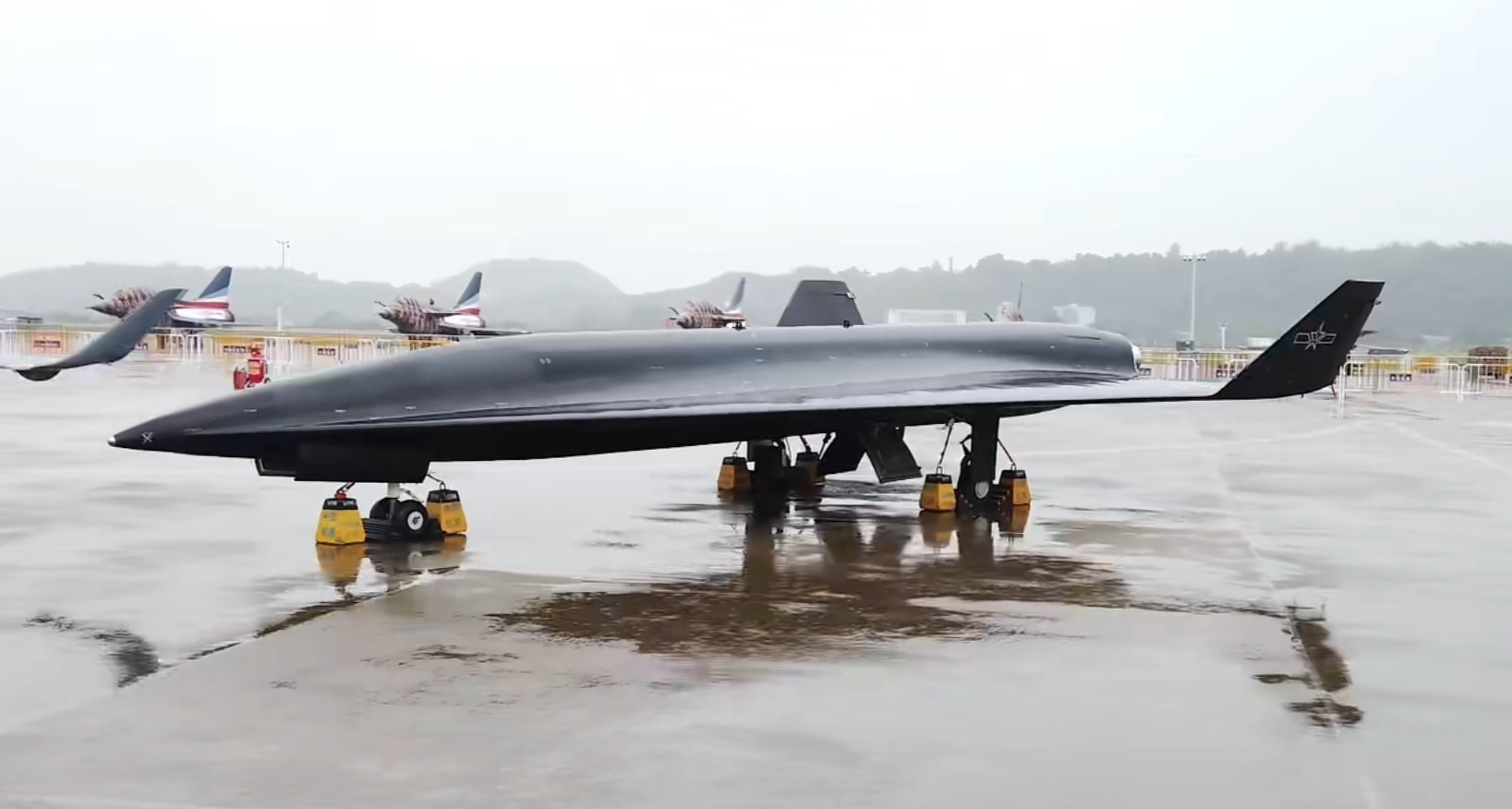
Chinese WZ-8 at the 2022 Zhuhai Airshow. WZ-8 is air launched Supersonic-Hypersonic HALE reconnaissance and surveillance drone.

An unmanned surveillance and reconnaissance aerial vehicle, is an unarmed military UAV that is used for intelligence, surveillance, target acquisition, and reconnaissance (ISTAR). Unlike unmanned combat aerial vehicle (UCAV), this type of system is not designed to carry aircraft ordnance such as missiles, ATGMs, or bombs for drone strikes. The main purpose is to provide battlefield intelligence. Small sized short-range man-portable unmanned aerial vehicles are called miniature UAV also used for battlefield intelligence.

== Current models ==
Name	Manufacturer(s)	Developing nation/region(s)
Boeing Insitu RQ-21 Blackjack	Insitu	US
Boeing Insitu ScanEagle	Insitu	US
Bramor C4EYE	C-Astral Aerospace	Slovenia
Elbit Hermes 450	Elbit Systems	Israel
Elbit Hermes 900	Elbit Systems	Israel
EMT Luna X-2000	EMT Penzberg	Germany
KAI RQ-101 Songgolmae	Korea Aerospace Industries	South Korea
Kronshtadt Orion	Kronstadt Group	Russia
Northrop Grumman MQ-4C Triton	Northrop Grumman	US
Northrop Grumman RQ-4 Global Hawk	Northrop Grumman	US
TAI Gözcü	Turkish Aerospace Industries	Turkey
Tekever ARX	Tekever	Portugal
Selex ES Falco	Leonardo	Italy
IAI Eitan	Israel Aerospace Industries	Israel
IAI Heron	Israel Aerospace Industries	Israel
Shahed 147	HESA	Iran
Hamaseh	HESA	Iran
Ababil	HESA	Iran
BZK-005^{A}	Harbin Aircraft Industry Group	China
WZ-7 Soaring Dragon	Guizhou Aircraft Industry Corporation	China
WZ-8	AVIC	China
WZ-10	Chengdu Aerospace	China
CASC Rainbow ^{B}	CASC	China
Saebyeol-4	Korean People's Army Air Force	North Korea

^AThe Harbin BZK-005 family encompasses reconnaissance variant like BZK-005 alongside combat-focused models like the BZK-005C.
^B CH-1and CH-2 variants are for reconnaissance.

== Future models and technology demonstrators ==
=== Belgium ===
The Belgians were early adopters of reconnaissance UAVs, introducing the "Epervier (Sparrowhawk)" UAV in the early 1970s. It was built by Manufacture Belge De Lampes Et De Materiel Electronique SA (MBLE) of Belgium. Epervier prototypes were propeller-driven, but the production Epervier UAV, the "X.5" model, was fitted with a Rover TJ125 turbojet with 510 N (52 kgf / 114 lbf) thrust. It was launched by a RATO booster and recovered by parachute.

It had a boxy fiberglass fuselage with a rear-mounted truncated-delta wing, a single tailfin, and winglet fins at the end of each wing. It had a length of 2.25 meters (7 feet 5 inches), a wingspan of 1.72 meters (5 feet 8 inches), and a launch weight of 142 kilograms (313 pounds), The Epervier has now been replaced by the IAI Hunter, which was obtained by the Belgian military with Belgian-specified systems.

=== Croatia ===
Croatia has fielded a series of tactical UAVs, beginning with the MAH-1 in early 1993 built by Igor Pongrac. Later on Israel's IAI Malat tactical UAVs were built and developed on behalf MAH-1.

=== France ===
Matra BAe Dynamics developed a UAV named "Dragon". The Dragon was roughly the same size as and similar to the SAGEM Crecerelle, with the same pusher-prop delta configuration, except that instead of having a single tailfin mounted on the fuselage, the Dragon had a tailfin on each wingtip. It was intended as a jamming platform. It seems to have dropped out of sight, possibly because the French Army acquired the Crecerelle for the jamming mission.

=== Georgia ===
Georgia's defense research center developed a series of small for infantry purpose unmanned areal vehicles, including multiple fixed-rotor variants. After a financial dispute with Israel over the delivery of UAV systems, the center in cooperation with TAM started to develop new medium-sized drones which would compensate the need of modern systems equipped with latest technology. Even though these projects are still in development stage, one variant was exposed in April, 2012.

=== Pakistan ===
Pakistan developed a number of reconnaissance UAVs. Pakistan's "Air Weapons Complex (AWC)" has completed development of their "Bravo" battlefield surveillance UAV, and is now in service with law enforcement and border security organizations. The Bravo is apparently a fairly conventional piston-powered small UAV, has a composite airframe, a maximum payload of 20 kilograms (44 pounds), and a radius of action of up to 80 kilometers (50 mi). It is guided by a preprogrammed navigation system. The AWC "Vision-1" is an improved version of the Bravo, and AWC also makes a high-altitude reconnaissance drone, the "Vector", as well as two target drones, the "Nishan" and the "Hornet".

=== Russia ===
Yakovlev is currently working on two new tactical UAVs:

- The "Albatross" is a tiltrotor design along the lines of the Bell Eagle Eye, except that it has an inverted-vee tail. It will have a 120 kW (160 hp) engine, seven-hour endurance. The range is limited to 100 kilometers (62 mi) by the command-data radio link. It is primarily focused on shipboard applications.
- Details of the "Expert" are unclear, but it appears to be a small battlefield surveillance UAV, of the sort usually launched by a bungee catapult.

=== Turkey ===
==== Bayraktar TB1 ====
Bayraktar TB1 (or Bayraktar Çaldıran) is the prototype UAV, made for the Tactical UAV program of the Undersecretariat for Defence Industries (Savunma Sanayii Mustesarligi or SSM; now the Presidency of Defense Industries) of Turkey, started in 2007. SSM invited two companies to compete for a prototype demonstration phase of the Tactical UAS Program. In 2009, Kale-Baykar, a joint venture between the Kale Group and Baykar Technologies, demonstrated Block A (named Bayraktar Çaldıran) with its dual redundant avionics system and fully autonomous takeoff and landing capability. The aircraft was selected as the winner of the program. While the contract was signed with the Presidency of Defense Industries for Bayraktar TB1s, these products were not delivered and remained as prototypes for Bayraktar Block 2s. Instead, serial production commenced with Baykar Bayraktar TB2.

=== Multinational ===
- EADS Orka: The European Aeronautic Defence and Space Company (EADS) company is currently promoting a number of UAVs. One, the "Orka", is a UAV helicopter with an airframe length of 6.2 meters (20 feet) and a weight of about 700 kilograms (1,500 pounds) for use by the army and on naval vessels. It is currently favored as the likely replacement for the larger and heavier SEAMOS helicopter UAV that was abandoned by the Germans. The Orka is derived from a light helicopter the Cabri built by Hélicoptères Guimbal of France. It has a conventional helicopter configuration, with a three-bladed main rotor with a diameter of 7.2 meters (24 feet), an enclosed "fenestron" tail rotor favored by the French, and landing skips. There is a sensor turret under the nose and an antenna or sensor drum under the belly between the landing skids. The production Orka is expected to have an endurance of 8 hours and a payload of 150 kilograms (330 pounds).
- EADS Scorpio: The EADS "Scorpio" is a much smaller reconnaissance helicopter UAV, focused on special operations. It is also of conventional helicopter configuration, with a two-blade main rotor with Hiller-type stabilization paddles, an exposed two-blade tail rotor, and landing skids. A sensor turret may be fitted between the landing skids. There are several variants in the Scorpio line. The 13 kilograms (29 pounds) "Scorpio-6" flies at 35 km/h (22 mph) and has an endurance of an hour. The 40 kilograms (88 pounds) "Scorpio-30" flies at 50 km/h (31 mph) and has an endurance of two hours.
