= Kronshtadt Group =

Russian military aerospace company

The Kronshtadt Group (also romanized as Kronstadt), is a Russian manufacturer of unmanned aerial vehicles and cruise missiles.

== History ==
Logo Kronshtadt Group

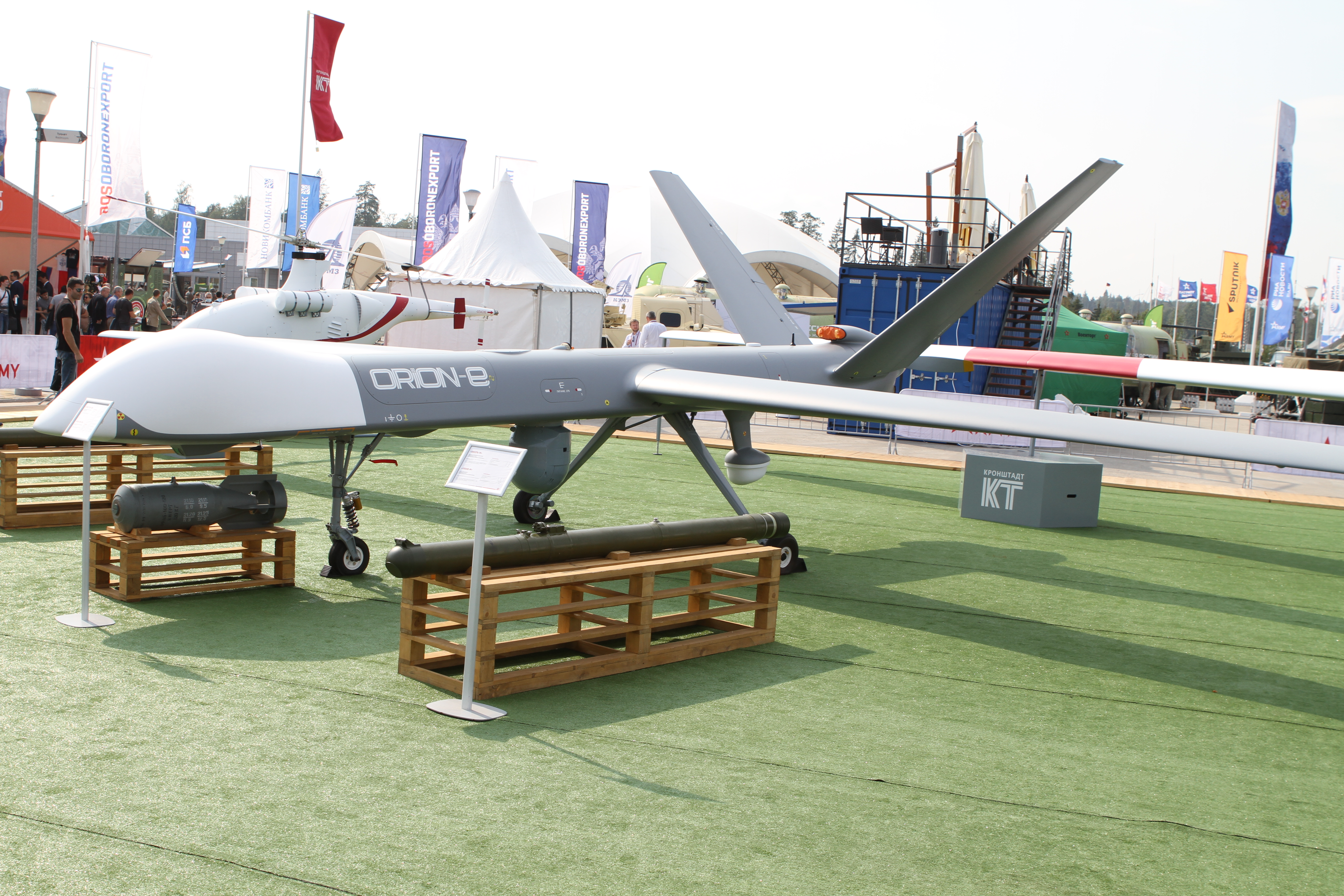
Orion-E displayed in 2021

Kronshtadt began the development of the Kronshtadt Orion in 2011 as part of the Russian MoD-funded Inokhodets programme. The Orion is similar in design and role to the American Predator/Gray Eagle and the Chinese Wing Loong. The Orion is targeted at both the domestic and export market.

A scale model of the Kronshtadt Sirius was presented for the first time in 2019 at the MAKS-2019 air show. It made its first flight by August 2023.

A full size mockup of the Grom UCAV was unveiled at Army-2020 by Kronshtadt.

The Kronshtadt Group was a major exhibitor at the 2021 Dubai Airshow. In 2022 the Group was sanctioned by the United Kingdom as part of a package of sanctions targeting participants in the war with Ukraine. Sistema pulled their investment in the group in 2023, which led to financial difficulties.

In May 2025 HUR revealed that Russia was using a new cruise missile produced by Kronshtadt called the S8000 Banderol, with the agency recovering electronic components from China, Japan, the US, and South Korea. The Banderol is air-launched with the Orion being the primary launch platform.

On the morning of May 28, 2025, their factory in the city of Dubna was the target of an attack by Ukrainian unmanned aerial vehicles. Eight hits were recorded on the roof of the factory.

== Products ==
- Kronshtadt Helios-RLD
- Kronshtadt Grom
- Kronshtadt Orion
- Kronshtadt Sirius
- S8000 Banderol
