= Urman, Nurimanovsky District, Republic of Bashkortostan =

Urman Урман
- Village
- Location within Bashkortostan Location within Russia
- Coordinates: 55°01′N 56°30′E
- Country: Russia
- Region: Bashkortostan
- District: Nurimanovsky District
- Time zone: UTC+5:00

Urman (Bashkir and Russian: Урман) is a rural locality (a village) in Baygildinsky Selsoviet, Nurimanovsky District, Bashkortostan, Russia. The population was 65 as of 2010. There is 1 street.

== Geography ==
Urman is located 24 km southwest of Krasnaya Gorka (the district's administrative centre) by road. Ukarlino is the nearest rural locality.
