= Sokol Altius =

Russian unmanned combat aerial vehicle

Altius-RU
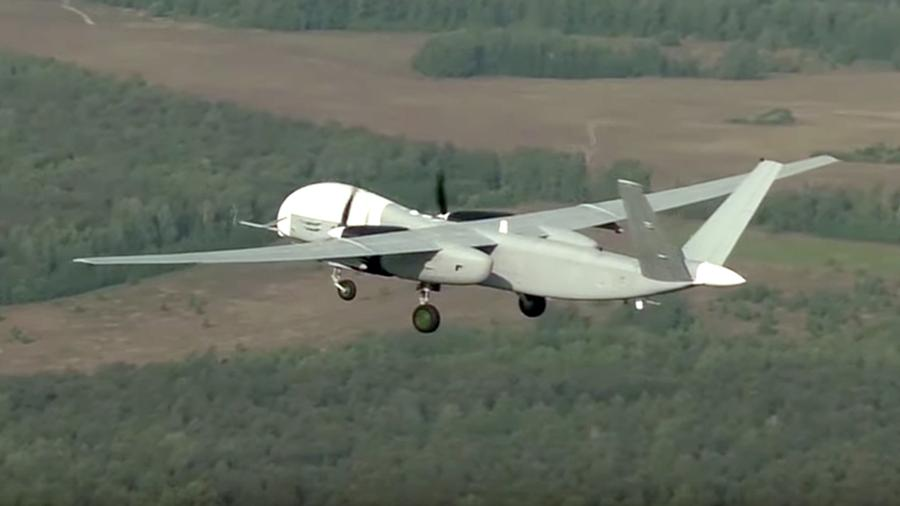
- Test flight of Altius-U

General information
- Type: Reconnaissance unmanned aerial vehicle Unmanned combat aerial vehicle Electronic warfare
- National origin: Russia
- Manufacturer: Ural Civil Aviation Plant
- Designer: OKB Sokol, Tranzas
- Status: In production
- Primary user: Russian Aerospace Forces
- Number built: 3

History
- Introduction date: 2021
- First flight: 2016

The Sokol Altius (also Altair) is a medium-altitude long-endurance Russian unmanned combat aerial vehicle developed by OKB Sokol (formerly known as Simonov Design Bureau) and Tranzas to perform reconnaissance, strike and electronic attack missions on behalf of the Russian Aerospace Forces and Navy. The program started in 2011 and thus far 3 prototypes have been built.

The Altius is comparable to the striking and reconnaissance capabilities of the US-made MQ-9 Reaper and RQ-4 Global Hawk UAVs.

== Development ==
The Altius program started in October 2011 after the Russian Ministry of Defence awarded a 3 billion Ruble contract with OKB Sokol (Kazan) and resulted in three demonstrators. The first one, called Altair, was unveiled in 2014 and flew for the first time in 2016, while the second demonstrator, the Altius-M, was spotted for the first time in 2017. At the end of 2018, the Ministry of Defence transferred project to the Ural Civil Aviation Plant (Yekaterinburg). The third demonstrator, the Altius-U, made its maiden flight in 2019. The fourth variant, the Altius-RU, is considered the final evolution of the project for serial production. The drone entered service in 2021.

The development of the Altius had known several technical delays because of practical setbacks and cost increases, such as losing the right to use French engines, forcing Russia to develop their own engines for the drone. Altius was originally planned to be fully operational by 2018. In April 2018, the authorities arrested the Director General of OKB Sokol, Simonov Alexander Gomzin, whom the investigation suspected of embezzlement of 900 million rubles allocated for the development of the Altius drone.

The Altius will be the backbone of the fleet of Russian heavy drones, the Izvestia daily reported in September 2019.

On 21 February 2021, it was reported that a state contract had been signed between the manufacturer and the Russian MoD for the supply of the first batch of Altius, with delivery expected in 2021.

On 8 July 2025 an Altius drone crashed into a residential house near Borisoglebskoye Airfield after experiencing a disruption in its navigation system.

== Design ==
Altius is built according to the classical aerodynamic design with a highly located wing of a large scope and a V-tail. It is known that Altius was built with the wide use of composite structural materials. Altius uses two new VK-800C turboprop engines developed at the Klimov Design Bureau.

== Variants ==
- Altair

First demonstrator.

- Altius-M

Second bigger demonstrator (3 built).

- Altius-U ("U"=Russian: "У", i.e. Ударный = Сombat)

Third and last demonstrator with a new satellite communication system, which significantly enlarged the flight range.

- Altius-RU ("RU"=Russian: "РУ", i.e. Разведывательно-Ударный = Reconnaissance and Сombat)

Fourth variant, showing the final design of the Altius drone when in serial production.

== Specifications Altius-U ==
Data from globalsecurity.org

General characteristics

- Crew: 0
- Empty weight: 6,000 kg (13,228 lb)
- Max takeoff weight: 8,000 kg (17,637 lb)
- Payload: 1,000 kg (2,200 lb)

Performance

- Range: 10,000 km (6,200 mi, 5,400 nmi)
- Endurance: 24 hours
- Service ceiling: 12,000 m (39,000 ft)

Armament

== See also ==
Related development

- Kronshtadt Orion
- Luch Korsar
- Sukhoi S-70 Okhotnik-B

Aircraft of comparable role, configuration, and era

- General Atomics MQ-9 Reaper
- Northrop Grumman RQ-4 Global Hawk
- AVIC Cloud Shadow
- European MALE RPAS
