= ENICS Eleron-3 =

Russian unmanned aerial vehicle (UAV), tactical drone

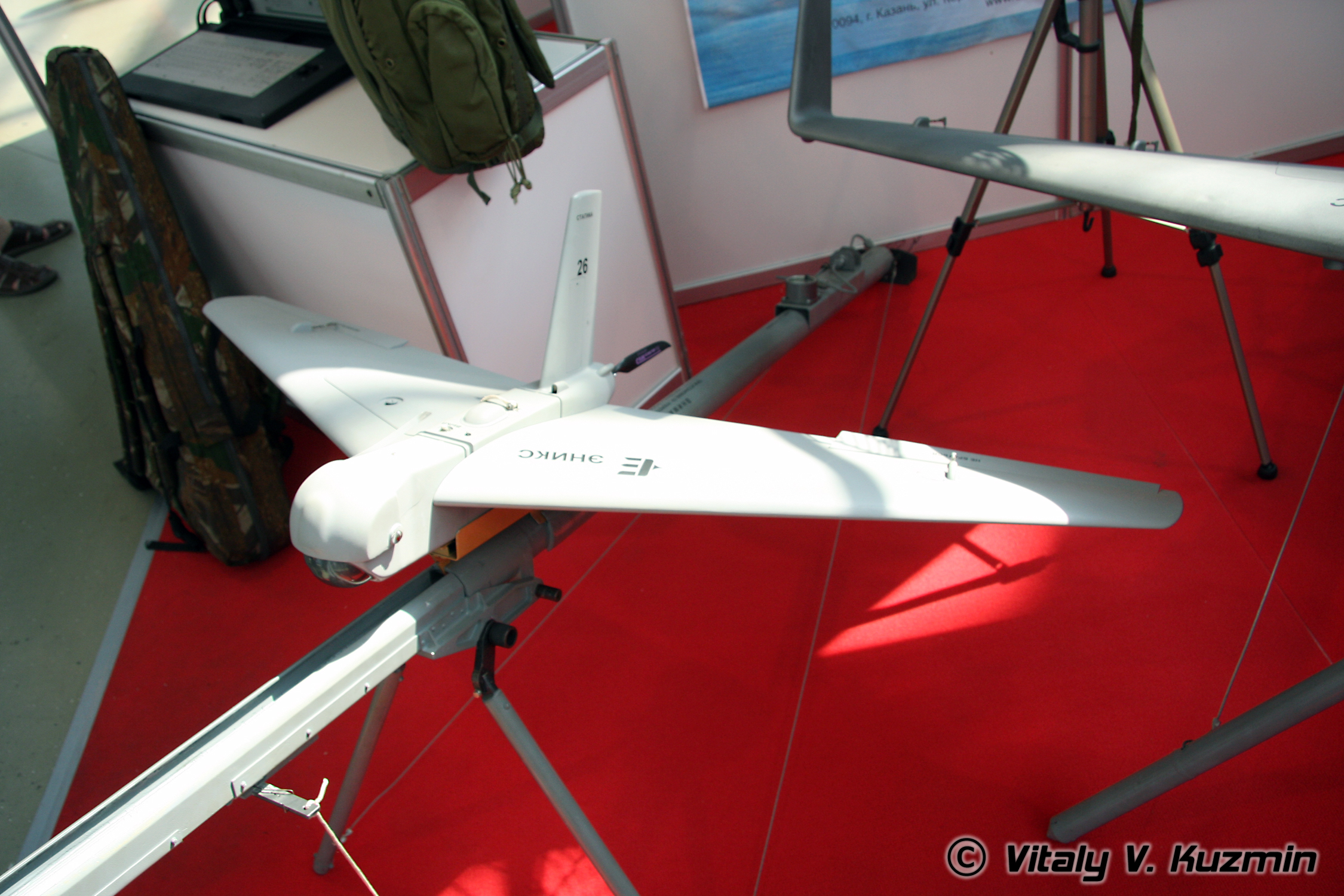
Eleron-3 at a military exhibition, 2008

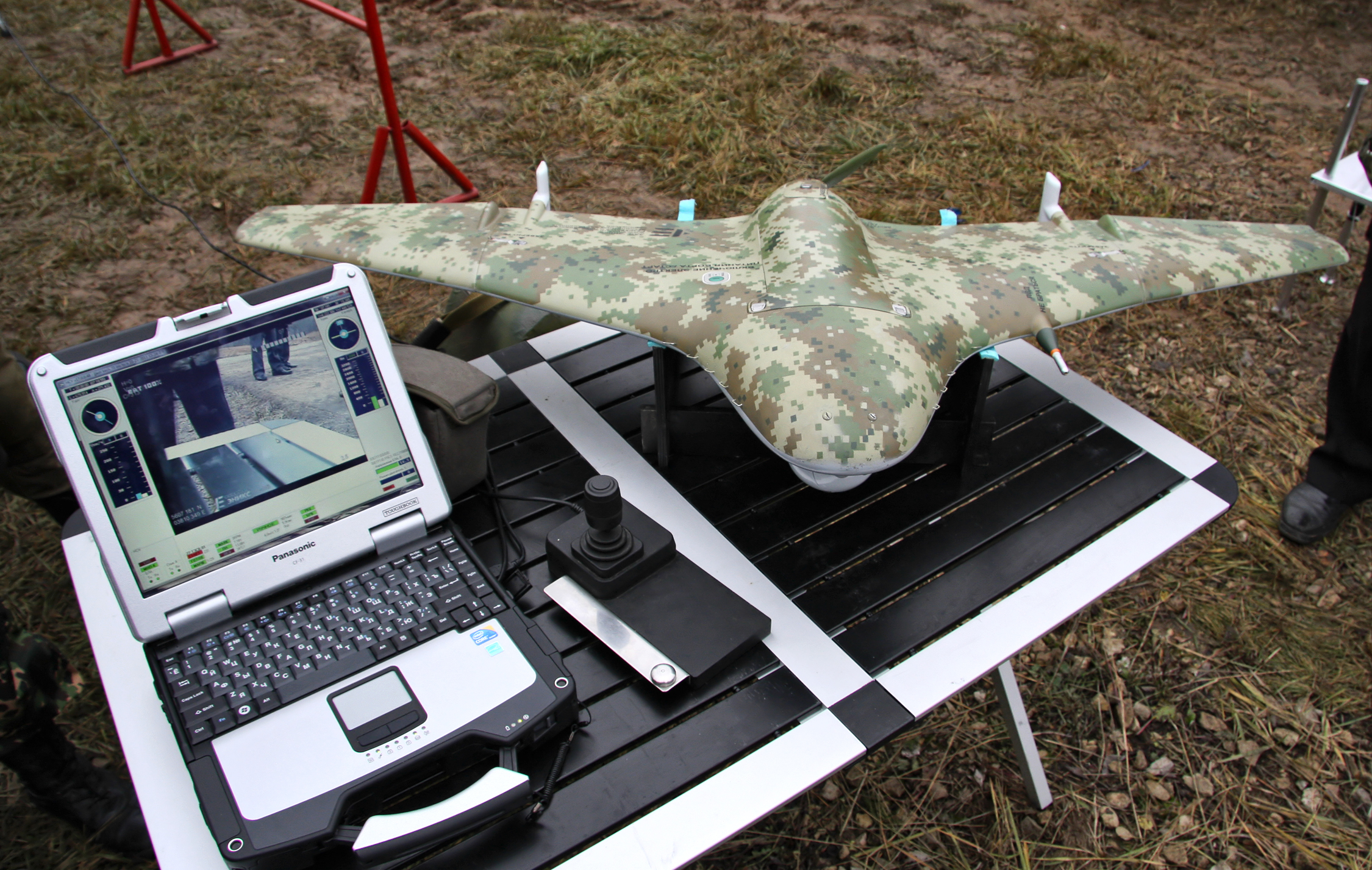
Eleron-3SW with control unit at the Interpolitex exhibition, 2011

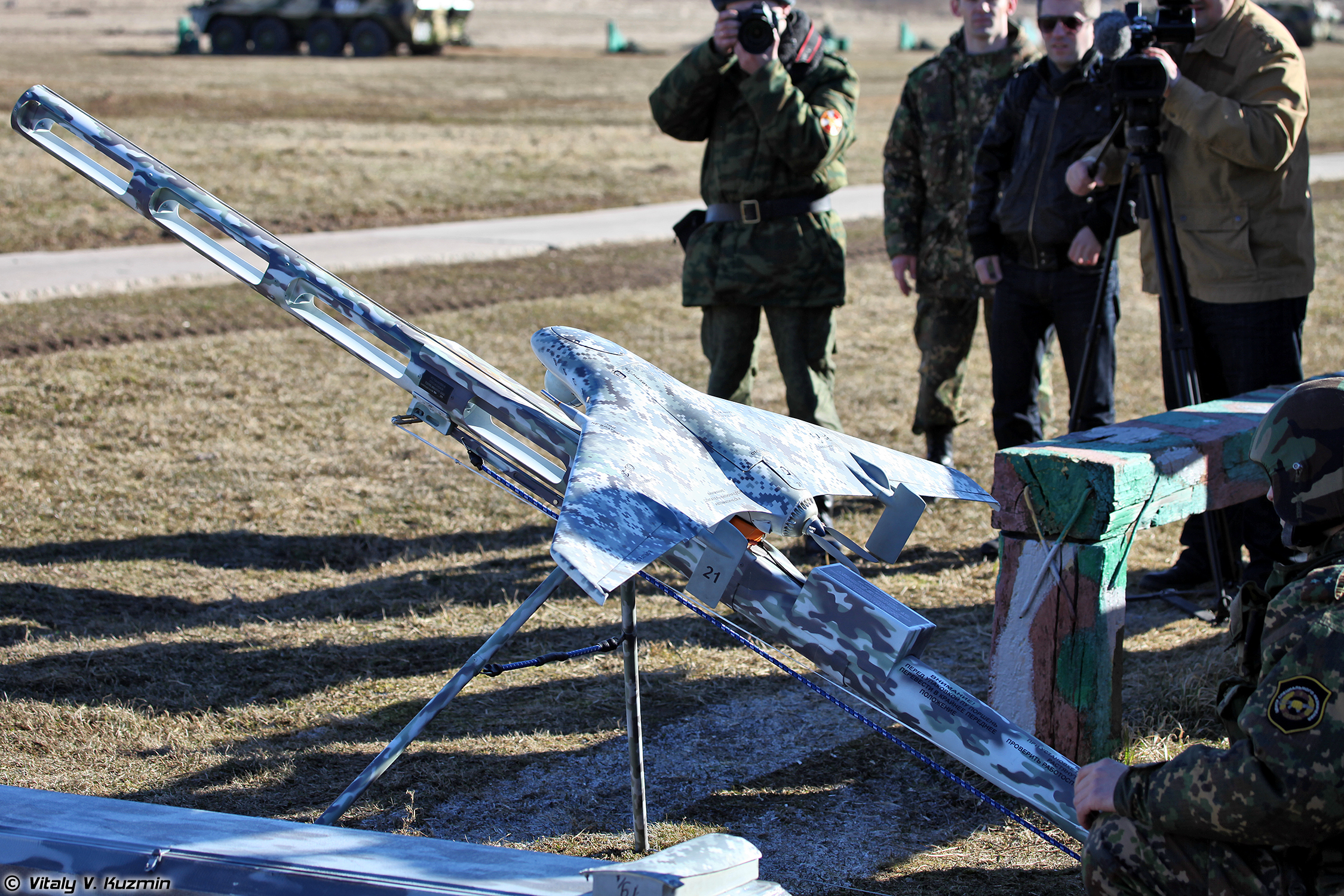
Eleron-3SW on launch catapult at a military exercise

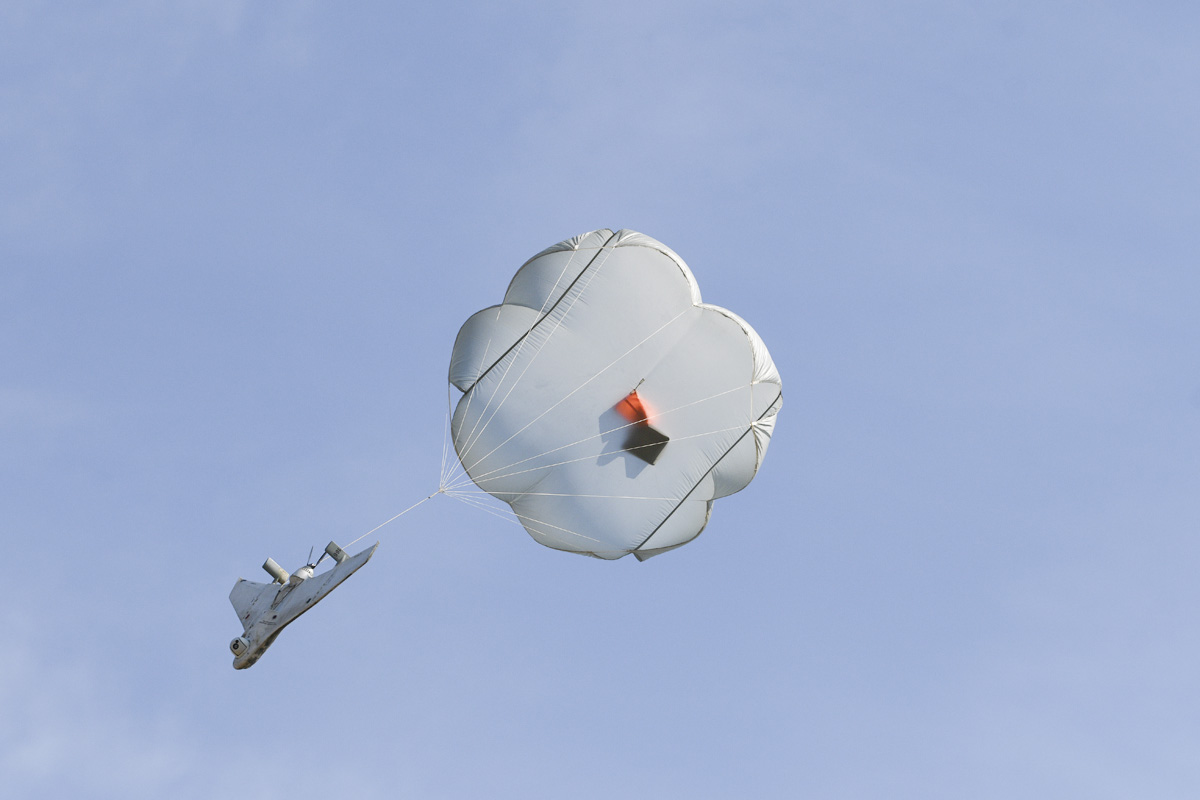
Eleron-3SW performing a parachute landing

The ENICS Eleron-3 (ЭНИКС Элерон-3 in Russian) is a reconnaissance UAV made by the Russian manufacturer ENICS.

== History ==
The Russian word eleron (Элерон) means aileron.

The Eleron-3 was originally aimed at the civilian sector, and can be used to survey things such as gas pipelines and power lines, or during search-and-rescue missions.

In 2012, the Russian armed forces decided to procure the Eleron-3 along with the larger Eleron-10, the procured Eleron-3SW model was an improvement over the original one. Initial production capacities were low; in the 12 months between 2013 and 2014, ENICS could only produce 34 Eleron-3SW; however, production capacities were eventually increased.

The Russian armed forces have used the Eleron-3 in the Russian-Ukrainian War in Donbas since 2014, and in military operations in the Syrian Civil War since 2015. In the early stages of the 2022 Russian invasion of Ukraine, Russian reconnaissance drones like the Eleron-3 were rarely used; but that changed later on. The Eleron-3 has been shot down during the invasion of Ukraine by electronic warfare devices such as the EDM4S.

== Characteristics ==
The Eleron-3 has a conventional aircraft fuselage, delta wings, and a tailplane. The Eleron-3SW, on the other hand, has a blended wing body without a tailplane. It is launched using an aircraft catapult and lands using a parachute. An electric motor drives a pusher propeller at the back. The Eleron-3SW model has been significantly improved over the original; in addition to better flight performance, it offers reduced noise and improved climb performance, reduced dimensions when folded for transport and a longer maximum flight duration.

The overall system consists of the drone, a modular payload (which can be a radio relay or radio jammer), a ground radio station and a launcher. The ground radio station can control up to two drones simultaneously.

The drone can be equipped with various image intensifier and thermal imaging cameras for night vision capabilities. The operator can search for targets in real time, with the exact position of these targets being displayed on the operator console using GLONASS or GPS.

The Eleron-3 offers three flight programs supported by GLONASS or GPS:

- Autonomous: The coordinates of the flight route are stored before departure. During the flight, the drone maintains radio silence and flies the route independently.
- Automatic: The coordinates of the flight route are stored before departure, but can be changed through the control panel during flight.
- Semi-automatic: The operator specifies the flight direction and altitude during the flight.

== Specifications ==
UAV Specifications
	Eleron-3	Eleron-3SW
Min speed (km/h)	70	70
Top speed (km/h)	120	130
Max flight time (mins)	90	100
Max range (km)	?	60
Service ceiling (m)	3500	4000
Wireless range (km)	20	25
Communication system	Analog	Digital
Maximum payload (kg)	0.6	1
Maximum takeoff weight (kg)	4.9	5.3
Wingspan (m)	?	1.47
Length (m)	?	0.6
Operating temperature (°С)	-30 to 40	-30 to 40
