= S8000 Banderol =

- Type: Cruise missile
- Place of origin: Russia

Service history
- In service: 2025–present
- Used by: Russian Armed Forces
- Wars: Russo-Ukrainian War

Production history
- Manufacturer: Kronshtadt Group

Specifications
- Warhead weight: 150kg
- Engine: SW800Pro; 800N (at STP)
- Operational range: 500 kilometers (311 mi)
- Maximum speed: Mach 0.57 (700 km/h; 434.96 mph; 194.44 m/s)
- Guidance system: Inertial, satellite
- Launch platform: Kronshtadt Orion

The S8000 Banderol (Russian: S8000 Бандероль) is a Russian air-launched, jet-powered medium-size cruise missile, with a range up to 500 km and a warhead up to 150 kg, developed in 2025 by the Kronshtadt Group. The Air Force of Ukraine described it as a "hybrid of a drone, an aerial bomb, and a missile."

== Name ==
Banderol means "package, or small parcel."

== History ==
In May 2025, the Military intelligence service of Ukraine (HUR) revealed that Russia was using a new cruise missile called S8000 Banderol.

According to HUR, the Banderol is more agile than other Russian cruise missiles, suggesting that it may be intended to use flight profiles that are better able to evade Ukrainian air defense systems.

The widespread usage of the Banderol has forced Ukrainian fighter jets, such as the MiG-29, to engage them with obsolete missiles such as the R-60. The Brave1 platform has established a new "interceptor that destroys 'Banderols' at a fraction of the cost of the missile-drones themselves", with four intercepts. Swedish Bofors L70 has also been used. The Banderol costs $100,000 per missile.

As of late summer 2026, Russia has started the production of the Banderol's successor. The Dan-T missile has similar specifications with Banderol but it can be launched from aircraft, helicopters, wheeled ground and naval platforms, it is 35% cheaper, it is difficult to intercept, and it has an entirely domestic component base. It was reported by Russian sources that the munition had already passed "hundreds" of successful combat launches in Ukraine as of September 2026.

On 2 October 2026, an Ukrainian Mirage 2000-5F shot down a Russian S8000 Banderol cruise missile with its onboard 30 mm DEFA 554, in a first kill of its kind.

== Description ==
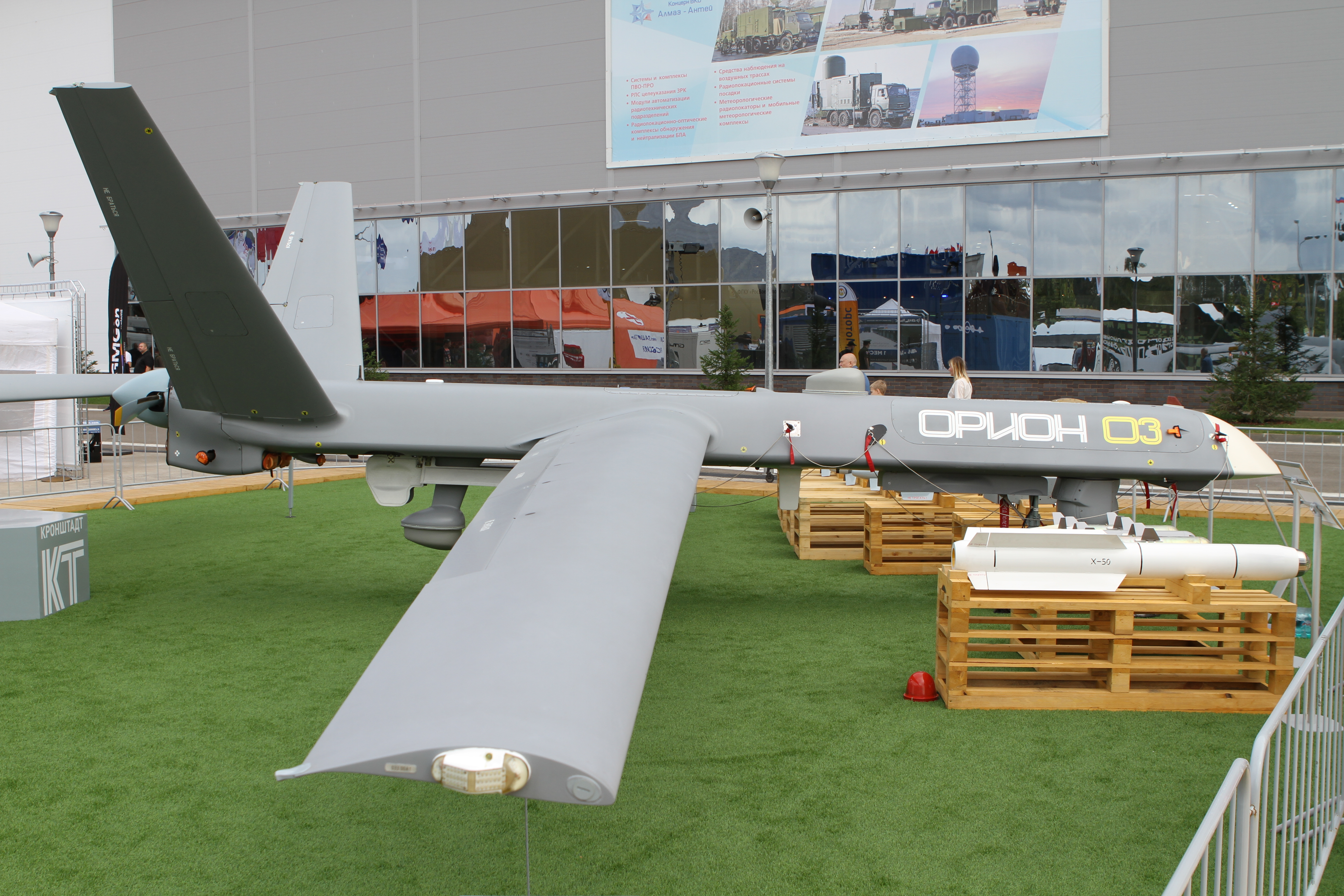
Banderol launch vehicle Kronshtadt Orion drone in 2020 (before Banderol was developed)

The Banderol's design focuses on low cost and ease of manufacturing. According to Ukrainian claims, many of the components, including key ones, are imported to Russia from abroad.

The Banderol is air-launched, with the Kronshtadt Orion drone being the primary launch platform. It can also be integrated with the Mi-28 Havoc helicopter.

== See also ==
- Garpiya
- Multi-mission Affordable Capacity Effector
- Small Diameter Bomb
