= Luch Korsar =

Russian unmanned aerial vehicle

Korsar
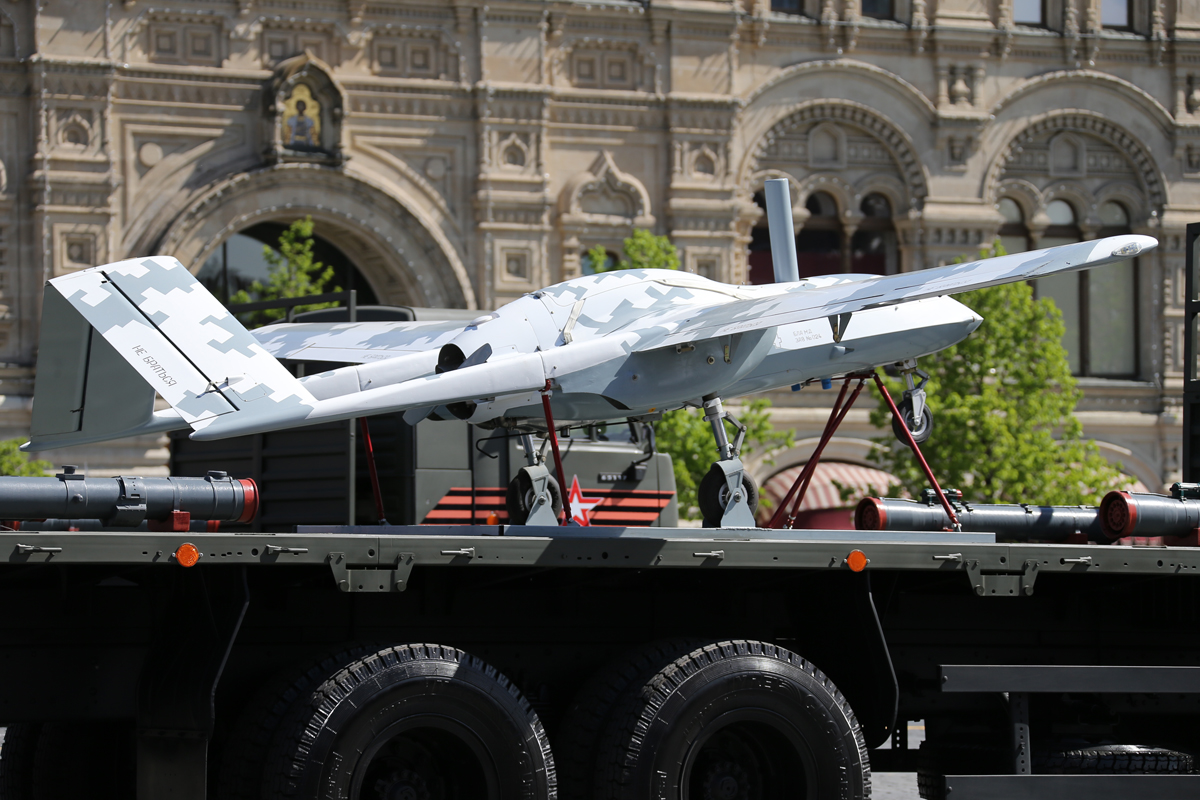
- Korsar on display at Red Square during the 2018 Moscow Victory Day Parade

General information
- Type: Reconnaissance Unmanned aerial vehicle Unmanned combat aerial vehicle Electronic warfare
- National origin: Russia
- Manufacturer: OKB Luch
- Designer: OKB Luch, Ruselectronics
- Status: In limited service
- Primary user: Russian Ground Forces

History
- Introduction date: 2018
- First flight: 2015

The Luch Korsar (Russian: Корсар, English: 'Corsair') is a medium-weight Russian unmanned aerial vehicle developed by OKB Luch, member of Ruselectronics owned by Rostec, to perform reconnaissance, strike and electronic attack missions on behalf of the Russian Ground Forces and Navy. The program started in 2009 and the flight testing commenced in 2015. It is considered as an improved analogue of the US-made RQ-7 Shadow UAV.

== Development ==
OKB Luch began working on the Korsar project in 2009 and commenced flight testing in 2015. It was unveiled for the first time at the 2018 Moscow Victory Day Parade on May 9.

At first, the Korsar was considered to be a medium-weight UAV for tactical applications with no mention of its ability to perform kinetic strikes. According to Rostec in May 2018, Korsar serial production is being set up. In the future, this system may come with improved air vehicles whose operational range would be increased from 120 to 160 km (65 to 86 nautical miles) currently to 250 km (135 nmi). They will carry mission equipment with enhanced functionality in air reconnaissance and electronic warfare and reconnaissance.

In May 2020, Rostec said the Korsar would be upgraded to increase its radius of operation and outfit it with electronic warfare systems. As of December 2020, Korsar was undergoing test flights and operational evaluation.

According to Russian Deputy Minister Gen. Yuri Borisov, responsible for weapons procurement, the Russian Minister of Defence will be procuring a large quantities of Korsar.

== Design ==
The Korsar features a twin-boom design with V-tail empennage and a single 50-to-70 hp piston engine driving a twin-blade pushing propeller, similar in design to the US RQ-7 Shadow and the Turkish Bayraktar TB2.

== Operational history ==
Russian sources argue that the Korsar has already been tested in Syria, targeting rebels, various types of armored vehicles and infrastructural objects. It is said that its excellent performance has "persuaded the military to integrate it in the Russian armed forces".

One was reported lost in Ukraine on 9 November 2022 according to photos from social media. TASS reported in March 2023 that Corsar is being used in the "SMO" in Ukraine. This is evidenced by footage demonstrated at a meeting of the board of the Russian Ministry of Defense.

== Variants ==
Korsar
Serial variant.
Korsar-M
Seaborne variant for the Russian Navy.

== Specifications ==
Data from

General characteristics

- Crew: None
- Length: 4.2 m (13 ft 9 in)
- Wingspan: 6.5 m (21 ft 4 in)
- Empty weight: 200 kg (441 lb)
- Max takeoff weight: 400 kg (882 lb)
- Payload:

Performance

- Maximum speed: 150 km/h (93 mph, 81 kn)
- Range: 250 km (160 mi, 130 nmi)
- Endurance: 12 hours
- Service ceiling: 2,000 m (6,600 ft)

Armament

== See also ==
Related development

- Kronshtadt Orion
- Sokol Altius

Aircraft of comparable role, configuration, and era

- RQ-7 Shadow
- Bayraktar TB2
