= Kronshtadt Orion =

Russian unmanned combat aerial vehicle

Orion Орион
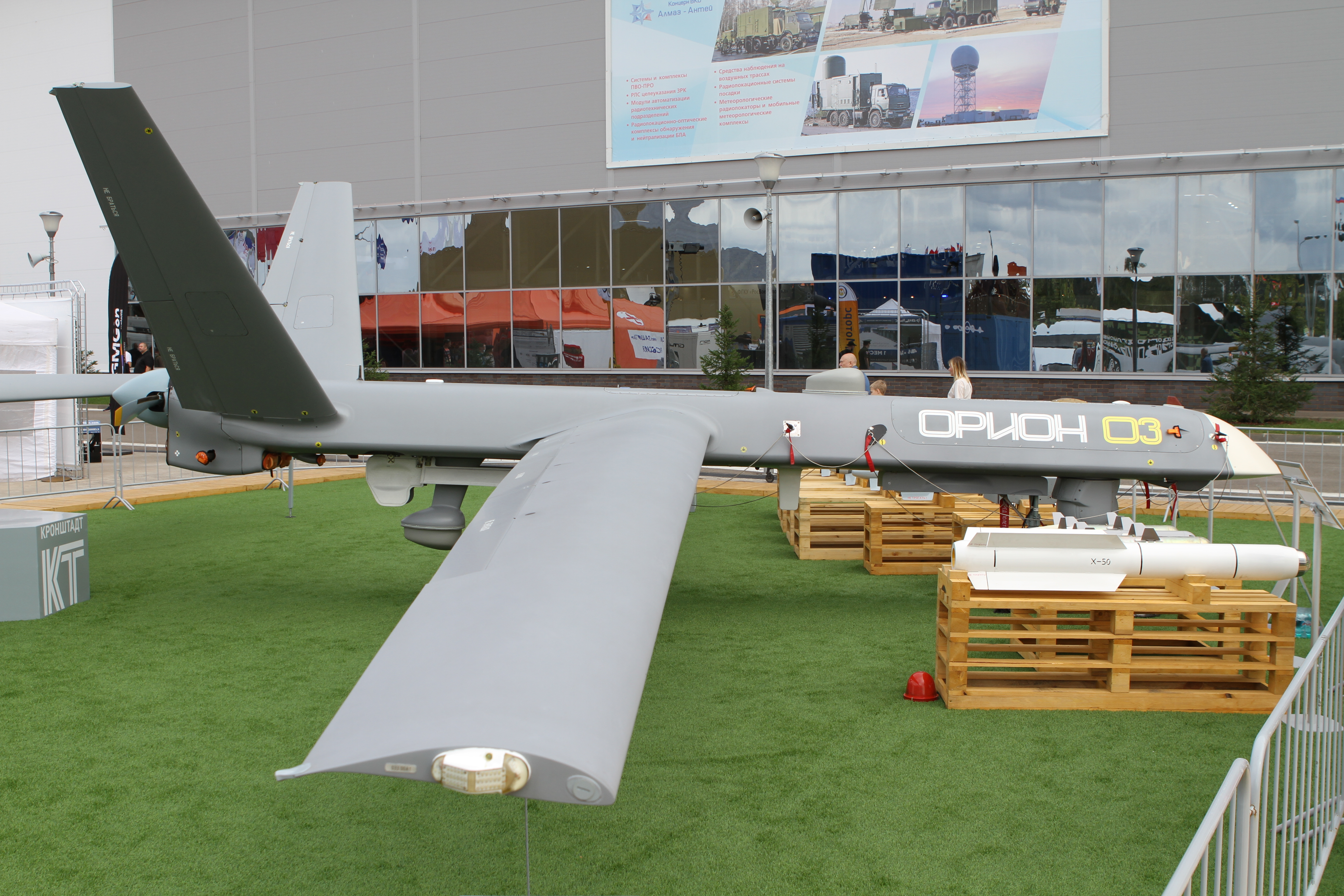
- Orion UAV

General information
- Type: Unmanned surveillance and reconnaissance aerial vehicle (reconnaissance variant) and unmanned combat aerial vehicle (armed variant)
- National origin: Russia
- Manufacturer: Kronstadt Group
- Status: In service
- Primary user: Russian Ground Forces
- Number built: 48+

History
- First flight: 2016

The Kronshtadt Orion is a family of Russian unmanned aerial vehicles (UAV) developed by Kronstadt Group. There are several variants, catering for both Russia's domestic and export markets.

== Development ==
Kronstadt began the development of Orion in 2011 as part of the Russian Ministry of Defense (MoD)-funded Inokhodets programme. In 2013–2015, the company revealed the first layout of the Orion. In May 2016, RIA Novosti reported that test flights had begun.

On 24 August 2021, it was reported that the Russian MoD and Kronshtadt signed a deal for the procurement of five combat groups of an upgraded version of Orion, Inokhodets-RU (also known as Sirius). Each group will have several drones; delivery was scheduled for 2023.

The large-scale Russian–Belarusian exercise Zapad in September 2021 included Orion drones.

== Operational history ==
According to Russian Defense Minister Sergei Shoigu, the Orion was tested for strike missions in 2019 in Syria. In 2020, the Russian Defence Ministry received the first batch of Orion drones for trial operation.

By 9 April during the 2022 Russian invasion of Ukraine, there was video confirmation of Orion performing six successful strikes on Ukrainian vehicles. The first combat loss of an Orion was reported on 7 April. By 2 December 2025, nine Orions had reportedly been lost in combat according to open source intelligence website Oryx.

Russian journalist Aleksandr Rogatkin in April 2024 commented on the relative lack of use of Orion drones by Russian military. He said that the Orions were "eclipsed by the Lancets and primitive FPV drones, which thrashed such a heap of enemy equipment that several tanks and trucks destroyed by the Orion in Mariupol did not make a difference." He also said that "this war is not for medium-altitude UAVs" and with layered air defense, they are useless as combat drones.

In September 2024, during the Ukrainian Kursk incursion, the lower presence of anti-aircraft capabilities in the operational area allowed Russian forces to use Orion drones in attack and reconnaissance missions against Ukrainian formations. As of 23 October 2024, there are at least 26 instances of Orion striking Ukrainian positions or armored vehicles in Kursk and Sumy Oblasts according to the Russian OSINT project LostArmour. On 20 October, Ukrainian forces published a video of an Orion drone being shot down, reportedly by a Strela-10 SAM system. The Ukrainian Air Force also claimed to have destroyed one on 31 August.

According to Russian sources, the first contract for the export of the Orion-E reconnaissance and strike system had been signed with an Asian country as of late December 2024.

One system was delivered to Ethiopia in early January 2026. Several export contracts have reportedly been signed and are being executed.

== Variants ==
Orion (Inokhodets)
Original version, also known as Russian: иноходец, romanized: Inokhodets, lit. 'pacer'. Can carry four guided bombs or four missiles and has a maximum payload of 200 kg.

Orion-E
Export version of the Orion. Export contracts for the reconnaissance version of the drone have been signed.

Helios-RLD

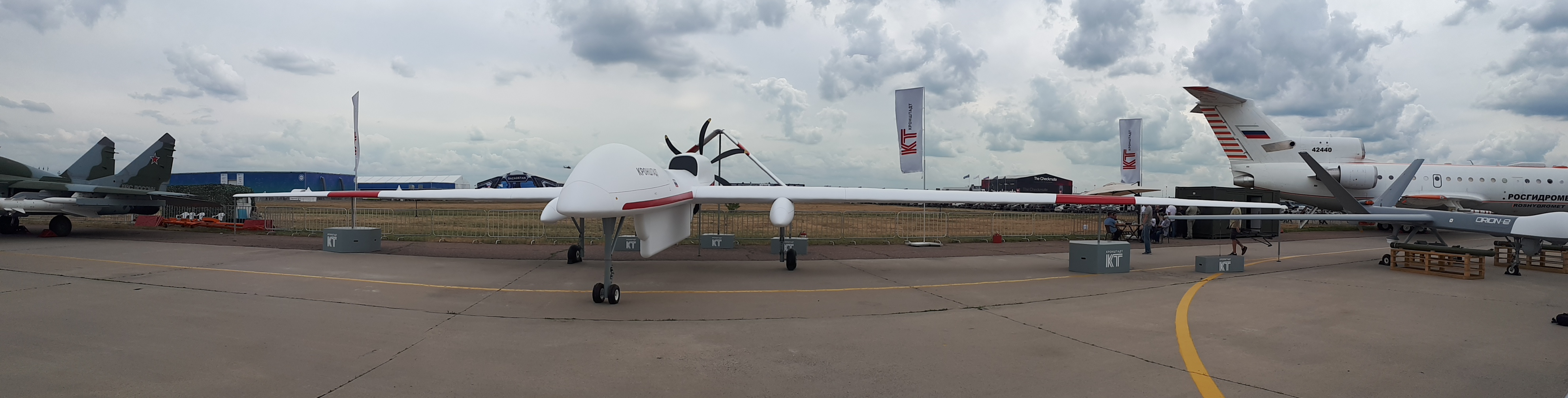
Orion-2 Helios (export version) at MAKS-2021 airshow, Moscow.

Helios-RLD is a larger version of the original Orion, with a bigger payload, classified as a high-altitude long-endurance (HALE) UAV, It weighs 5 tonnes (11,000 pounds) with a wingspan of 30 meters (98.42 feet). It is intended for autonomous operations of up to 30 hours, at altitudes above 10,000 meters. A full-scale mock-up was unveiled on August 27, 2020, at the Kronshtadt pilot plant. The first flight is planned for 2024.

Inokhodets-RU (Sirius)

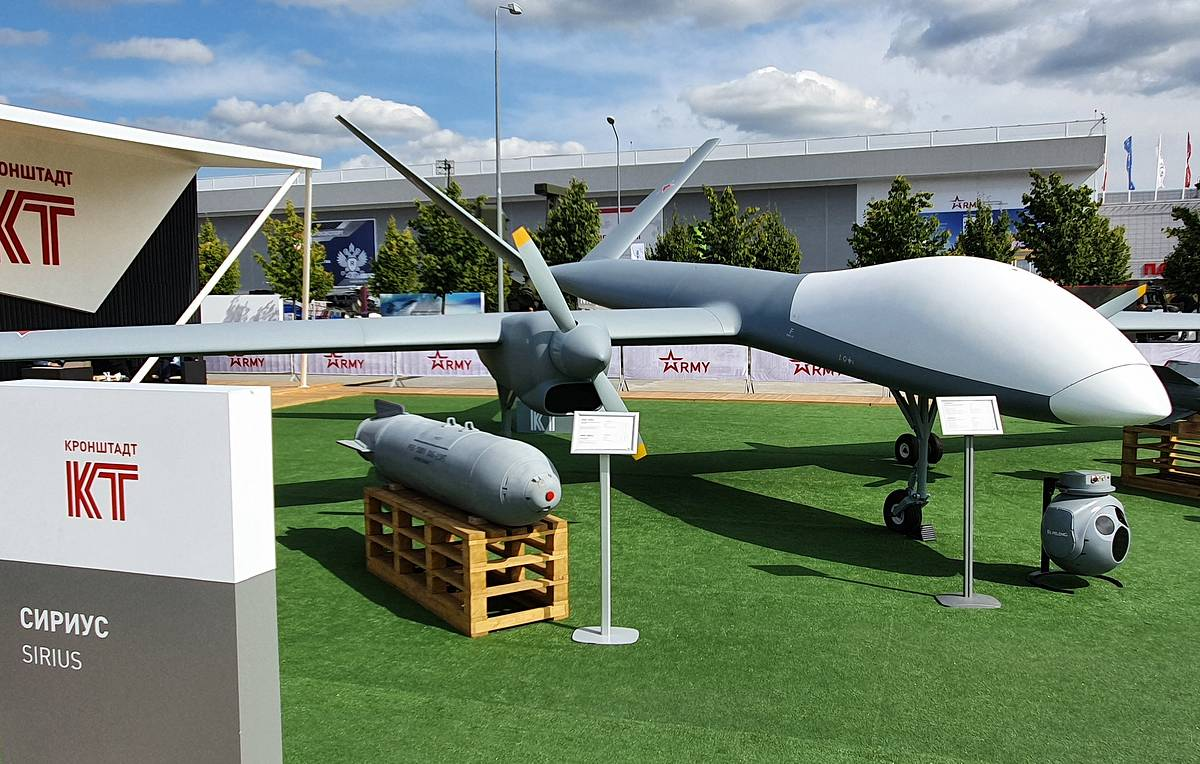

Also known as Sirius, the Inokhodets-RU is an upgraded variant of the Orion with a bigger and different design, the key difference being twin engines. Sirius is a medium-altitude long-endurance (MALE) attack UAV, with a wingspan of 30m, length of 9m and height of 3.3m, a maximum combat load of 450kg, cruise speed of 295km/h, maximum altitude 12,000m, and an endurance of 40 hours. A full-size mock-up of the 5 tonne drone was presented at the MAKS-2019 International Aviation and Space Exposition held at Zhukovsky International Airport near Moscow, Russia. Inokhodets-RU has been tested jointly with piloted aircraft as of August 2022. First flight occurred in 2023.

== Foreign operators ==
Algeria

- The Algerian Ministry of National Defence has formally confirmed the acquisition and operational deployment of the Kronshtadt Orion during the live-fire exercises 'Ouragan' conducted on April 8, 2026.

Ethiopia

- Ethiopian Air Force

== Specifications (Orion-E) ==
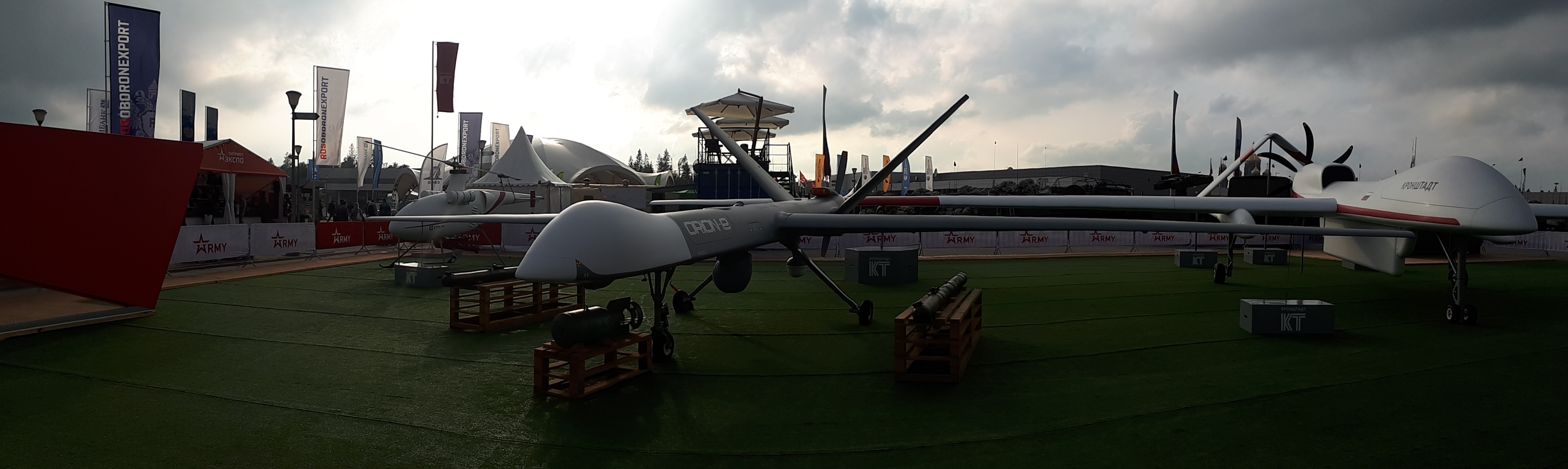
Orion on the left, export version of "Orion-2" on the right

Data from Kronstadt Company

General characteristics

- Length: 8 m (26 ft 3 in)
- Wingspan: 16 m (52 ft 6 in)
- Height: 3 m (9 ft 10 in)
- Max takeoff weight: 1,150 kg (2,535 lb)
- Payload: 250 kg (550 lb)

Performance

- Maximum speed: 200 km/h (120 mph, 110 kn)
- Cruise speed: 120 km/h (75 mph, 65 kn)
- Range: 1,440 km (890 mi, 780 nmi)
- Endurance: 24 hours with 60 kg payload
- Service ceiling: 7,500 m (24,600 ft)

Armament

- Missiles: Vikhr-1V laser-guided antitank missile, S8000 Banderol cruise missile

== See also ==
- Sokol Altius
- Luch Korsar
- Sukhoi S-70 Okhotnik-B
