= TAI Aksungur =

Turkish unmanned combat aerial vehicle

Aksungur
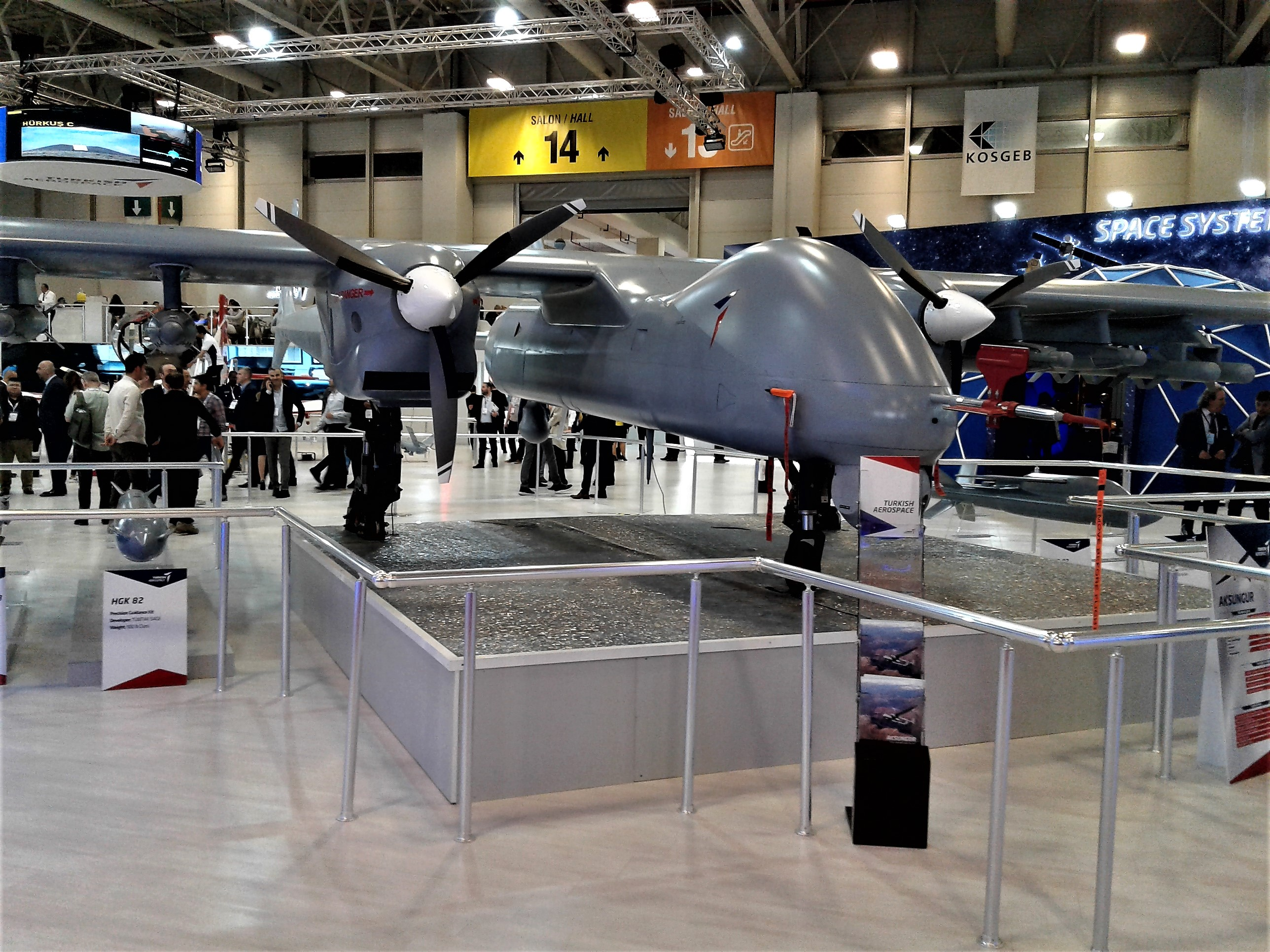
- TAI Aksungur at the 2019 International Defence Industry Fair in Istanbul, Turkey.

General information
- Type: Unmanned combat aerial vehicle
- National origin: Turkey
- Manufacturer: Turkish Aerospace Industries (TAI)
- Status: In service
- Primary user: Turkish Armed Forces
- Number built: 12 (as of March 2023)

History
- Manufactured: 2019-present
- Introduction date: 20 October 2021
- First flight: 20 March 2019

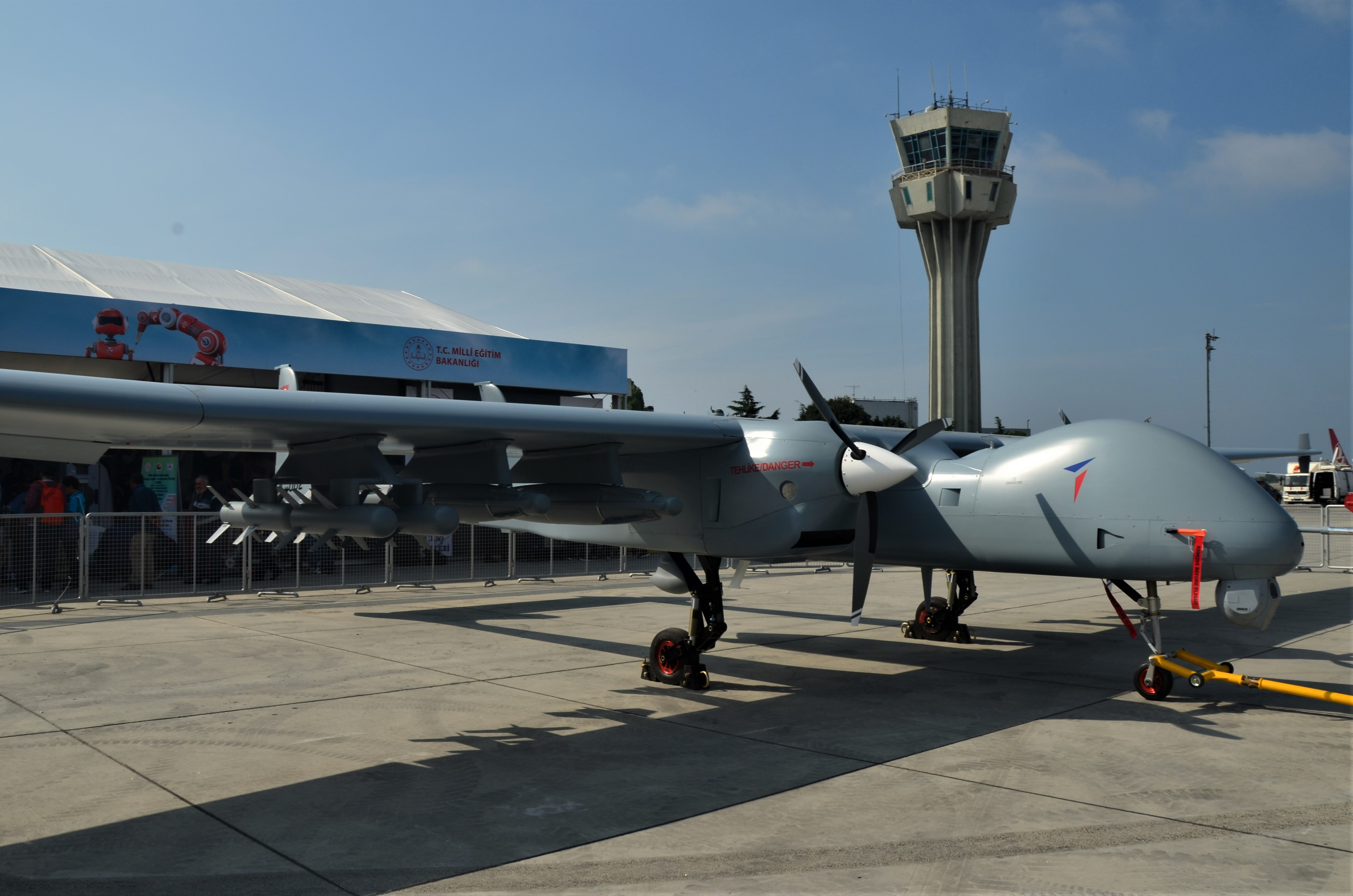
TAI Aksungur

The TAI Aksungur (previously known as Anka-2) is an unmanned combat aerial vehicle (UCAV) built by Turkish Aerospace Industries (TAI) for the Turkish Armed Forces. Using existing technology from the TAI Anka series of drones, it is the manufacturer's largest drone with payload capacity for mission-specific equipment. It is intended to be used for long-term intelligence, surveillance, target acquisition, and reconnaissance (ISTAR), electronic warfare (EW), signals intelligence (SIGINT), maritime patrol and drone strike missions. TAI planned to integrate weapon packages and put the Aksungur into production in early 2020. The first unit was delivered to the Turkish Naval Forces on 20 October 2021. The aircraft used common avionics architecture and ground segment with TAI Anka and TAI Anka-3. The aircraft is capable of conducting autonomous operations including automatic take-off and landing.

== Development ==
Aksungur, Turkish for gyrfalcon, is classified as a medium-altitude long-endurance (MALE) unmanned aerial vehicle (UAV). It is designed and manufactured by Turkish Aerospace Industries (TAI) for tactical surveillance and reconnaissance missions of the Turkish Armed Forces. The Aksungur has twin turbocharged engines with a twin boom configuration.

Developing the UAV took 18 months. The airframe, wing and landing gear are new designs, while control systems are from the existing TAI Anka family of drones. A new turbodiesel engine is also in development for the programme, with initial flight tests of the airframe using an existing engine. Two prototypes were manufactured for testing purposes. Its maiden flight, displaying automatic takeoff and landing capabilities, took place on 20 March 2019, and lasted four hours and twenty minutes. Reportedly, a second test flight of three hours was performed on 3 April the same year. It was introduced at the 2019 International Defence Industry Fair (IDEF) in Istanbul, Turkey, on 30 April. CNN Türk reported ongoing flight tests in July 2019, with the manufacturer anticipating a total of 50 to 60 tests by the end of the year. The UAV is planned to go into series production by the first quarter of 2020.

== Design ==
The aircraft is 12 m (39 ft) long and 3 m (9.8 ft) high when resting on its landing gear. The high-mounted wings have a slight dihedral angle and a wingspan of 24 m (79 ft). The wings end with small winglets. The centralized fuselage is under the wings and houses avionics, camera and sensors systems, with a chin-mounted camera blister. Fuel is stored in the fuselage and wings. A turbocharged engine is mounted under each wing, with the engine nacelles each extending backward into a tail boom. These tail booms terminate in vertical stabilizers, with a horizontal tailplane joining them. The tricycle landing gear retracts into the engine nacelles and the nose of the aircraft while in flight.

The aircraft is powered by two forward-mounted TEI-PD170 dual-turbocharged diesel engines developed by Tusaş Engine Industries (TEI), equipped with three-bladed propellers in a tractor (puller) configuration. According to the manufacturer, these enable the Aksungur to cruise at a maximum speed of 180 km/h (110 mph) and carry a maximum payload of 750 kg (1,650 lb) to an altitude of 25,000 ft (7,600 m), or ascend to 35,000 ft (11,000 m) with a 150 kg (330 lb) payload. The aircraft's designed maximum payload is 375% greater than that of its predecessor; its maximum takeoff weight is 3,300 kg (7,300 lb). It is rated to stay aloft 12 hours as an attack aircraft or maritime patrol aircraft and 24 hours during signals intelligence missions.

Remote control of the UAV is performed by DO-178B compatible software on DO-254 compatible ground control station and hardware using double backed-up encrypted digital data link. Optional beyond-visual-range operation flexibility is available via communications satellite.

TAI expects to integrate weapon systems typical of F-4 and F-16 fighter aircraft onto Aksungur in the last quarter of 2019. Three hardpoints are situated under each wing for attaching external payloads, such as munitions or sonar buoys. These hardpoints are rated for loads of 150, 300 and 500 kg (330, 660 and 1,100 lb). Proposed armaments include TEBER-81 (laser-guided bomb Mk-81), TEBER-82 (laser-guided bomb Mk-82), LUMTAS, MAM-L, Roketsan Cirit, MAM-C, HGK-3 (precision-guided munition), KGK (82) (winged guided kit), and miniature bomb.

== Operational history ==
In October 2022, Turkey deployed Aksungur drones in the Aegean Sea to place Sonobuoy in order to find Greek submarines.

In November 2023, a Turkish Navy Aksungur, serial TCB883, crashed in North Iraq.

In May 2024, a Turkish Army Aksungur was shot down by PKK at Qandil Mountains region of Iraq during an anti-terror operation of the Army.

In August 2024, another Aksungur drone was shot down by Iraqi Army Pantsir Air Defence system in Kirkuk.

== Operators ==
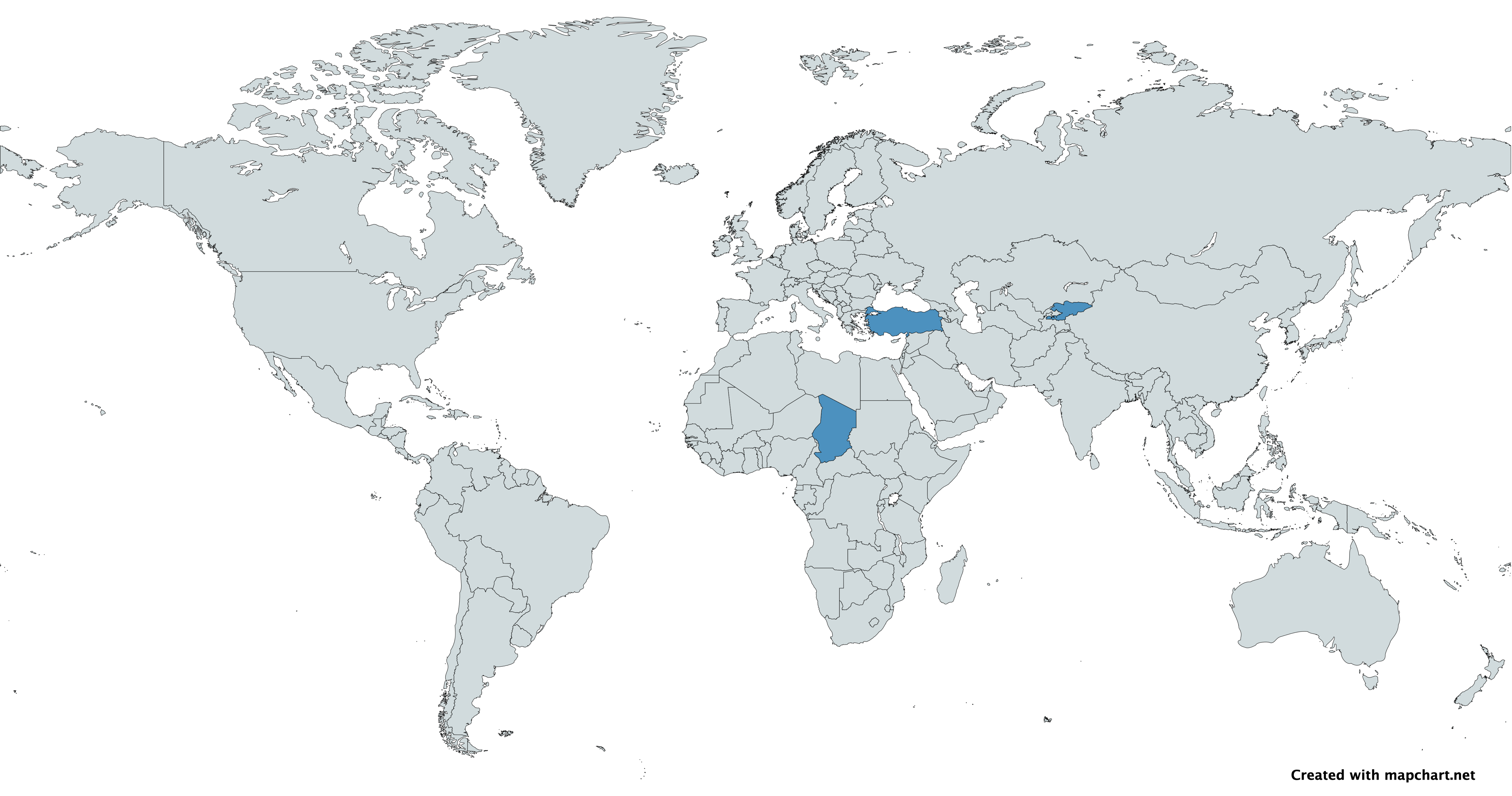
Map with operators of the TAI Aksungur in blue

Turkey

- Turkish Naval Forces – 3 operational.
- Turkish Air Force - 5 operational.
- General Directorate of Security (Turkey): 1

Kyrgyzstan

- Kyrgyz Border Guard- 2 Delivered.

Chad

- Chadian Air Force- 2 Delivered.

Chadian Air Force released footage of its Aksungur fleet in April 2024.

=== Future operators ===
Algeria

- Algerian Air Force – 6 drones were ordered in October 2022.

Niger

Angola

- National Air Force of Angola- Unknown number on order.

Uzbekistan

- Uzbekistan Air and Air Defence Forces- Unknown number on order.

== Specifications ==
Data from Turkish Aerospace Industries, Jane's Information Group, Defence Turkey and Military Factory

General characteristics

- Capacity: >750 kg (1,650 lb) payload
- Length: 12.5 m (41 ft 0 in)
- Wingspan: 24.2 m (79 ft 5 in)
- Height: 3.84 m (12 ft 7 in)
- Empty weight: 1,800 kg (3,968 lb)
- Max takeoff weight: 3,300 kg (7,275 lb)
- Powerplant: 2 × TEI-PD170 4-cylinder liquid-cooled turbo-charged horizontally-opposed piston engine, 130–160 kW (170–220 hp) each
- Propellers: 3-bladed constant-speed pusher propeller

Performance

- Cruise speed: 250 km/h (160 mph, 130 kn)
- Range: 6,500 km (4,000 mi, 3,500 nmi)
- Communication range:
  - Line-of-sight propagation: >250 kilometres (155 mi)
  - Satellite Communications (SATCOM): >5,000 kilometres (3,107 mi)
- Endurance: Up to 50 hours
- Service ceiling: 12,192 m (40,000 ft)

Armament

- Hardpoints: 6 (Aksungur has 3 hardpoints on each wing with 500 kg, 300 kg and 150 kg capacities) , with provisions to carry combinations of:
  - Missiles:
    - CIRIT
  - ASW:
    - Possibly ROKETSAN DSH (Anti Submarine Warfare Rocket) and Roketsan Orka torpedoes for maritime patrol duties.
  - Bombs:
    - Up to 12 MAM: MAM-L and MAM-C precision-guided munitions
    - L-UMTAS
    - TEBER-81 (laser guided MK-81)
    - TEBER-82 (laser guided MK-82)
    - HGK-3 (Precision Guidance Kit)
    - KGK (82) (Winged Guidance Kit)
  - UAV
    - Süper Şimşek UAV System

Avionics

- Electro-optical reconnaissance, surveillance and targeting system:
  - Aselsan ASELFLIR 600 (option 1)
  - Aselsan ASELFLIR 500 (option 2)
- Electronic warfare: Electronic warfare support measures (ESM) and Electronic attack (EA) equipments
- Signals intelligence: Communications intelligence (COMINT) and Electronic intelligence (ELINT) equipments
- ComJam: Communication Jamming
- Satcom on the Move capable satellite communication (SATCOM) system inside radome
- Aselsan Fulmar 500-A Radar
- aselBUOY 100 P
- Radio Relay
- Air Launched Drone
- AIS (Automatic Identification System)
- PLS (Personnel Locator System)
- ELT (Emergency Locator Beacon)
- RVT (Remote Video Terminal)
- TCAS (Traffic Collision Avoidance System)

== See also ==
- Bayraktar Mini UAV
- Bayraktar TB2
- Bayraktar Akıncı
- Baykar Bayraktar TB3
- Bayraktar Kızılelma
- TAI Anka
- TAI Anka-3
- Vestel Karayel
