= Vestel Karayel =

Turkish unmanned combat aerial vehicle

Karayel
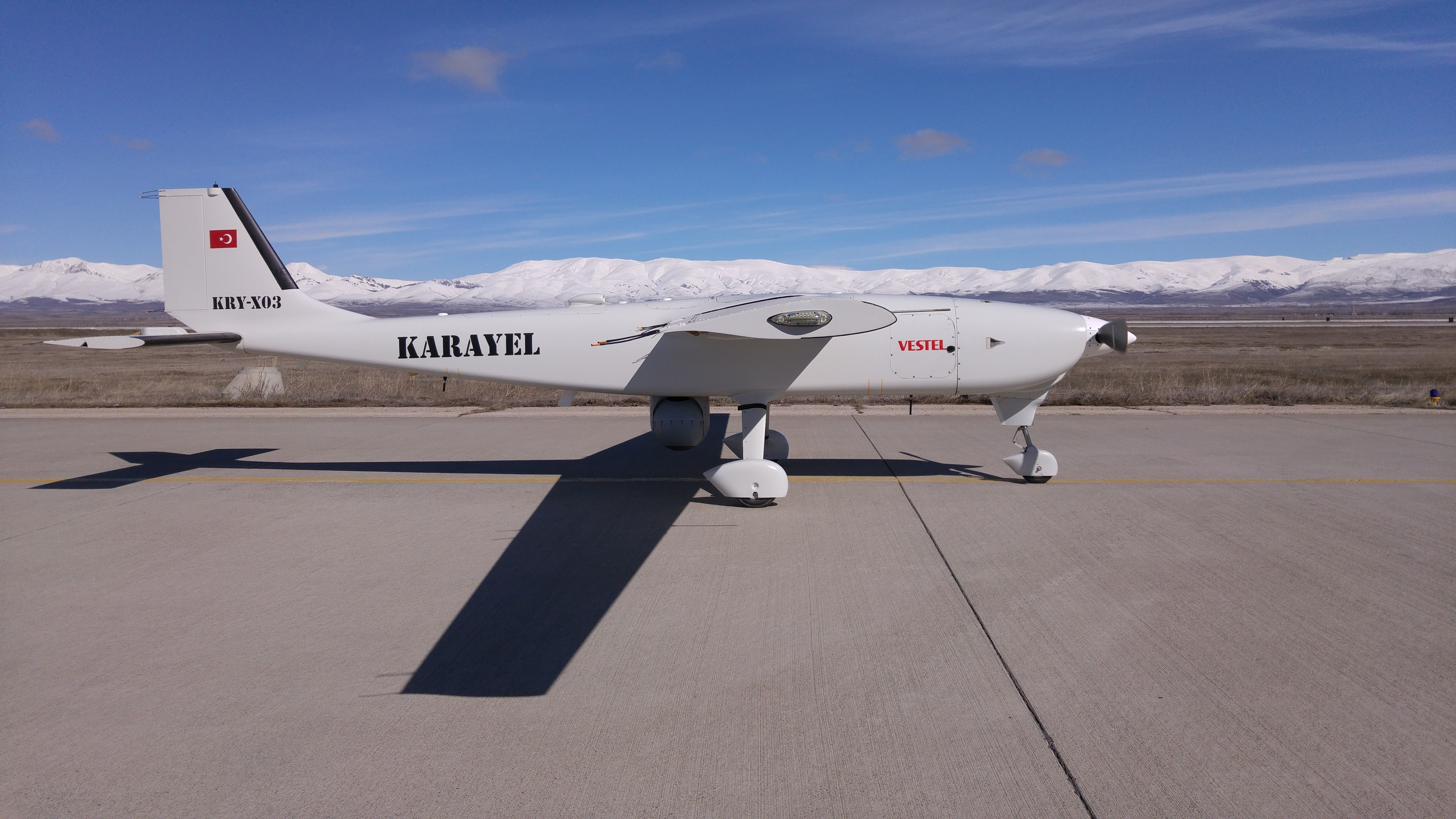
- Karayel

General information
- Type: Medium Altitude Long Endurance Unmanned surveillance and reconnaissance aerial vehicle and unmanned combat air vehicle (armed variant)
- National origin: Turkey
- Manufacturer: Lentatek
- Primary users: Turkish Armed Forces Armed Forces of Saudi Arabia
- Number built: 16+

History
- First flight: 30 April 2014

The Vestel Karayel is a surveillance, reconnaissance and later combat unmanned aerial vehicle system developed by Vestel Savunma (later the company renamed as Lentatek). The drone is currently operated by Turkish Armed Forces and the Armed Forces of Saudi Arabia.

== Design ==
The Karayel is designed and manufactured in accordance with NATO ‘Airworthiness’ standard; STANAG 4671. The Karayel system has novel triple redundant distributed avionics architecture which ensures protection against all kinds of uncontrolled crash. With this feature, systematic fault safety used only in manned aviation around the world until now, has been carried to an unmanned aerial vehicle for the first time with the Karayel. The aerial vehicle has the ability to protect against lightning thanks to the aluminum network grid on its composite structure. A de-Icing system automatically detects icing conditions allows operations in cold climates. The Karayel, which is an aerial reconnaissance and surveillance platform, can perform target marking, lighting and ammunition direction by its laser sensors and day/night target detection and identification by its camera system which it carries as payload.

== Specifications ==
Data from Vestel Savunma

General characteristics

- Crew: none on-board
- Length: 6.5 m (21 ft 4 in)
- Wingspan: 10.5 m (34 ft 5 in)
- Max takeoff weight: 550 kg (1,213 lb)
- Powerplant: 1 × unspecified , 72 kW (97 hp)
- Propellers: single blade, 1.45 m (4 ft 9 in) diameter

Performance

- Maximum speed: 150 km/h (92 mph, 80 kn)
- Endurance: 20 hours
- Service ceiling: 6,900 m (22,500 ft)

== Karayel-SU TUAV ==
Karayel-SU (SU; standing for Armed-Extended Wing) has a longer wingspan, as well as end-plates on its wing tips and two hardpoints for payload under each wing. Each one of the hardpoints can carry 30 kg, meaning that the total payload capacity of the Karayel-SU under its wings is 120 kg. The wing hardpoints can also be equipped with payloads other than munitions. The Karayel-SU also retains the ability to carry 50 kg EO/IR payload at the fuselage payload bay

=== Technicial Specifications ===
- Engine Power 1 × 97 HP (Sea Level)
- Maximum Takeoff Weight : 630 kg
- Wing Span : 13 m
- Total Length : 6.5 m
- Height : 2.11 m
- Wing Useful Load : 120 kg
- Trunk Payload : 50 kg
- Flight Speed : 60-80 knots
- Rate of Climb : 800 m/min
- Operational Altitude 18.000 ft
- Data Link Range: >150 km
- Landing Distance : <750 m
- Airborne Time : 20 hours without ammunition, 12 hours with 60 kg load and 8 hours with 120 kg loaded
- Navigation : Fully Autonomous or Manual, Day Camera (color) & IR Night Camera
- Useful Load : Laser Range Finder, Laser Pointer & Laser Target Marker
- Other Features : Triple redundant avionic architecture, fully autonomous take-off / flight / landing, Composite main structure.

=== Other variants ===
CTech SATCOM On-The-Move terminals for unmanned aerial vehicles

- DEV-KU-18 SATCOM On The Move Terminal mounted Vestel Karayel
- DEV-KA-12 SATCOM On The Move Terminal mounted Vestel Karayel

=== Armaments ===
- L-UMTAS (Long Range Anti tank Missile System)
- MAM: MAM-C and MAM-L precision-guided munitions
- Roketsan Cirit (70 mm Missile System)
- TUBITAK-SAGE Bozok Laser Guided Rockets
- TUBITAK-SAGE TOGAN - Air-to-surface launched 81 mm mortar munition

== Operators ==
- Saudi Arabia - 6 Karayel UAVs in use, with another 40 to be deployed since 2021 in a timeframe of 5 years for the Saudi Armed forces.
- Turkey - 10 Karayel-SU-TUAV-SOTM.

=== Possible sales ===
- Hungary - The drone was tested at the Pápa Air Base on 4 November 2021. There are also plans to produce a variant of the drone in Békéscsaba in a joint German-Turkish-Hungarian operation.

== Operational history ==
- On 31 December 2019, during the Saudi led intervention in Yemen, Houthis fighters announced their forces shot down Saudi drones, one in Razih district in Saada and another in the Red Sea port city of Hodeidah. Later the Houthis published footage of the downing and recovery of the remains of a Vestel Karayel drone from the Red Sea.
- On 6 January 2021, during the Saudi led intervention in Yemen, Houthi forces shot down a Vestel Karayel drone in al-Mahashimah, Al-Jawf province.
- On 7 March 2021, another Vestel Karayel drone is shot down in al-Maraziq, Al-Jawf province by Houthi air defenses. Later publishing footage of the wreckage of the drone.
- On 21 May 2022, one Vestel Karayel drone was shot down by Houthi fighters in Hajjah governorate. Later Houthis released footage of the drone wreck.

== See also ==
- List of unmanned aerial vehicles § Turkey
- Bayraktar TB2
- Baykar Bayraktar TB3
- Baykar Bayraktar Akıncı
- Bayraktar Kızılelma
- TAI Anka
- TAI Aksungur
- TAI Anka-3
