= TAI Anka =

Family of Turkish medium-altitude long-endurance UAVs

Anka
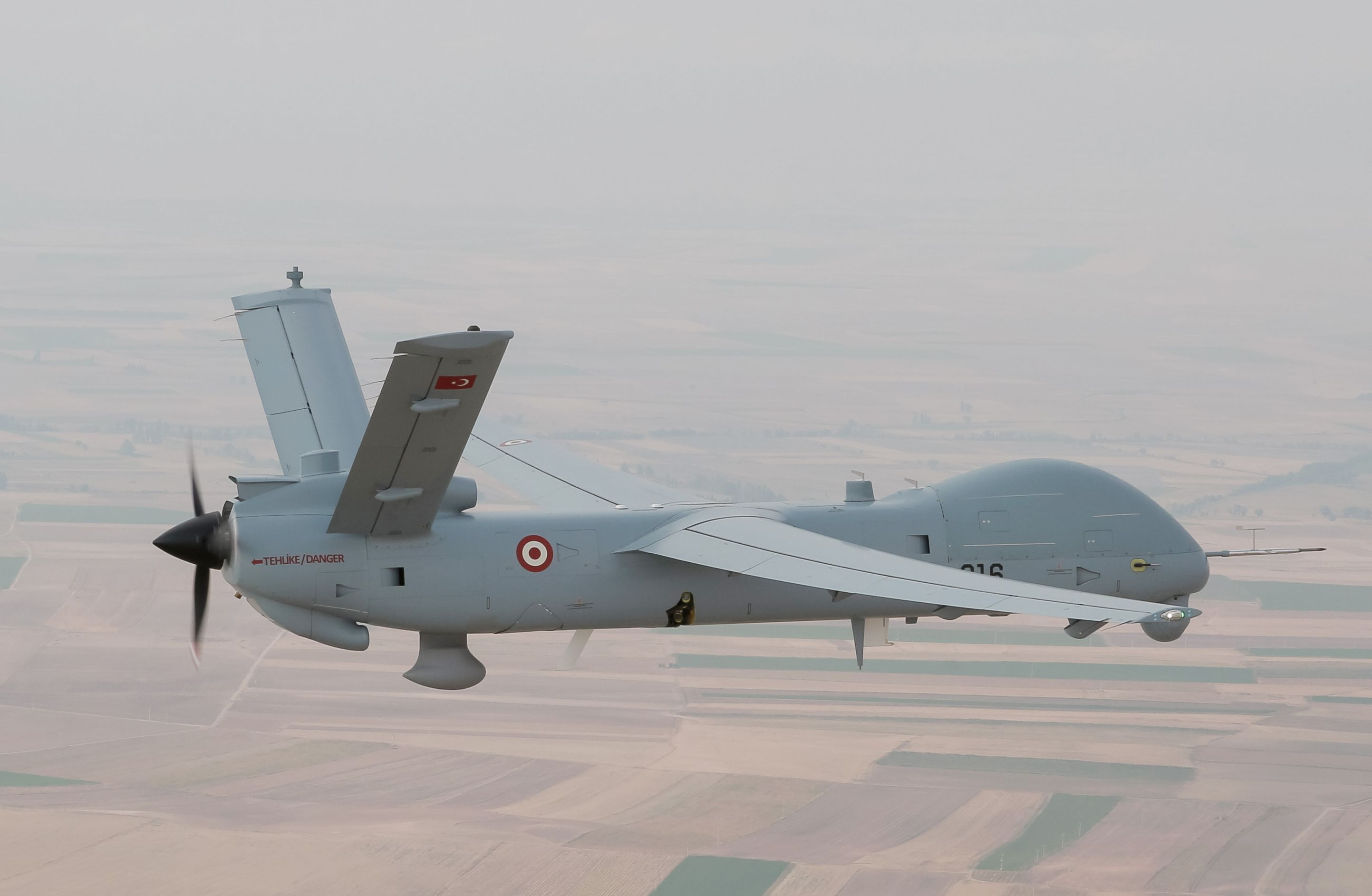
- Anka-S

General information
- Type: Unmanned combat aerial vehicle
- National origin: Turkey
- Manufacturer: Turkish Aerospace Industries
- Status: In service
- Primary users: Turkish Air Force General Directorate of Security
- Number built: 102

History
- Manufactured: 2010 - present
- Introduction date: 16 July 2010
- First flight: 30 December 2010
- Developed into: TAI Aksungur

The TAI Anka is a family of medium-altitude long-endurance unmanned aerial vehicles developed by Turkish Aerospace Industries for the Turkish Air Force and export. The drone is named after Phoenix, a mythological creature called Zümrüd-ü Anka in Turkish. Envisioned in the early 2000s for aerial surveillance and reconnaissance missions, Anka has evolved into a modular platform with synthetic-aperture radar, precision-guided munitions and satellite communication. The aircraft is also equipped for electronic warfare (EW) and signals intelligence (SIGINT) missions. The aircraft used common avionics architecture and ground segment with TAI Anka-3 and TAI Aksungur. The aircraft is capable of conducting autonomous operations including automatic take-off and landing.

The basic version, Anka-A is an unmanned surveillance and reconnaissance aerial vehicle used only for intelligence, surveillance, target acquisition, and reconnaissance missions. Introduced in 2010, Anka granted its first contract in 2013 from Turkish Air Force. The air force requested further studies in advanced uninterrupted intelligence, reconnaissance and communication technologies. The aircraft was set to a long development phase to introduce national mission computer, national flight control system, synthetic aperture radar, indigenous engine and friend or foe identification system. Anka-B made its first flight in 2014 and completed factory tests in 2015. In 2017, Turkish Aerospace Industries introduced Anka-S and the aircraft entered service with the Turkish Air Force.

Turkish Aerospace Industries offers the aircraft in two versions, Anka-B and Anka-S. Anka-I was developed specifically for Turkey's National Intelligence Organization for signal intelligence. Anka has accumulated more than 90,000 flight hours as of March 2021.

== Design ==
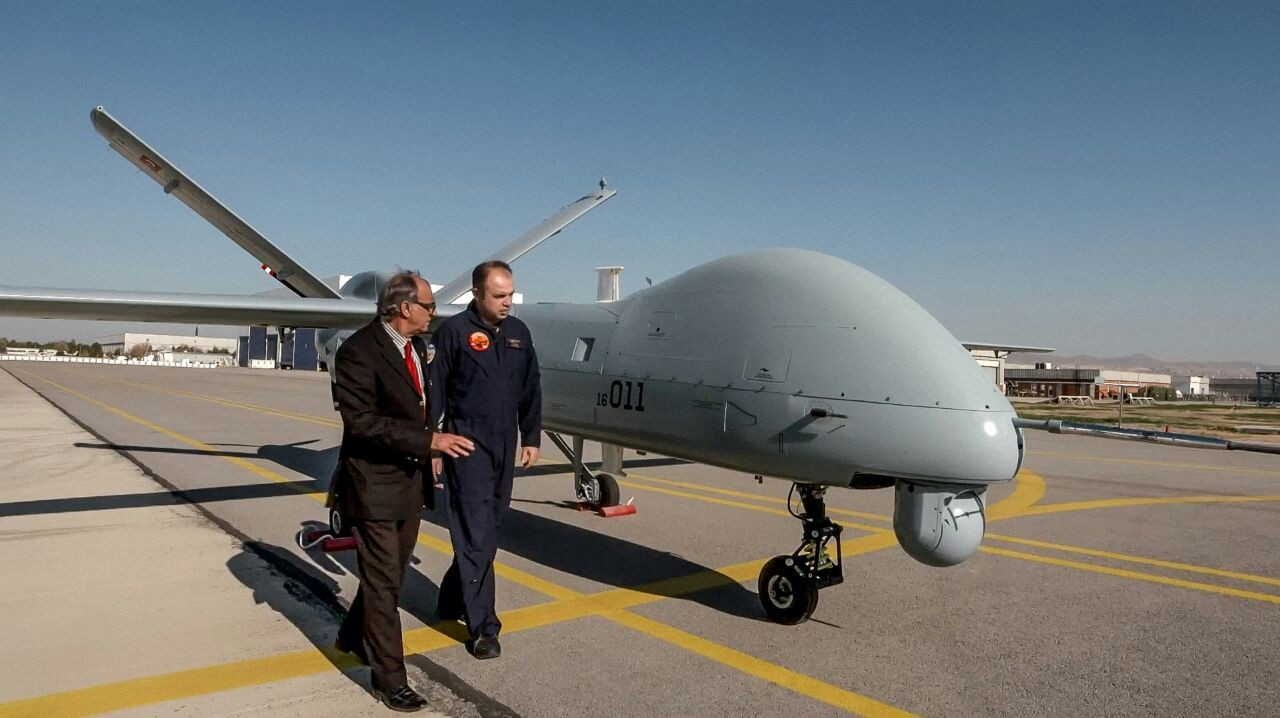
Anka

The Anka platform incorporates a redundant architecture designed to support autonomous operations and system reliability. The aircraft utilizes an Automatic Take-Off and Landing System (ATOLS) that enables operation without operator intervention. This system relies on dual positioning sources, integrating data from a Radar Tracking System and Differential GPS (DGPS) for navigational precision. In the event of a communication severance with ground control, the vehicle is programmed to autonomously return to the base and execute a landing. It also retains the capability to perform emergency landings on alternative fields if the primary take-off location cannot be reached. Data transmission is managed through two encrypted, redundant data link systems for line-of-sight (LOS) operations. For missions requiring range beyond line-of-sight (BLOS), the aircraft is equipped with a Satellite Communication (SATCOM) system.

The electrical power generation system consists of an engine-driven alternator supported by a battery backup. This redundancy ensures that critical systems remain powered via batteries in the event of an alternator failure. Physically, the airframe features retractable landing gear to prevent obstruction of the payload's line of sight during reconnaissance missions. To facilitate operations in adverse weather, the wings and tail surfaces are equipped with anti-icing systems. A single Anka system consists of three air vehicles (A/V), a ground control station (GCS), a ground data terminal (GDT), an automatic take-off and landing system (ATOLS), a transportable image exploitation system (TIES), a remote video terminal (RVT), and various ground support equipment (GSE).

Designed for all-weather day and night operations, the Anka performs real-time image intelligence, surveillance, and reconnaissance (ISR), including the tracking and identification of stationary or moving targets. The system features an open architecture to support modular mission requirements, though the standard sensor payload typically consists of:
Electro-optic sensors: A color day camera (EO day TV) and a Forward-Looking Infrared (FLIR) turret integrated with a laser rangefinder, laser designator, and spotter camera.
Radar systems: A Synthetic-Aperture Radar (SAR) capable of Ground Moving Target Indication (GMTI) and Inverse Synthetic-Aperture Radar (ISAR) operations.

The platform is also equipped with a digital flight control system, electro-mechanical actuators, and flight control sensor systems such as GPS, pitot-static, air data computer, navigation sensor, transducers, temperature, pressure, displacement sensors, etc. The operations of the Anka-S are supported by the highly sophisticated ground control system and data link system with complete redundancy, developed by the Turkish defence company Savronik.

== Development ==
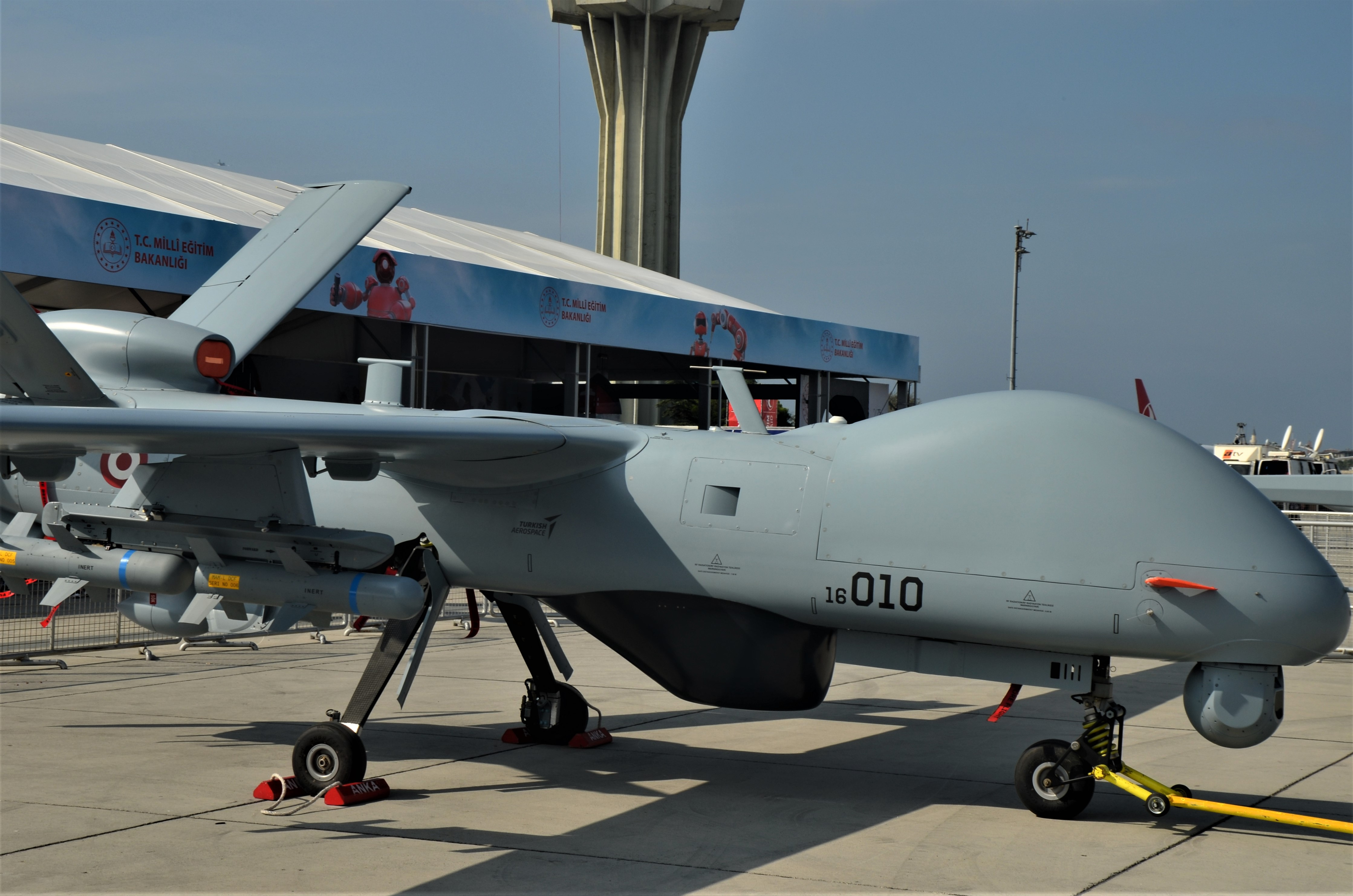
Anka-S at Teknofest 2019

The contract regarding the development of an indigenous Medium Altitude Long Endurance (MALE) Unmanned Aerial Vehicle (UAV) system for the reconnaissance requirements of the Turkish Armed Forces became effective on 24 December 2004. Within the framework of the program, a total of three prototypes and ground systems will be designed, developed, manufactured, and tested by mid-2011 as part of the prototype development phase. Subsequently, in 2012, the serial production phase of Anka-A would be launched and additional 10 systems (meaning 30 air vehicles) built for the Turkish Air Force.

- On 30 December 2010, the first TAI Anka unmanned aerial vehicle completed its debut flight, with 14 minutes of cruising, at 15:45 local time. Defence Minister Vecdi Gönül confirmed the flight.
- On 5 May 2011, TAI released the test flight video of Anka. Anka-A flew a test and calibration mission of 2h 30m.
- Turkish Aerospace Industries announced on 25 October 2011 that the Anka had successfully completed its subsequent flight and landing tests and that it will now be in the Turkish Air Force inventory in 2012 that is much earlier than expected. Footage released by TAI also shows the Anka landing successfully putting all speculation abouts its crash landings to rest.
- On 22 November 2011, the Anka held the follow-up test flight for 6 hours at 20,000 ft. The vehicle demonstrated its automatic take-off and landing system for the first time.
- On 5 January 2012, Defence Industry Executive Committee authorized Undersecretariat for Defence Industries to commence talks with Turkish Aerospace Industries for the serial production of 10 Anka vehicles.
- On 27 September 2012, an Anka prototype crashed during a flight test due to a technical problem.
- On 20 January 2013, Anka completed acceptance tests by the Turkish Air Force. The final acceptance tests were conducted near Ankara, and involved an 18‑hour‑long, 200 km ring flight. The tests also included a night landing in adverse weather conditions. The Anka has flown more than 140 hours and reached and altitude of 26,000 feet.
- On 13 May 2013, the Pakistan Aeronautical Complex, Kamra handed over the first batch of Anka UAV parts to Turkish Aerospace Industries during IDEF 2013 at Istanbul, Turkey.
- On 6 December 2013, another Anka UAV crashed in southeastern Turkey during a day flight.
- On 30 January 2015, Undersecretariat of Defense Industry announced that the new generation high performance Anka Blok-B unmanned aerial vehicle completed the tests of different autopilot and landing modes in the first flight with automatic take-off and landing
- Anka was extensively used during Operation Euphrates Shield While the aircraft participated in many counter-terrorism operations within the Turkish Armed Forces, it also played an active role during operations in Syria and Iraq such as Operation Olive Branch, Operation Claw (2019–2020), Operation Peace Spring, Operation Spring Shield, Operation Kiran and Operations Claw-Eagle and Tiger.In this way, useful experiences was made in the development of the aircraft.
- The first deliveries of the ANKA-S version began in early 2017.
- Unmanned target drone Şimşek, manufactured by TAI, integrated into ANKA UAV with a catapult, was launched from the Anka-B aircraft. Consequently, for the first time, a target unmanned aerial vehicle was launched from a MALE class UAV.
- Istanbul based CTech company, has developed portable satellite communication systems with domestic facilities. The system was first integrated into TUSAŞ (Turkish Aerospace) production Anka-S UAVs.
- In May 2021, Turkish Aerospace Industries updated product specifications. With the new update, Anka's payload capacity and endurance were revised to 350+ kilograms and 30 hours, respectfully.

== Variants ==
=== Anka +A ===
On 19 July 2012, the Turkish Defense Industry Executive Committee (SSIK) announced that Turkish Aerospace Industries had commenced research and development for the design and development of a "hunter killer" High-Altitude Long-Endurance version of the Anka UAV, named the Anka +A. It was planned that Anka +A will carry Cirit missiles of Turkey's ROKETSAN. The weight of Anka +A UCAV would be more than 4 tons compared to Anka Block A's 1.5 tons. It was highly expected that the UCAV would be presented to public in the events of IDEF'13 on 7–10 May 2013.

=== Anka-B ===
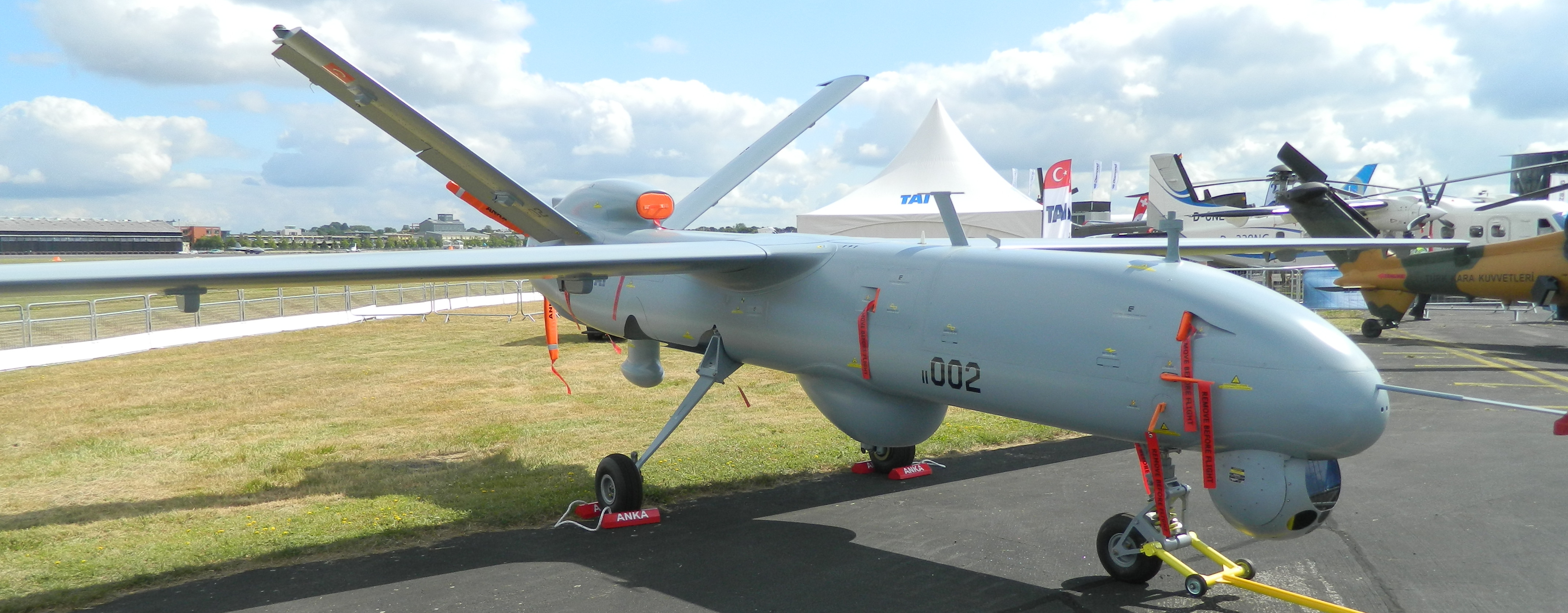
Anka-B with SAR Radar

On 30 January 2015, the Anka-B completed its maiden flight successfully. Anka Block B is an improved version of the Anka Block A. The UAV carries an Aselsan synthetic aperture radar/ground moving-target indicator payload in addition to the platform's electro-optical/infrared sensor. During the maiden flight, Anka-B successfully performed "basic shakedown" and auto-landing. The Anka Block B also has a greater payload capacity than that of the Anka-A which includes SAR/ISAR/GMTI radar (in addition to the cameras of Anka A) that obtains and remits high resolution intelligence data back to base. The Anka Block B paved the way for weaponisation of the platform in the foreseeable future. Anka Block B passed 30.000 feet, 26 hours and 200 km radius during the test flights. Turkish Air Force ordered 10 Anka Block B in 2013 at a cost of $300 million.

=== Anka-S ===
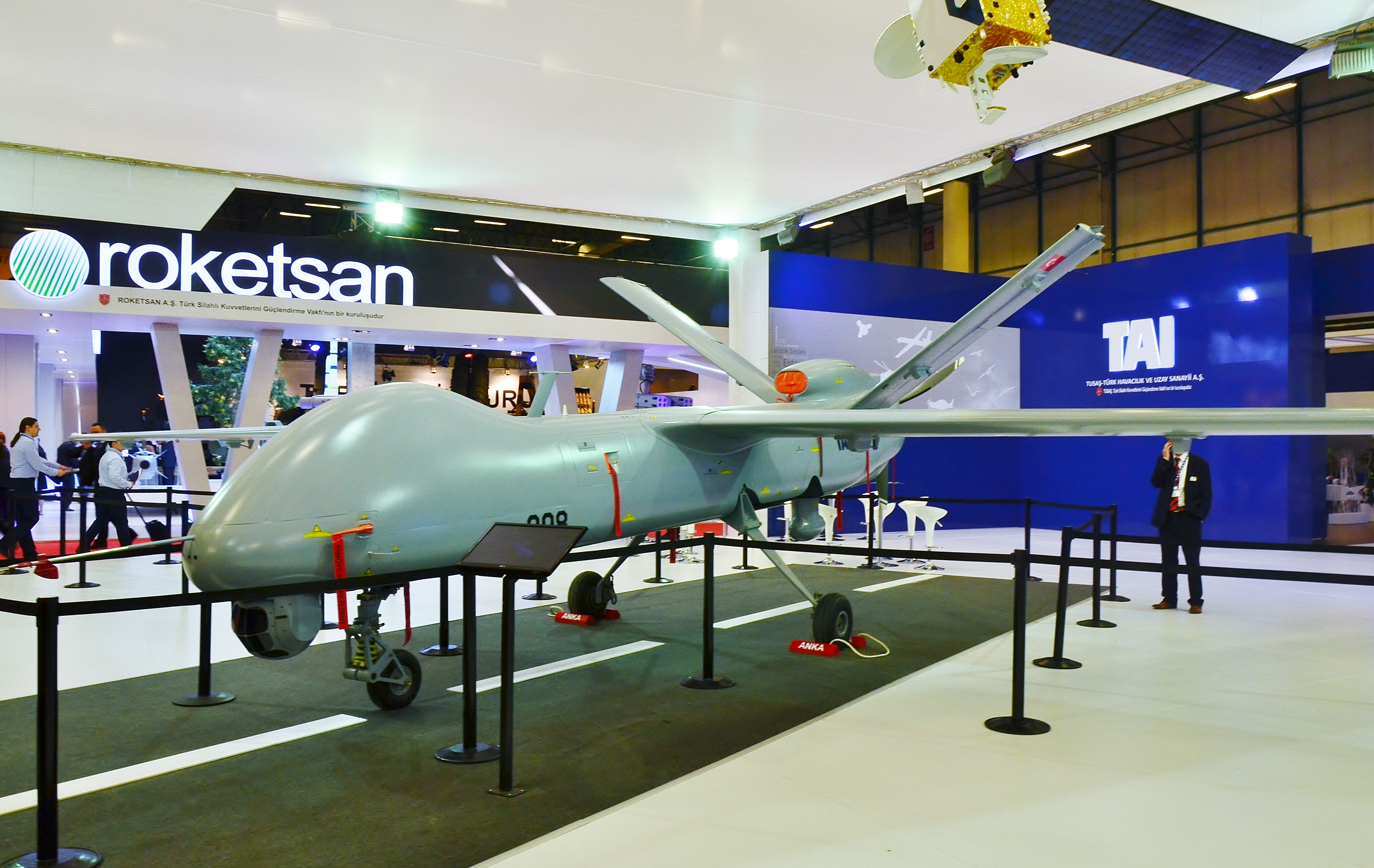
Anka-S with modified radome for SATCOM

Anka-S is a serial production configuration of Anka. It is equipped with a SATCOM antenna and a national flight control computer. Like Block A and Block B, Anka-S is powered by Thielert Centurion 2.0S. On the other hand, Turkish Engine Industries (TEI) indigenously developed TEI-PD170 and TEI-PD180ST engines that are capable of running with diesel and JP-8 jet fuel.

On 25 October 2013, Turkish Undersecretariat for Defence Industry (SSM) ordered 10 Anka-S UAVs and 12 ground control stations for $290 million ($220.6 million + TRY 137 million). The UAVs would be delivered in three batches (2+4+4).

In 2016, media reported that the TAI was manufacturing 4 Anka-S UAVs for the armed forces. The first two of these aircraft were to be equipped with StarFIRE 380-HDL FLIR payload. However, these would be replaced with Aselsan CATS later on.

On 17 August 2018, Directorate for Defence Industries announced that the Anka-S completed its first live fire tests. The platform was tested with MAM-L ammunition developed by Roketsan. In September, Ismail Demir, director of Turkey's defence industry authority, shared a picture of the first Anka-S equipped with Aselsan CATS optical system. TAI delivered 2 more Anka-S to Turkish Air Force in September 2018, increasing the Anka-S inventory of Turkish Air Force to 8 aircraft. TAI planned to deliver a total of 10 Anka-S to Turkish Air Force before 2019.

In August 2018, the Anka-S carried out Turkey's first "satellite-controlled airstrike" according to the Turkish Presidency of Defense Industries. In December, Anka completed its first flight with an engine manufactured domestically. In 2019, Anka broke its endurance records, flying longer than 24 hours.

Although Anka have an operational range of about 100 miles, satellite-enabled Anka-S is capable of flying beyond "line of sight".

=== Anka-I ===
Anka-I is an electronic warfare and intelligence UAV developed for the National Intelligence Organization. The aircraft is equipped with electronic warfare and intelligence systems (ELINT and COMINT).

== Operational history ==
On 5 February 2016 Anka drones performed its first mission flight in Turkey's eastern province of Elazığ performing a four-hour exploration and observation flight.

In 2018, during the course of Turkey's Operation Olive Branch, the UAV for the first time used the Smart Micro Munition, MAM-L.

During the course of the Turkish involvement in the Syrian civil war, Syrian Air defenses shot down an Anka-S near Dadikah, southeastern countryside of Idlib on 25 February 2020.

On 27 February 2020 following the Turkish losses inflicted by Russian-backed Syrian government in northwestern Syria, Turkey launched Operation Spring Shield, with multiple Anka-S and Bayraktar TB2 drones deployed extensively. The deployment was assessed by experts to be a tactical game-changer.

On 1 March 2020, an Anka-S was shot down while operating in the Syrian province of Idlib by an air defence system, near the town of Saraqib.

On 19 April 2020, amid the Second Libyan Civil War a combat drone was shot down in Alwhaska, near Misrata, GNA sources claimed the downed drone was a LNA Wing Loong II in turn LNA claimed they shot down a TAI Anka combat drone, however a UN Security Council report asserted the downed drone was a TAI Anka drone operated by GNA.

On 23 May 2020, a second Anka drone backing the GNA forces was reported lost in Tarhouna, shot down by LNA air defenses.

On 5 October 2023, an Anka-S was shot down over northern Syria by a USAF F-16 over the skies of Al-Hasaka.

=== Export history ===
On 23 November 2012, Egypt signed a contract with Turkish Aerospace Industries to purchase 10 Anka UAV's. The deal was later cancelled. Some sources claimed that the cancellation was due to the disagreements between AK Parti government of then Prime Minister Recep Tayyip Erdoğan and the Egyptian military regime led by General Abdel Fattah el-Sisi, while other sources stated the deal was never finalized. Recep Tayyip Erdogan was supporting the first democratically elected president in Egypt's, who had won the Egyptian presidential election in 2012, before getting ousted in a military coup on July 3, 2013.

In November 2017, a Turkish official confirmed talks had been ongoing with Saudi Arabia since 2013 for the purchase of 6 systems, but no official contract had been signed yet. The official stated specific requirements regarding reconnaissance capability and a possible transfer of technology to Saudi Arabia. A different source noted budgetary challenges to be overcome due to Saudi Arabia demanding a lower price due to lower oil prices constraining Saudi income.

In late November 2018, during IDEAS 2018, it was confirmed that Pakistan Navy is interested in Anka-S and has begun negotiations with Turkish Aerospace Industries for this UAV. In December 2019, TAI has opened its first office in Pakistan at the country's National Science & Technology Park. On August 24, 2021, Turkish Aerospace Industries (TAI) signed a contract with Pakistan's National Engineering and Science Commission (NESCOM) to jointly produce Anka military drones, the company revealed in a statement.

A contract was signed in March 2020 with Tunisia for three Anka-S and three command centers worth US$80 million. On 13 November 2021, Tunisia officially received its first Anka-S UAV.

Indonesia ordered twelve Anka in February 2023 along with its support system, training, and technology transfer for US$300 million. Six units which are manufactured in Turkey will be sent to Indonesia, while another six will be assembled in Indonesia with Indonesian Aerospace through technology transfer. Of the total twelve units, six would be given to the Air Force, while each the Army and Navy would receive three units. The first Anka for the Air Force was delivered in September 2025.

Malaysia purchased three Anka-S UAV's for around US$85 million during the 2023 Langkawi International Maritime and Aerospace Exhibition, with media reports indicating that they would be based at RMAF Labuan Air Base on the northern part of Borneo to provide maritime surveillance over the South China Sea in general and Malaysia’s Exclusive Economic Zone specifically. The UAV would be delivered to Malaysia in February 2026.

== Operators ==
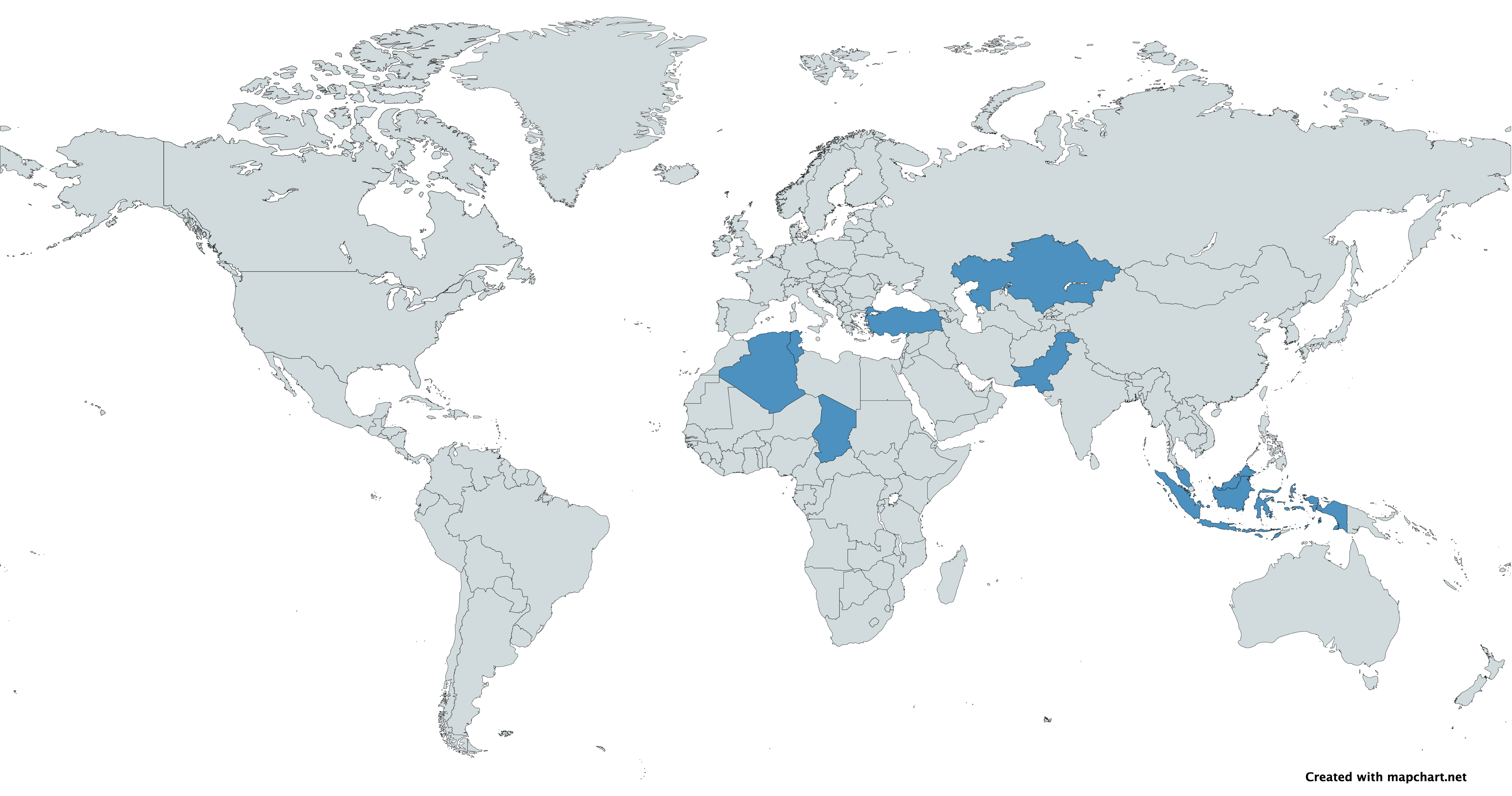
Map with users of the Anka in blue

=== Current operators ===
Algeria

- Algerian People's National Army — 10 on order

Indonesia

- Indonesian Air Force — Unspecified number has been delivered, 6 on order.

Malaysia

- Royal Malaysian Air Force — 3 Anka-S systems, purchased for around MYR 400 million (approximately US$85 million). The agreement was signed at the Langkawi International Maritime and Aerospace Exhibition (LIMA) in May 2023, and the UAVs to be received in February 2026. They will be stationed at Labuan Air Base. These unarmed Anka-S drones are intended to strengthen the Royal Malaysian Air Force’s (RMAF) maritime surveillance role over the South China Sea and to monitor foreign incursions into Malaysia’s Exclusive Economic Zone. The acquisition includes ground control stations, support equipment, and training. Despite the platform’s capability to carry weapons, Malaysian authorities have not ordered munitions at this stage, although the armed forces are reportedly considering additional acquisitions in future phases.

Kazakhstan

- Kazakh Air Defense Forces — Kazakhstan signed an agreement in 2022 to buy 3 TAI made Anka drones and co-manufacture 30 additional units inside Kazakhstan. 3 Anka UAVs were delivered.

Pakistan

- Pakistan Air Force — Components also manufactured under license at Pakistan Aeronautical Complex, Kamra

Tunisia

- Tunisian Air Force — 5 active. A contract was signed in March 2020 for 3 Anka-S and 3 command centers at US$80 million. The country made its first Anka UAV operational on 13 November 2021. 5 Anka-S UAVs were delivered.

Turkey

- Turkish Air Force — 36 active.
- Turkish National Intelligence Organization — Anka-I variant
- Turkish Naval Forces — 8 active
- Gendarmerie General Command — 6 Anka-S

=== Future operators ===
Indonesia

- Indonesian Army — 3 on order.
- Indonesian Navy — 3 on order.

Uzbekistan

- TUSAŞ announced on its official X page that the company has sold Anka UCAV to Uzbekistan in January 2025 without mentioning further details.

== Specifications (Anka-S) ==
Data from Turkish Aerospace Industries, VOI Media and Naval News

=== General characteristics ===
- Crew: 0 on board
- Length: 8.6 m (28 ft 3 in)
- Wing span: 17.5 m (57 ft 5 in)
- Max. take-off mass: 1,700 kg (3,750 lb)
- Payload: 350 kg (772 lb)
- Powerplant: 1 × 130 kW (170 hp) TEI-PD170
- Propeller: 3-bladed propeller
- Fuel type: Diesel and JP-8 jet fuel

=== Performance ===
- Maximum speed: ~217 km/h (117 kn; 135 mph)
- Cruise speed: ~204 km/h (110 kn; 127 mph)
- Communication range:
  - Line-of-sight propagation: > 250 km (155 mi; 135 nmi)
  - Satellite Communications (SATCOM): > 2,500 km (1,553 mi; 1,350 nmi)
- Service ceiling: 30,000 ft (9,144 m)
- Endurance: Up to 30 hours

=== Armaments ===
- Hardpoints: 2 underwing hardpoints capable of carrying up to 4 munitions simultaneously, configured for flexible combinations of:
  - Roketsan MAM-L (smart micro munition, thermobaric or HE fragmentation)
  - Roketsan MAM-C (smart micro munition, multi-purpose warhead)
  - TUBITAK-SAGE BOZOK laser-guided bomb
  - Roketsan Cirit laser-guided missile system
  - Roketsan L-UMTAS long range laser-guided anti tank missile
  - Süper Şimşek turbojet-powered target drone/loitering munition
  - TAI Şimşek GPS-guided cruise missile variant

=== Avionics ===
- Aselsan made synthetic-aperture radar.
- Electro-optical reconnaissance, surveillance and targeting system:
  - Aselsan ASELFLIR 500 (option 1)
  - Wescam MX-15D (option 2)
  - Aselsan CATS (option 3)
- Electronic warfare: Electronic warfare support measures (ESM) and Electronic attack (EA) equipments
- Signals intelligence: Communications intelligence (COMINT) and Electronic intelligence (ELINT) equipments
- Fulmar 200-A Synthetic Aperture Radar Pod System
- Satcom on the Move capable satellite communication (SATCOM) system inside radome:
  - CTech SkyARX airborne SATCOM antenna (option 1)
  - ViaSat VR-18C airborne SATCOM antenna (option 2)

== See also ==
- Unmanned Air Vehicle
- Joint Direct Attack Munition

Aircraft of comparable role, configuration, and era

- Bayraktar TB2
- Vestel Karayel
- MQ-1 Predator
- MQ-1C Warrior
- IAI Heron
- Shahed 129
- Fotros
- CASC Rainbow CH-4
- CAIG Wing Loong

Related lists

- List of unmanned aerial vehicles
