= TB3 =

TB3 may refer to:

- Baykar Bayraktar TB3, unmanned combat aerial vehicle
- Tupolev TB-3, Soviet monoplane heavy bomber
