= SATCOM =

SATCOM or Satcom may refer to:

- Satcom (satellite), a fleet of early geostationary communications satellites
- Communications satellite

== See also ==
- FLTSATCOM, a former U.S. Navy satellite system
- Satcom on the Move
- Satellite phone
