= Baykar Bayraktar TB3 =

Turkish unmanned combat aerial vehicle

Bayraktar TB3 / Astore Levante
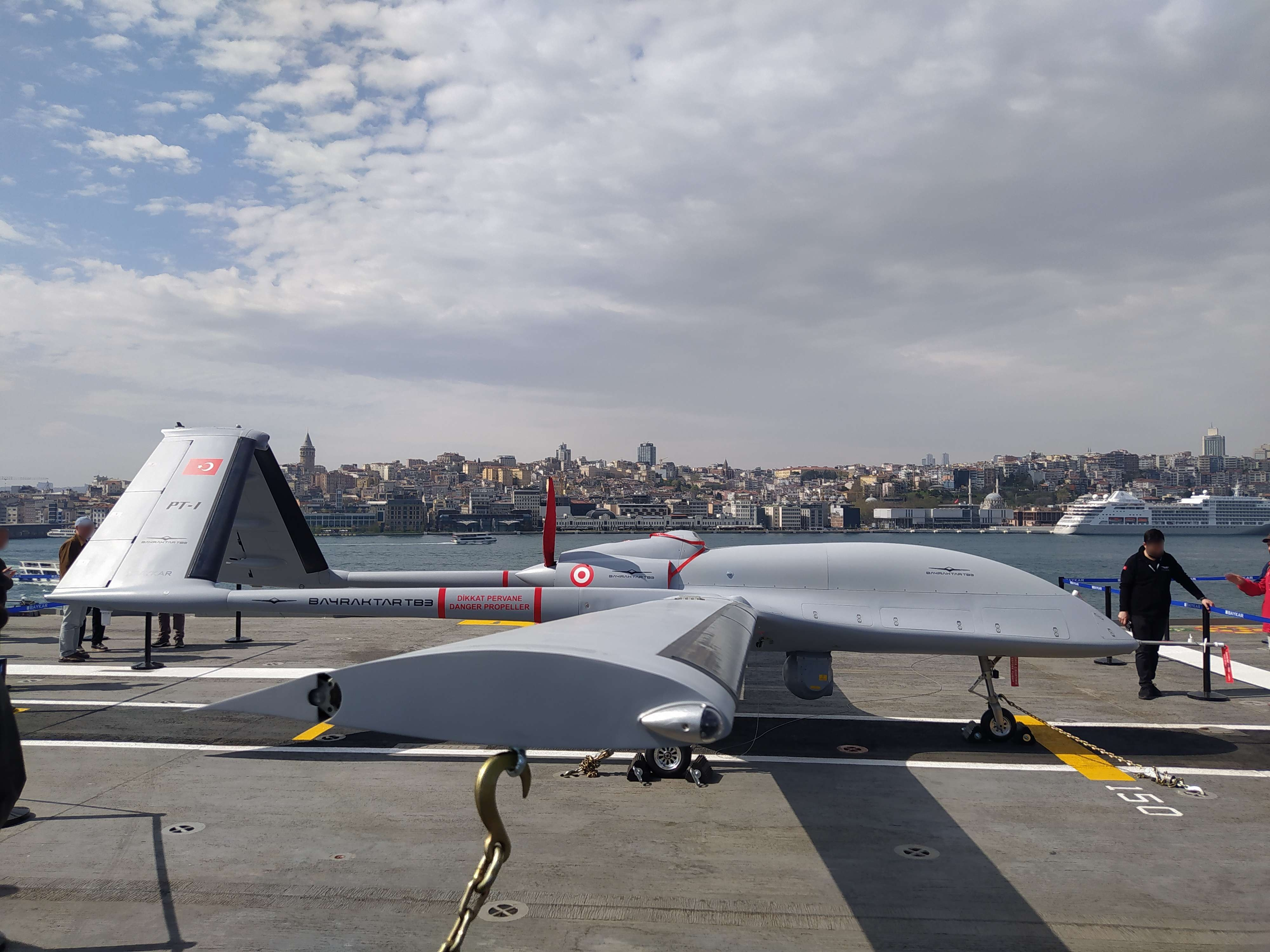
- Baykar Bayraktar TB3 on the deck of TCG Anadolu

General information
- Type: Carrier-based and land-based unmanned combat aerial vehicle (UCAV)
- National origin: Turkey
- Manufacturer: Baykar; LBA Systems (joint Baykar and Leonardo partnership)
- Designer: Baykar
- Status: In service
- Primary user: Turkish Armed Forces
- Number built: Unknown number of serial production + 4 prototypes

History
- Introduction date: September 2025
- First flight: 27 October 2023
- Developed from: Baykar Bayraktar TB2

The Baykar Bayraktar TB3 is a Turkish carrier-based medium-altitude long-endurance (MALE) unmanned combat aerial vehicle (UCAV) capable of short-range landing and take-off, produced by Baykar. Baykar Bayraktar TB3 is the world's first operational, full-size, carrier-based UAV capable of taking off from and landing on the short-flight deck of aircraft carriers. Its joint Turkish-Italian version is known as Astore Levante.

== Development ==
Selçuk Bayraktar first unveiled the Bayraktar TB3 on October 29, 2020. In his announcement, Bayraktar mentioned the testing of a domestic engine, presumed to be the TEI-PD170 or its derivative, which would be integrated into the Bayraktar Akıncı HALE UAV and the Bayraktar TB3. Describing the engine as having "by far the highest performance values in its class, worldwide", Selçuk Bayraktar highlighted its capabilities.

Selçuk Bayraktar later elaborated on the Bayraktar TB3, stating, "We are developing an aircraft that lands and takes off from an aircraft carrier, unique in its class. It has folding wings, can land on an aircraft carrier, and can carry heavier munitions. It is around 1200 kilograms."

The developer of TB3, Baykar Defense, shared the first computer-generated images of the deployed TB3 on TCG Anadolu, the first amphibious assault ship of Turkey, on July 21, 2021, via Twitter. It was revealed that the TB3 would operate alongside Bayraktar Kızılelma, which is equipped with a jet engine.

In February 2025, Indonesia ordered 60 TB3 UAV.

=== Development timeline ===
- 27 March 2023: First prototype of the TB3 has been made public.
- 13 October 2023: Successful completion of TB3's first test run.
- 20 October 2023: Conducted the initial take-off and landing test, achieving high speeds and briefly taking the wheels off the ground, without fully flying into the sky.
- 27 October 2023: Maiden flight took place, just two days before celebrating the 100th Anniversary of the Republic of Turkey.
- 11 November 2023: The aircraft flew with its landing gear retracted for the first time.
- 1 June 2024: The first successful ski-jump ramp test of the TB3 was conducted on a mainland ramp, which was carefully designed to replicate the TCG Anadolu's deck.
- 19 November 2024: The TB3 drone successfully took off from and landed on the deck of the Turkish amphibious assault ship TCG Anadolu. It was the first time a fixed-wing unmanned aircraft of this size and class had successfully taken off and landed on a Landing Helicopter Dock (LHD) that Turkey has repurposed to serve as a drone carrier.

== Operational history ==
On 18 February 2026, the Bayraktar TB3 successfully performed a flight demonstration in the Baltic region during NATO's Steadfast Dart 2026 exercise. The drone operated effectively in strong winds, freezing temperatures and heavy snowfall. The drone also successfully hit surface targets at sea with two MAM-L precision-guided munitions. After this, the Bayraktar TB3 also completed an eight-hour joint sortie with multiple Eurofighter Typhoon fighters of the German Air Force in Baltic Sea during the exercise. During this exercise, the Bayraktar TB-3 was launched from the Turkish Naval Forces's TCG Anadolu, the world's first military drone carrier ship, and covered 1,700 kilometers on its mission. The drone also captured aerial video of the Eurofighter Typhoon using its ASELFLIR 500 electro-optical reconnaissance, surveillance and targeting system made by the Turkish company Aselsan. This mission marked a significant integration of unmanned aerial vehicles with advanced fighter jets in a multinational drill with performing manned-unmanned teaming. The operation demonstrated the drone's capability to operate effectively within high-intensity alliance maneuvers.

== Variants ==
=== Astore Levante ===
LBA Systems, a company founded by Baykar and Leonardo, changed some of the systems of Bayraktar TB3 and named it Astore Levante. Astore Levante’s systems will include Leonardo’s systems such as LEOSS-T EO/IR, BriteStorm integrated EW system, IFF428 Mod 4/5 IFF system, SDR SRT-800 radio, Gabbiano T-80UL rotating multi-function radar, Osprey 30 multi-function AESA radar, SAGE ESM system, and the ULISSES sonobuoy processing system. The weapons are the same as Bayraktar TB3.

== Operators ==
=== Current operators ===
Turkey

- Turkish Naval Forces: Deployed on board the amphibious assault ship TCG Anadolu.
- Turkish Land Forces: Entered service in September 2025.

=== Future operators ===
Indonesia

- Indonesian Navy: In February 2025, Indonesia signed an agreement during a Turkish presidential visit to acquire 60 TB3 units along with joint production rights. The aircraft are expected to operate aboard the cruiser/carrier Giuseppe Garibaldi, which Indonesia has expressed interest in acquiring.

Italy

- Italian Air Force: 6 Astore Levante variant on order.
- Italian Navy: Planned for deployment aboard the Italian aircraft carrier Cavour.

Spain

- Spanish Navy: Reported in May 2026 to be in initial discussions with Turkey regarding unmanned aircraft acquisitions, including the TB3. The evaluation comes amid efforts to identify drone-based alternatives for operations on the amphibious assault ship Juan Carlos I, following the scheduled retirement of its AV-8B Harrier II fleet.

== Specifications (Bayraktar TB3) ==
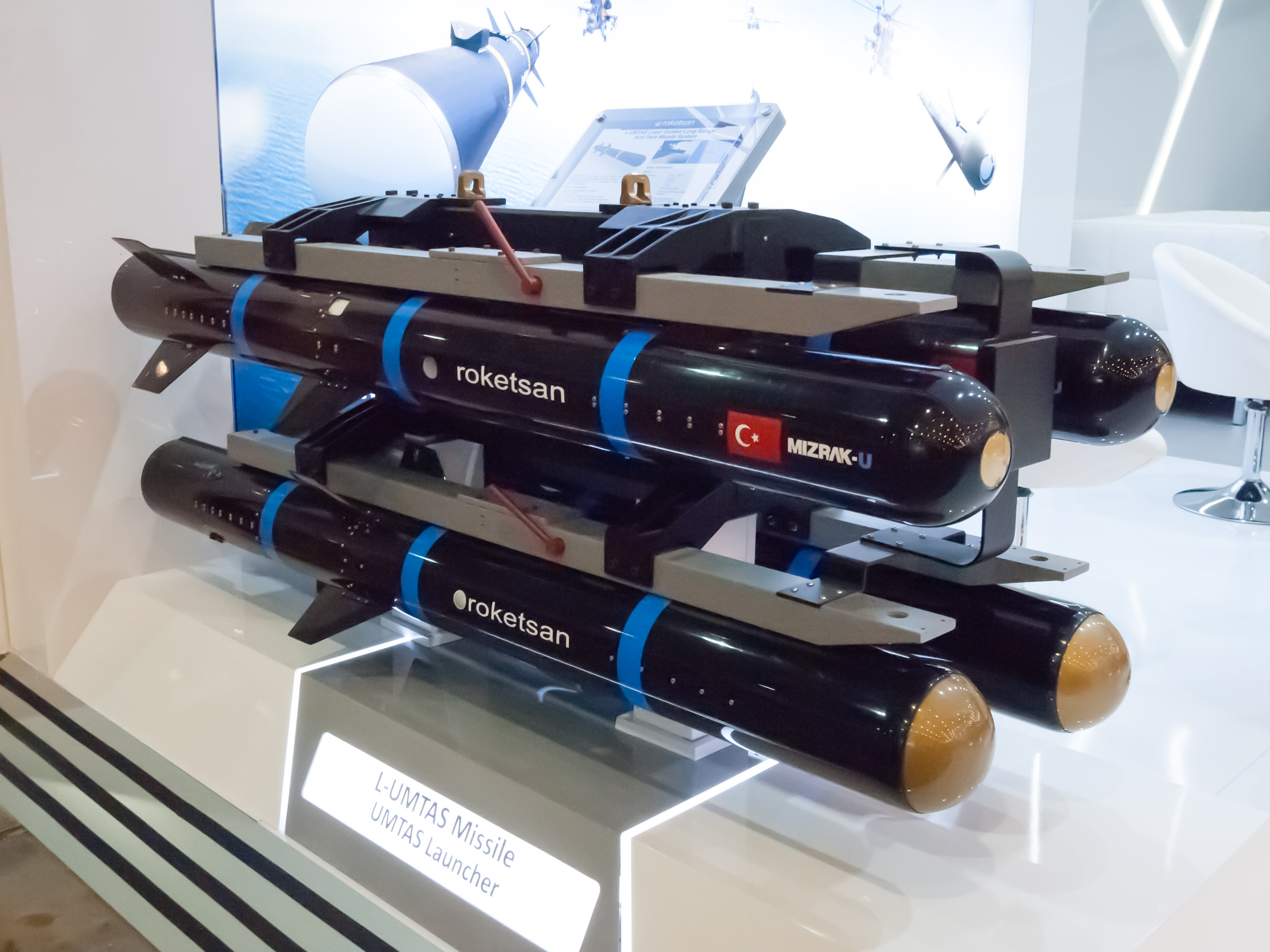
UMTAS missile to be used in TB3

General characteristics Performance

Data from the official Baykar infographic.

=== General characteristics ===
- Crew: 0 onboard
- Length: 8.35 m (27.4 ft)
- Height: 2.6 m (8.5 ft)
- Wing span: 14 m (46 ft)
- Max take-off weight: 1,450 kg (3,200 lb)
- Payload capacity: 280 kg (620 lb)
- Powerplant: 1 × TEI-PD170 or 1 × TEI-PD200

=== Performance ===
- Maximum speed: 160 kn (180 mph; 300 km/h)
- Cruise speed: 125 kn (144 mph; 232 km/h)
- Communication range: line-of-sight propagation
- Operational range: 1,100 NM (1,300 mi; 2,000 km)

=== Armaments ===
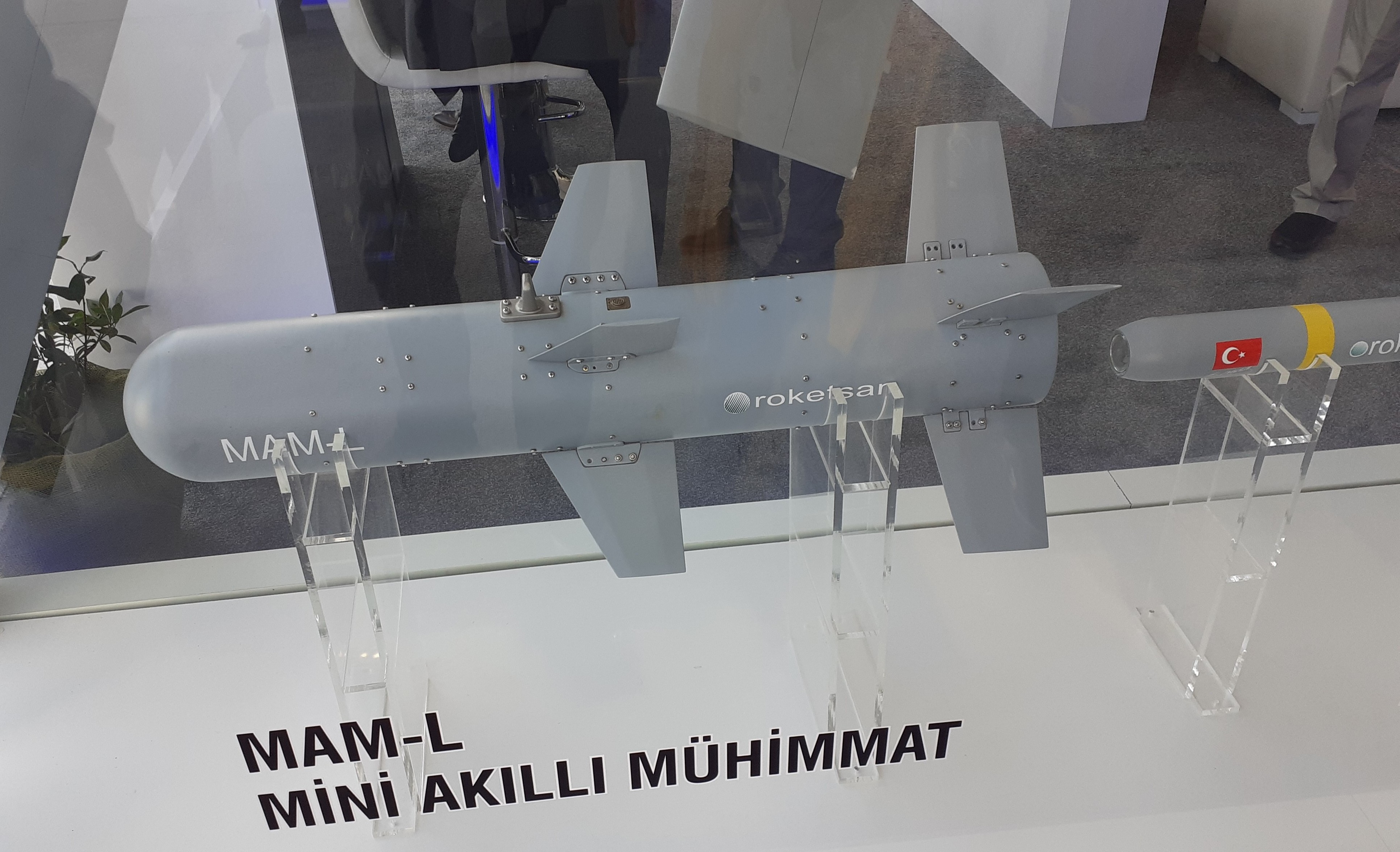
- The Smart Micro Munition (MAM-L) and behind it MAM-C high explosive variant
  Hardpoints: 6 hardpoints for laser-guided smart munition, with provisions to carry combinations of :
  - L-UMTAS (Long Range Anti tank Missile System)
  - MAM: MAM-C, MAM-L and MAM-T precision-guided munitions

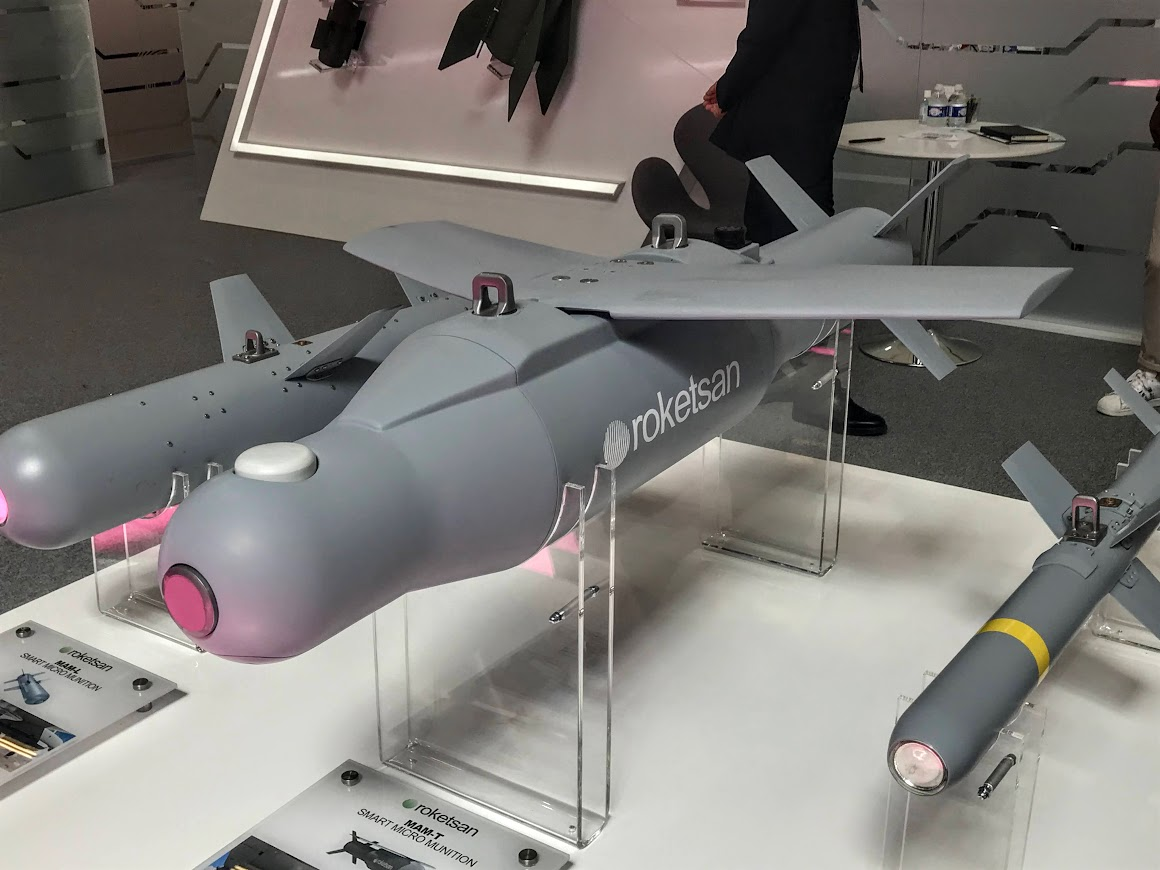
MAM-T Munition

  - Roketsan Cirit (70 mm Missile System)
  - TUBITAK-SAGE BOZOK Laser Guided Rockets
  - TUBITAK-SAGE TOGAN Air-to-surface launched 81 mm mortar munition
  - TUBITAK-SAGE KUZGUN Modular joint ammunition KUZGUN-TjM Turkish: TjM :Turbojet Motorlu Turbojet engine variant with range of 245 kilometers and KUZGUN-SS Turkish: SS: Serbest Süzülen Free Soaring variant range of 110 kilometers variants in use
  - Roketsan IHA-122. A supersonic missile with 50 km+ range. The first test was carried out successfully in March 2025.
  - Advanced Precision Kill Weapon System - 70mm laser-guided rocket (proposed)
- Loitering munition
  - KEMANKEŞ 1

=== Avionics ===
- Interchangeable Electro-optical reconnaissance, surveillance and targeting system or Multi Mode AESA Radar:
  - Aselsan ASELFLIR 500 (option 1)
  - Aselsan CATS (option 2)
- ASELSAN’s ANTIDOT pods including:
  - ANTIDOT 2-U/S 100 electronic support pod. This pod can detect, identify, and locate signals from enemy radars. The pod has a power consumption of 300 W, which can be satisfied by tactical UAVs and UCAVs.
  - ANTIDOT 2-U/EA 200 electronic warfare pod. This pod can suppress and deceive all radars of the air defense system with the electronic attack techniques loaded.

== See also ==
- List of unmanned aerial vehicles
- Measurement and signature intelligence
- Bayraktar UAV

Related development

- Baykar Bayraktar Mini UAV
- Baykar Bayraktar TB1
- Baykar Bayraktar TB2
- Baykar Bayraktar Akıncı
- Bayraktar Kızılelma

Aircraft of comparable role, configuration, and era

- TAI Anka
- TAI Aksungur
- General Atomics MQ-9 Reaper
- General Atomics Mojave
- BAE Systems Mantis
- IAI Eitan
- Vestel Karayel
- CAIG Wing Loong

Related lists

- List of active Turkish military aircraft
