= TAI Hürkuş =

Turkish turboprop trainer aircraft

Hürkuş

General information
- Type: Basic/advanced trainer aircraft; Light attack aircraft
- National origin: Turkey
- Manufacturer: Turkish Aerospace Industries
- Status: In service
- Primary user: Turkish Air Force

History
- First flight: Hürkuş-1: 29 August 2013; Hürkuş-2: 30 December 2024

The TAI Hürkuş (Turkish for "Free Bird") is a tandem two-seat, low-wing, single-engine, turboprop aircraft being produced by Turkish Aerospace Industries (TAI) as a trainer and ground attack aircraft for the Turkish Armed Forces.

The aircraft is named after Vecihi Hürkuş, a World War I and Turkish Independence War veteran pilot, a Turkish aviation pioneer and the first Turkish airplane manufacturer.

== Design and development ==
The TAI Hürkuş Development Program started with an agreement signed between Turkish Undersecretariat for Defense Industries (SSB) and TAI in March 2006. Under the agreement the company will design, manufacture and complete the civil certification the aircraft to European Aviation Safety Agency (EASA) CS 23 standards.

By June 2012 the Hürkuş program had consumed one million man-hours with the work of 140 engineers. About a quarter of the Turkish engineers who have worked on Hürkuş are female, as well as two of the three project heads.

The Hürkuş is equipped for day and night flying as well as basic pilot training, instrument flying, navigation training, weapons and formation training. The aircraft has good visibility from both cockpits with a 50 degree down-view angle from the rear cockpit, cabin pressurization (nominal 4.16 psid), Martin-Baker Mk T-16 N 0/0 ejection seats, an onboard oxygen generation system (OBOGS), an Environmental Control System (Vapor Cycle Cooling), an anti-G system, high shock absorbing landing gear for training missions, and Hands On Throttle and Stick (HOTAS). Microtecnica of Turin, Italy has been selected to provide the aircraft's environmental control system. The Hürkuş has been designed for a 35-year service life.

The Hürkuş development program has been subject to delays. In 2007 it was forecast that the first prototype would fly in late-2009 with first delivery, upon completion of the certification process, forecast for 2011. On 27 June 2012, the Hürkuş was officially rolled out at a ceremony held at TAI's Kazan premises. The forecast date for the first flight was then delayed until later in 2012 and actually occurred on 29 August 2013 when the aircraft flew from the Ankara Akıncı Air Base on a 33-minute flight.

In 2016, the Hürkuş-A trainer aircraft was awarded a CS-23 Validation Type Certificate by the European Aviation Safety Agency (EASA) and an Aircraft Type Certificate by the Turkish Directorate General of Civil Aviation (DGCA)

In February 2017, photos were released by the Turkish MoD, showing the Hürkuş-C prototype carrying Roketsan UMTAS anti-tank guided missiles, Roketsan Cirit laser-guided rockets, an electro-optical and infrared (EO/IR) pod (likely the Aselsan Common Aperture Targeting System or CATS), and external fuel tanks. On 7 April 2017, a Hürkuş-C fired a Roketsan L-UMTAS anti-tank missile that successfully hit the target on the ground.

TAI developed Hürkuş 2, which is a modified, lighter and improved version of Hürkuş aircraft. The first prototypes are on the assembly line and are expected to appear in 2025 and make their first flight. Turkish Aerospace announced that the Hürkuş-2 aircraft, had completed its first flight with 6,500 feet altitude, 140-knot speed, 20 minutes of flight time.. In September 2026, the Hürkuş 2 trainer aircraft was awarded a Military Type Certificate by the Defence Industry Agency (SSB). The Turkish Air Force (TurAF) received its first two Hurkus-II next-generation basic trainers on 28th September 2026.

15 Hürkuş 1B and 1C were delivered to Turkish Armed Forces but they were later redirected for export. 15 Hürkuş-II will be delivered in 2025, 20 in 2026 and 20 in 2027.

The Turkish government has indicated that the aircraft is expected to attract export sales, possibly from Middle Eastern countries, African countries or countries with limited air force budgets. According to a news report from CNN Türk, Australia and Sweden are interested in the aircraft.

== Variants ==
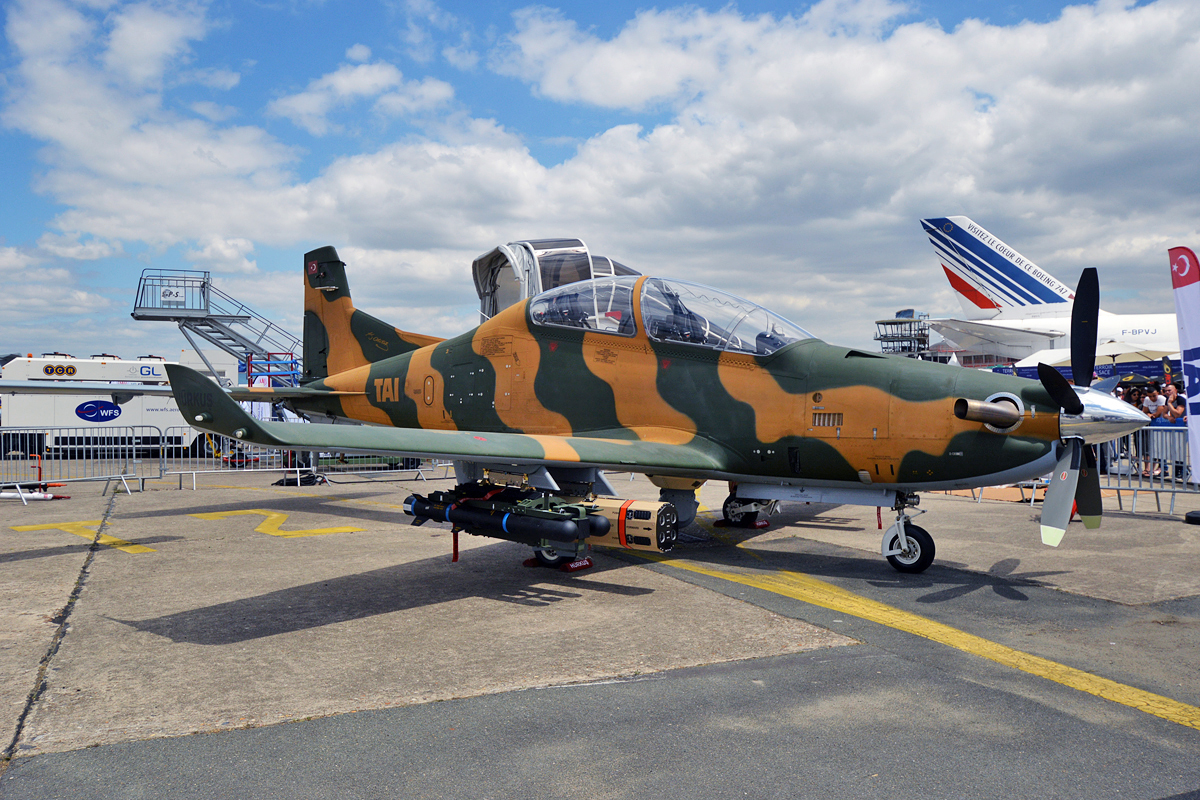
Hürkuş-C in the 2017 Paris Air Show

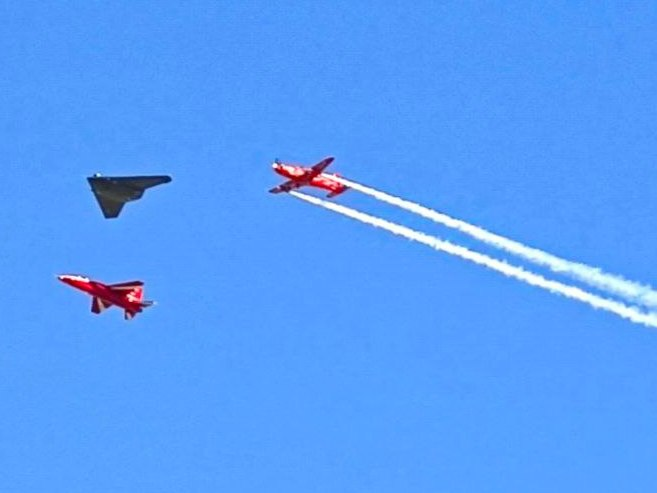
TAI Anka-3 (center) flying in formation with a TAI Hürjet (left) and a TAI Hürkuş (right) in 2024

=== Hürkuş-1A ===
Basic version which has been certified with EASA according to CS-23 requirements. It is intended for the civilian market.

=== Hürkuş-1B ===
Advanced military version with integrated avionics (including HUD, MFDs, and Mission Computer). Cockpit avionics layout is similar to F-16 fighters.

=== Hürkuş-1C ===
An armed version for the close air support role in addition to pilot training missions, a maximum weapons load of 3,300lb (1,500kg) and also carry a forward-looking infrared (FLIR) sensor. It is capable of operating from unprepared runways. The Turkish Army has expressed interest in using the aircraft in counter-terrorism environments and is expected to attract export orders. The main advantage is the lower cost of air power, especially in low-intensity combat theatres where anti-air warfare threats are minimal.

An unmanned prototype of the Hurkus-C "UAS" was developed. Also, a version of the Hürkuş to support the Turkish Coast Guard's maritime patrol operations was offered. The aircraft's rear seat was to be occupied by an operator for a FLIR sensor using an ASELSAN FLIR system.

=== Hürkuş-2 ===
Although the project is also called HÜRKUŞ-2, its official name is New Generation HÜRKUŞ-B. The key points are as follows.

Weight Reduction and Materials:

- Total reduction of about 450–500 kilograms compared to the previous version.
- Composite material usage was increased, and lighter metals and alloys were incorporated into various structural parts.
- Additional weight reduction was achieved by thinning metal components.

Performance Improvements:

- Improved overall performance, fuel efficiency.
- Heavier takeoff payload, operational capacity and air endurance.

Aerodynamic and Structural Design Changes:

- Nose and Engine Section
  - The spinner received a more aerodynamic design.
  - The engine air intake and exhaust outlets were redesigned.
  - The nose profile is now noticeably slimmer, improving aerodynamic efficiency.
- Landing Gear
  - The nose landing gear has been redesigned, contributing both to weight reduction and overall structural refinement.
- Canopy and Cockpit
  - The canopy and cockpit geometry have been modified, with the angle slightly reduced for better aerodynamics and visibility.
- Wings
  - The new winglets are smaller, improving aerodynamic stability and efficiency.
  - Wing–fuselage junctions also show refined integration for smoother airflow.
- Tail Section
  - The tail assembly underwent a visible redesign, with reduced weight and enhanced aerodynamic effectiveness.

Localization of Systems:

- The new model includes fully indigenously produced systems, such as the cooling system, hydraulic pump, radio communication system and IFF (Identification Friend or Foe) system.

== Operators ==
=== Current operators ===
Turkey

- Turkish Air Force – 55 Hürkuş-2 on order. 15 Hürkuş 1B and 1Cs were transferred for export. 4 Hürkuş-2 in service

Libya

- Libyan Air Force - 10 Hürkuş-C are to be delivered.

Niger

- Niger Air Force – 2 Hürkuş-B in service.

Chad

- Chadian Air Force - 3 Hürkuş-C in service.

=== Future operators ===
Turkey

- Turkish Land Forces - 24 Hürkuş-2 planned.
- Gendarmerie General Command - Planned acquisition of Hürkuş-2.

Azerbaijan

- Azerbaijani Air Forces - 14 Hürkuş-II on order.

== Specifications (Hürkuş-1) ==
Data from TAI and Airforce Technology

General characteristics

- Crew: one
- Capacity: one passenger
- Length: 11.17 m (36 ft 8 in)
- Wingspan: 9.96 m (32 ft 8 in)
- Height: 3.70 m (12 ft 2 in)
- Powerplant: 1 × Pratt & Whitney Canada PT6A-68T turboprop aircraft engine, 1,200 kW (1,600 shp)
- Propellers: 5-bladed Hartzell Propeller HC-B5MA-3

Performance

- Maximum speed: 574 km/h (357 mph, 310 kn)
- Cruise speed: 463 km/h (288 mph, 250 kn)
- Stall speed: 143 km/h (89 mph, 77 kn)
- Range: 1,478 km (918 mi, 798 nmi) at 15000 ft (4572 m)
- Endurance: 4.25 hours at 15000 ft (4572 m)
- Service ceiling: 10,577 m (34,701 ft)
- g limits: +7/-3.5
- Rate of climb: 22 m/s (3,000 ft/min)

Armament

- Guns: 12.7 mm gun pods, 20 mm cannon pods
- Rockets: Roketsan Cirit, 2.75-inch rockets
- Missiles: Roketsan UMTAS
- Bombs: Mk-81 with LGK-81, Mk-82, Tübitak SAGE HGK-3 (82), Tübitak SAGE KGK-82, BDU33, MK106 training ordnance, TUBITAK-SAGE TOGAN, TUBITAK-SAGE BOZOK and MAM (Smart Micro Munition)

Avionics

- Air data computer
- Attitude and heading reference system
- Emergency locator transmitter
- GPS
- Mode S transponder
- Radar altimeter

== See also ==
Aircraft of comparable role, configuration, and era

- Beechcraft T-6 Texan II
- Calidus B-250
- Embraer EMB 314 Super Tucano
- Fuji T-7
- Grob G 120TP
- HAL HTT-40
- KAI KT-1
- Pilatus PC-21
- PZL-130 Orlik
- UTVA Kobac
