= TAI Şimşek =

Turkish target drone

Şimşek / Süper Şimşek

General information
- Type: Unmanned target drone
- Manufacturer: Turkish Aerospace Industries (TAI)
- Primary user: Turkish Armed Forces

History
- First flight: August 4, 2012

TAI Şimşek is a turbojet-powered radio-controlled high-speed target drone designed, developed and built by Turkish Aerospace Industries (TAI) between 2009 and 2012 for the needs of the Turkish Armed Forces.

Şimşek is the Turkish word for "lightning".

== Overview ==
Development started in 2009, and a prototype was presented to the public at the International Defence Industry Fair the same year. The UAV made its maiden flight on August 4, 2012.

Şimşek simulates enemy aircraft and missiles for air-to-air, surface-to-air, anti-aircraft gunnery and missile systems’ tracking and firing training. It looks like tactical air-launched decoys (TALDs).

TAI intends to further develop the drone into a cruise missile with "Human-in-the-Loop" (HITL) guidance capability for use against mobile or fixed soft targets.

Payloads of TAI Şimşek consists of following features:

- Passive Radar Cross-Section Augmenter (Luneburg lens)
- Passive IR Signature
- Miss Distance Indicator (MDI)
- Counter-measures Dispensing System
- Tracking Smoke Generator

The drone is launched from a catapult and recovered by parachute. It can take off and can be controlled from navy vessels.

In July 2020 TAI launched Şimşek from TAI Anka integrated arm and made history by launching the target drone from UAV for the first time.

== Specifications ==
Data from Turkish Aerospace Industries TAI

General characteristics

Performance

- Maximum speed: 740 km/h (460 mph, 400 kn)
- Endurance: 60 min
- Service ceiling: 4,500 m (14,800 ft)

== Şimşek-K ==
Şimşek-K presents the next generation of Turkish aerial target drones. Introduces for the first time at the IDEF 2025 it has two goals, act as a fast-moving enemy aircraft for training and be used as a kamikaze (suicide) drone. On 22 August 2025, the Şimşek-K successfully completed its first rocket-assisted (RATO) ground launch and hit a ground target with a warhead.

=== Specifications ===
Specification	Value
Crew	Uncrewed
Length	2.4 m
Wingspan	1.5 m
Maximum take-off weight	83 kg
Payload capacity	Up to 18 kg
Maximum speed	Mach 0.63
Line-of-sight data link range	150 km
Operational range	Up to 500 km

== Süper Şimşek ==
Süper Şimşek is a Turkish high-subsonic tactical unmanned aerial vehicle (UAV) developed by Turkish Aerospace Industries. It is an advanced evolution of the earlier TAI Şimşek high-speed target drone, redeveloped into a multi-role, modular platform. Depending on configuration, it can perform air defence training target simulation, electronic warfare, radar jamming and deception, suppression of enemy air defenses (SEAD/DEAD), intelligence, surveillance and reconnaissance (ISR), and loitering munition strikes.

The system has a modular payload architecture and can be launched from ground-based rocket-assisted systems or air-launched from carrier platforms such as the ANKA, AKSUNGUR, and ANKA-3. It is designed for fully autonomous operation and supports AI-assisted swarm missions.

== Development ==
TAI launched the original Şimşek programme in the late 2000s to provide realistic high-speed aerial targets for Turkish Armed Forces training and weapons testing. The Süper Şimşek variant was developed as a larger and significantly more capable platform, featuring increased payload capacity, range, endurance, and mission flexibility for both training and combat roles.

The aircraft conducted its maiden flight in December 2023. In April 2025, it successfully completed air-launch tests from the ANKA-3 stealth unmanned combat aircraft as part of the Autonomous Loyal Wingman (OKU) concept. It has also been integrated with the AKSUNGUR platform. The system entered limited service with the Turkish Air Force in early 2026.

== Design ==
Süper Şimşek features a modular airframe that allows rapid reconfiguration for different mission profiles. It supports both ground-based rocket-assisted launch and air-launch from carrier aircraft. Recovery is performed via a parachute system.

Depending on payload configuration, the UAV can perform the following missions:

- Realistic target simulation and radar/infrared signature augmentation for air defence training and weapons testing
- Electronic warfare, including radar jamming and deployment of expendable countermeasures (chaff and flares)
- Suppression and deception of enemy air defences (SEAD/DEAD)
- Intelligence, surveillance and reconnaissance (ISR) with Electro-optical sensor/infrared sensors
- Loitering strike missions using an integrated warhead
- AI-assisted coordinated swarm operations

== Specifications ==
Specification	Value
Crew	Uncrewed
Length	4 m
Wingspan	1.75 m
Height	0.75 m
Maximum take-off weight	200 kg
Payload capacity	Up to 50 kg
Powerplant	1 × turbojet engine
Maximum speed	Mach 0.85
Service ceiling	35,000 ft (10,700 m)
Endurance	Approximately 80 minutes
Line-of-sight data link range	150 km
Operational range	Up to 900 km (air-launched)
Launch methods	Ground rocket-assisted or air-launched
Recovery	Parachute recovery system

Payload options include radar cross-section and infrared signature augmentation devices, electronic jammers, miss-distance indicators, chaff/flare dispensers, electro-optical/infrared sensors, and integrated warheads.
