= TAI Anka-3 =

Turkish Stealth UAV

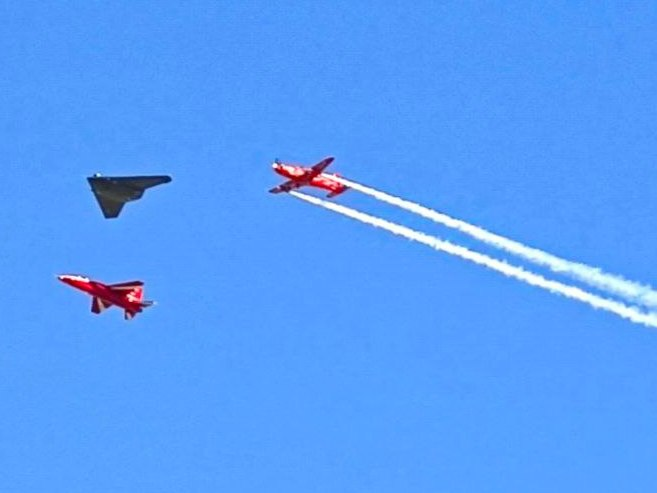
- TAI Anka-3 (center) flying in formation with a TAI Hürjet (left) and a TAI Hürkuş (right) in 2024

General information
- Type: Jet-powered stealth unmanned combat aerial vehicle; Artificial intelligence based autonomous aircraft; Loyal wingman drone
- National origin: Turkey
- Manufacturer: Turkish Aerospace Industries
- Status: Prototype flight testing
- Number built: 2 prototypes

History
- Introduction date: 2026 / 2027 (expected)
- First flight: 28 December 2023

The TAI Anka-3 is a flying wing type autonomous, stealth, carrier-capable multirole unmanned combat aerial vehicle (UCAV) with AI-enabled systems and loyal wingman capability, currently in development by Turkish Aerospace Industries. Its first version is primarily designed to attack ground and sea targets but can also carry air-to-air missiles. It is one of two Turkish jet-powered stealth UCAVs developed along with the Bayraktar Kızılelma. The Anka-3 is equipped with a suite of advanced operational capabilities. Key among these features is manned-unmanned teaming, allowing it to coordinate effectively with piloted aircraft. The platform also leverages swarm technologies integrated with artificial intelligence (AI). Additionally, the aircraft is also equipped for electronic warfare (EW), signals intelligence (SIGINT) and deep strike missions. The aircraft uses common avionics architecture and ground segment with TAI Anka and TAI Aksungur.

== Development ==
The runway tests of the Anka-3 began in April 2023. Its maiden flight took place on 28 December 2023. The UCAV was airborne for one hour and ten minutes. On 20 August 2024, the Anka-3 successfully performed its first in-flight landing gear retraction test, marking another significant milestone in its development.

On 20 September 2024, the Anka-3 successfully completed its first live-fire test, striking its target with precision. This test, conducted with the collaboration of Aselsan and Roketsan, represents a milestone for Türkiye’s rapidly advancing defense industry. The live-fire test was carried out using the AF500 electro-optic camera system, produced by Aselsan, and the Teber-82 guidance kit, developed by Roketsan.

On 30 October 2024, a TAI Anka-3 UCAV armed with a cruise missile became the first drone in history to be controlled by another aircraft in the loyal wingman role, representing an advancement in remote control capabilities for military aviation.

On 13 January 2025, a TAI Anka-3 successfully completed a strike mission test with internal munitions such as the Tolun bomb.

On 25 June 2025, a TAI Anka-3 prototype crashed during a test flight conducted as part of the Anatolian Eagle 2025 international exercise.

== Design ==
=== Propulsion and performance ===
Initially powered by a single engine, TAI plans to equip the Anka-3 with two TEI-TF10000 turbofan engines. These domestically developed engines are expected to provide the UCAV with supersonic capabilities, allowing it to accompany the crewed KAAN combat aircraft.

=== Operational capabilities ===
Designed for high-speed operations, the Anka-3 offers both air-to-ground and air-to-air capabilities. Its low radar signature enhances survivability, while its endurance of up to 10 hours and high altitude capabilities enable long-range missions. The UCAV can operate autonomously with line-of-sight and beyond-line-of-sight control.

Beyond its combat role, the Anka-3 can perform intelligence, surveillance, and reconnaissance (ISR) missions, as well as electronic warfare. Future variants may be larger with increased payload capacity, further expanding its capabilities.

=== Integration and future prospects ===
The Anka-3 is part of a broader Turkish drone ecosystem, including the Şimşek and Süper Şimşek drones. These unmanned systems work together to provide a comprehensive aerial capability.

Production of the Anka-3 is underway, with plans to deliver multiple units by 2028. The development of the Anka-3 and its associated technologies reflects Turkey's aim to reduce reliance on foreign military equipment and establish a domestic defense industry.

The Anka-3's emergence is part of a global trend towards integrating unmanned systems into military operations. Its capabilities and the broader Turkish drone program have attracted international attention, with countries like Indonesia expressing interest in acquiring similar systems.

== Operators ==
- Turkey:
  - Turkish Armed Forces: 80 on order.

== Specifications (prototype) ==
The aircraft is now in the prototype stage. The technical specification of the production version could be different.

Data from Turkish Aerospace Industries, Jane's, TRT Haber, Turkish Minute

General characteristics

- Capacity: 1,700 kg (3,700 lb)
- Length: 8.9 m (29 ft 2 in)
- Wingspan: 13.1 m (43 ft 0 in)
- Height: 2.6 m (8 ft 6 in)
- Max takeoff weight: 7,250 kg (15,984 lb)
- Powerplant: 1 × Ivchenko-Progress AI-322 Turbofan engine

Performance

- Maximum speed: 787 km/h (489 mph, 425 kn) 0.7 Mach
- Cruise speed: 460 km/h (290 mph, 250 kn) 0.42 Mach
- Combat range: 1,075 km (668 mi, 580 nmi) air-to-air or air-to-ground configuration
- Endurance: 10 hours
- Service ceiling: 12,000 m (40,000 ft)
- Operational altitude: 7,600 m (25,000 ft)

Armament

- Hardpoints: 2 × internal stations (can carry up to eight munitions within its internal weapons bay), 5 × external stations on wings.
- Missiles
  - Air-to-surface missiles
    - SOM-J air-launched cruise missile (The missile has land attack and anti-ship capability)
  - Air-to-air missiles
    - Imaging infrared (IIR) guided air to air missile
    - Radar-guided air-to-air missile
- TUAV
  - Süper Şimşek
- Bombs
  - TOLUN guided glide bombs (The bomb has bunker buster capability. It is equipped with INS / GPS guidance.)
  - Teber-82 (Mark 82 bomb equipped with Roketsan guidance kit. The kit is equipped with INS, GPS and a Semi-active laser seeker.)
  - Mark 82 bomb , with provisions to carry combinations of:
  - Other:
    - External drop tank

Avionics

- Aselsan MURAD 100-A AESA radar
- Electro-optical reconnaissance, surveillance and targeting system:
  - Aselsan TOYGUN
  - Aselsan ASELFLIR600
- IR Search and Track System KARAT IRST
- Electronic warfare: Electronic warfare support measures (ESM) and Electronic attack (EA) equipments
- Signals intelligence: Communications intelligence (COMINT) and Electronic intelligence (ELINT) equipments

== See also ==
Aircraft of comparable role, configuration and era

- Baykar Bayraktar Kızılelma
- Sukhoi S-70 Okhotnik-B
- DRDO Ghatak
