= TEI-PD170 =

Turbodiesel aviation engine developed by Tusaş Engine Industries

- TEI-PD170 turbodiesel aviation engine
- Type: Turbodiesel
- National origin: Turkey
- Manufacturer: Tusaş Engine Industries (TEI)
- First run: 22 December 2016
- Major applications: Bayraktar TB2; Bayraktar TB3; TAI Anka; TAI Aksungur
- Number built: Over 100
- Developed into: TEI-PD222ST

The TEI-PD170 is an advanced turbodiesel aviation engine developed by Tusaş Engine Industries (TEI). It was designed for use in Turkish unmanned aerial vehicles (UAVs) and serves as a core part of Turkey's indigenous aerospace engine initiatives. The engine delivers a maximum power of 170 hp (127 kW) and is optimized for high altitude and endurance performance.

== Design and development ==
The TEI-PD170 program began in response to Turkey's need for a domestically produced engine for its UAV platforms, reducing reliance on foreign suppliers. It first ran on 22 December 2016, and achieved certification in 2018. The engine is notable for its fuel efficiency, high-altitude capability, and modular design, making it ideal for long-endurance missions.

The engine has been integrated into platforms such as the Bayraktar TB2, Bayraktar TB3, TAI Anka and the TAI Aksungur, contributing significantly to the operational effectiveness of Turkey's UAV fleet. A higher-powered variant, the TEI-PD222ST, is under development to meet increasing performance requirements.

== Variants ==
TEI-PD170
Base version with a 170 hp (127 kW) output, designed for use in Turkish UAVs like the Bayraktar TB2, Bayraktar TB3, TAI Anka and TAI Aksungur.
TEI-PD180ST
Enhanced version with a power output of 180 hp (134 kW). Designed for higher endurance and greater reliability in harsh operational environments. The TEI-PD180ST is an upgrade aimed at providing additional thrust for larger UAV platforms.
TEI-PD222ST
More powerful successor with a 222 hp (165 kW) output, designed to meet increasing operational demands of UAV platforms. It offers improved fuel efficiency and enhanced operational capability, supporting higher payloads and extended flight durations.

== Specifications (TEI-PD170) ==
Data from

=== General characteristics ===
- Type: Four-cylinder, in-line, four-stroke, turbocharged diesel aircraft engine
- Displacement: 2,100 cc (128.1 cu in)
- Length: 850 mm (33 in)
- Width: 950 mm (37 in)
- Height: 930 mm (37 in)
- Dry weight: 210 kg (463 lb) (dry)
- Designer: Tusaş Engine Industries (TEI)
- Mean Time Between Failures (MTBF): > 1000 hours

=== Components ===
- Valvetrain: Overhead camshaft, DOHC
- Supercharger: No
- Turbocharger: Yes
- Fuel system: Direct injection
- Fuel type: Jet-A1 or Diesel (EN 590)
- Oil system: Closed-loop
- Cooling system: Liquid-cooled
- Reduction gear: Reduction gearbox with 1:1.5 ratio

=== Performance ===
- Power output: 170 hp (127 kW) at 2,200 rpm
- Specific power: 0.10 hp/cu in (4.55 kW/L)
- Compression ratio: 16:1
- Fuel consumption: 25 L/h (6.60 US gal/h) at maximum power
- Specific fuel consumption: 12.8 L/h (3.38 US gal/h) at 70% power
- Power-to-weight ratio: 0.81 hp/kg (0.60 kW/kg)
- Maximum torque: 400 N⋅m (295.0 lbf⋅ft) (at max RPM)

== Applications ==
- Bayraktar TB2
- Bayraktar TB3
- TAI Anka
- TAI Aksungur

== See also ==
Comparable engines

- Continental CD-230
- Rotax 912
- Rotax 915iS

Related lists

- List of aircraft engines
