= Mini Akıllı Mühimmat =

Laser-guided munitions from Roketsan

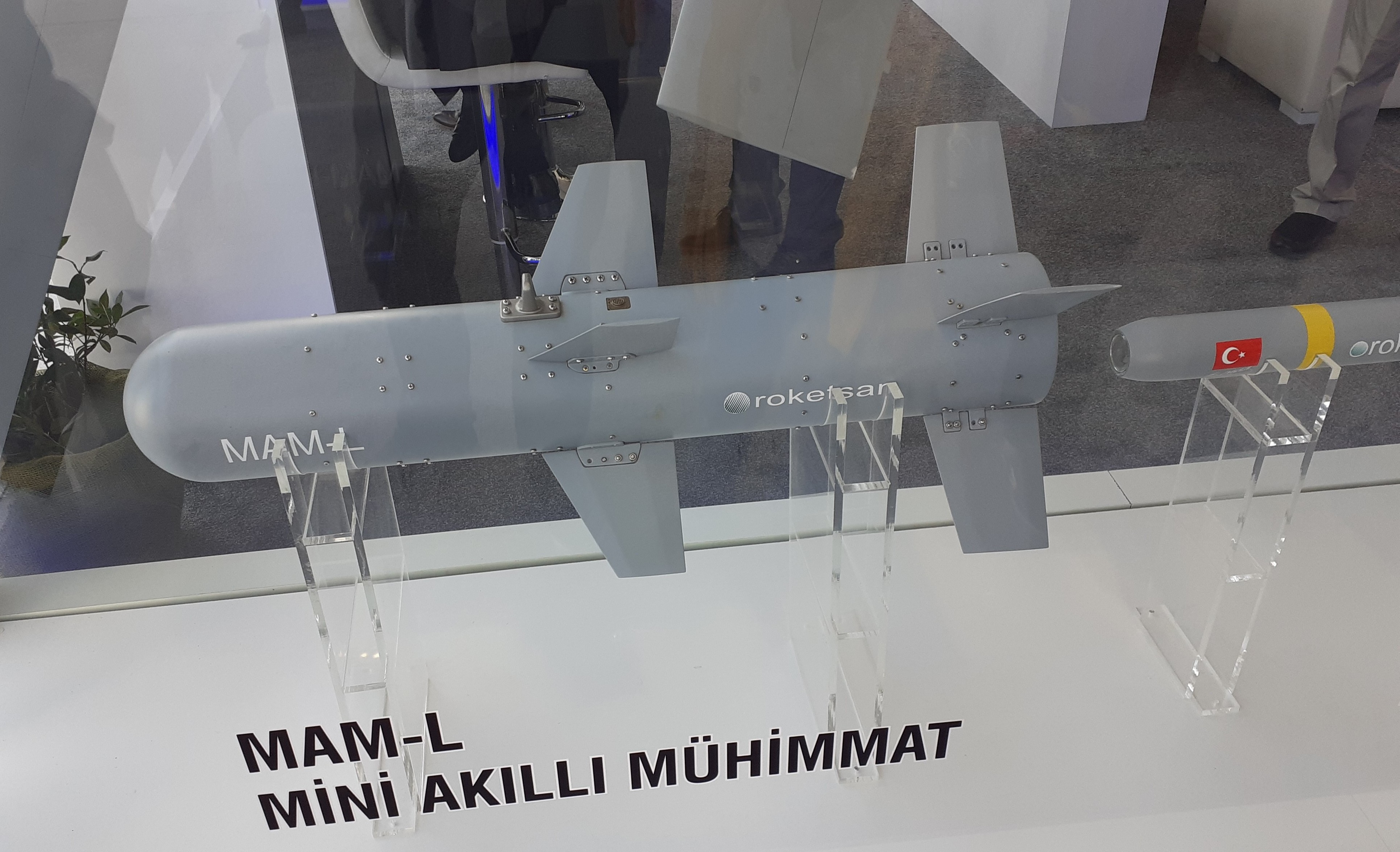
- MAM-L (left) and MAM-C (right)
- Type: Laser-guided bomb
- Place of origin: Turkey

Service history
- Used by: See Users
- Wars: PKK conflict Syrian civil war Libyan civil war (2014–2020); Second Nagorno-Karabakh War; Russian invasion of Ukraine; Tigray War; Mali War

Production history
- Designer: Roketsan
- Manufacturer: Roketsan
- Variants: See Variants

Specifications
- Operational range: MAM-C: 8 km MAM-L: 15 km MAM-T: 30 km to 80 km
- Launch platform: Baykar Bayraktar TB2; Baykar Bayraktar TB3; Baykar Bayraktar Akıncı; TAI Anka; TAI Aksungur; Vestel Karayel; TAI Hürkuş

Mini Akıllı Mühimmat (MAM), meaning "smart micro munition" is a family of laser-guided and/or GPS/INS guided bombs produced by Turkish defence industry manufacturer Roketsan.

MAM has been developed for unmanned aerial vehicles (UAV), light attack aircraft, fighter aircraft and air–ground missions for low-payload-capacity air platforms. MAM can engage both stationary and moving targets with high precision.

== Combat use ==
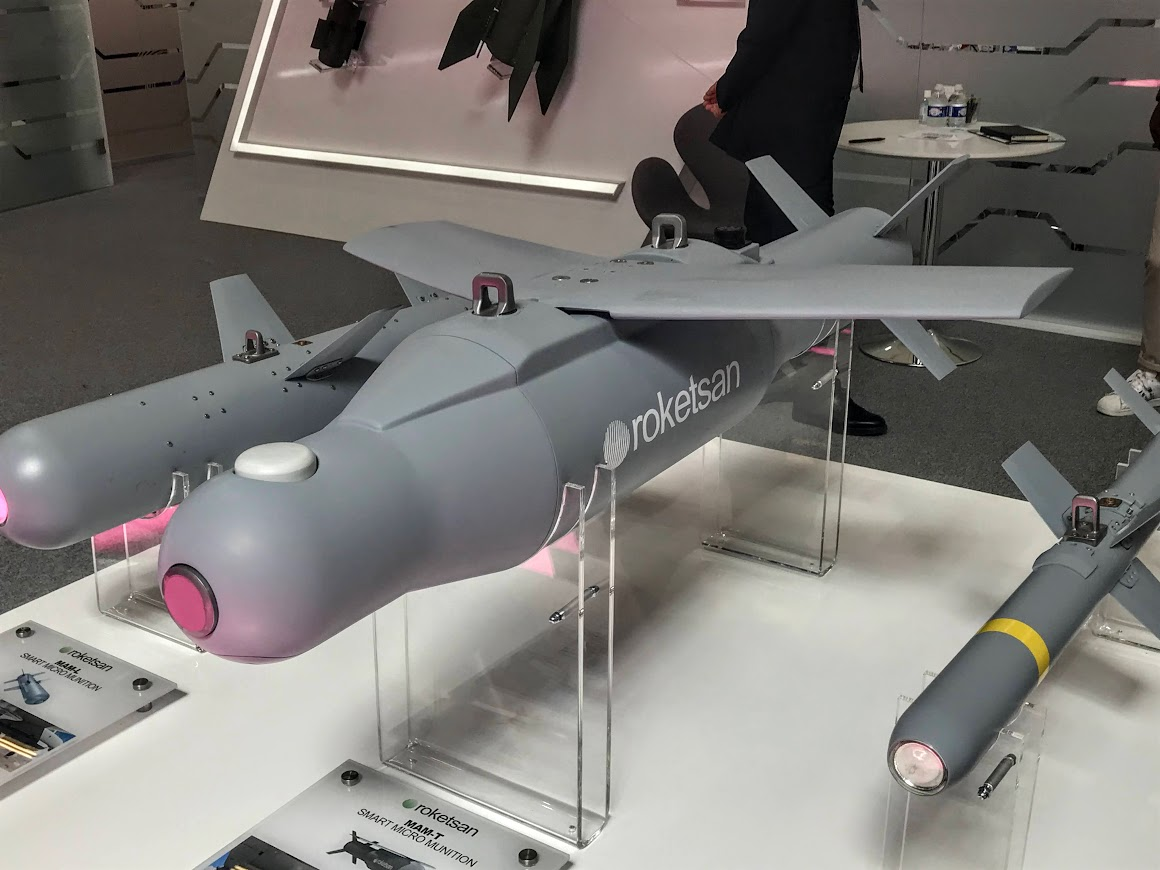
MAM-T Munition

- Operation Euphrates Shield
- Operation Olive Branch
- Operation Spring Shield
- Operation Claw
- 2019 Turkish offensive into north-eastern Syria
- Second Nagorno-Karabakh War
- Central Libya offensive
- Russian invasion of Ukraine
- Tigray War
- Mali War

== Technical specifications ==
	MAM-C	MAM-L	MAM-T
Diameter	70 mm (2.8 in)	160 mm (6.3 in)	230 mm (9.1 in)
Length	970 mm (3 ft 2 in)	1 m (3 ft 3 in)	1.4 m (4 ft 7 in)
Weight	6.5 kg	22 kg	94 kg
Range	8 km	15 km	30+ km (UCAV); 60+ km (light attack aircraft); 80+ km (fighter aircraft)
Seeker	Semi-active laser	Semi-active laser	Semi-active laser GPS/INS
Warhead types	Multi-purpose warhead (blast fragmentation, incendiary, & armor piercing); High-explosive blast fragmentation	Tandem – effective against reactive armor; High-explosive blast fragmentation; Thermobaric	High-explosive blast fragmentation
Fuse		Impact; Proximity	
Platforms	Unmanned aerial vehicles and light attack aircraft	Unmanned aerial vehicles and light attack aircraft	Unmanned aerial vehicles, light attack aircraft and fighter aircraft
Based on	Roketsan Cirit	Roketsan L-UMTAS	Roketsan TRG-230
Manufacturer	Roketsan	Roketsan	Roketsan

- MAM-L IIR features an imaging infrared seeker instead of an SAL seeker, an RF datalink, extended operational range in excess of 25 km, and slightly increased weight of 23 kg while retaining the baseline model's external appearance and warheads.
- MAM-T IIR features similar seeker changes with an improved mid-body wing kit, increased weight of 100 kg, a stated maximum range in excess of 50 km.

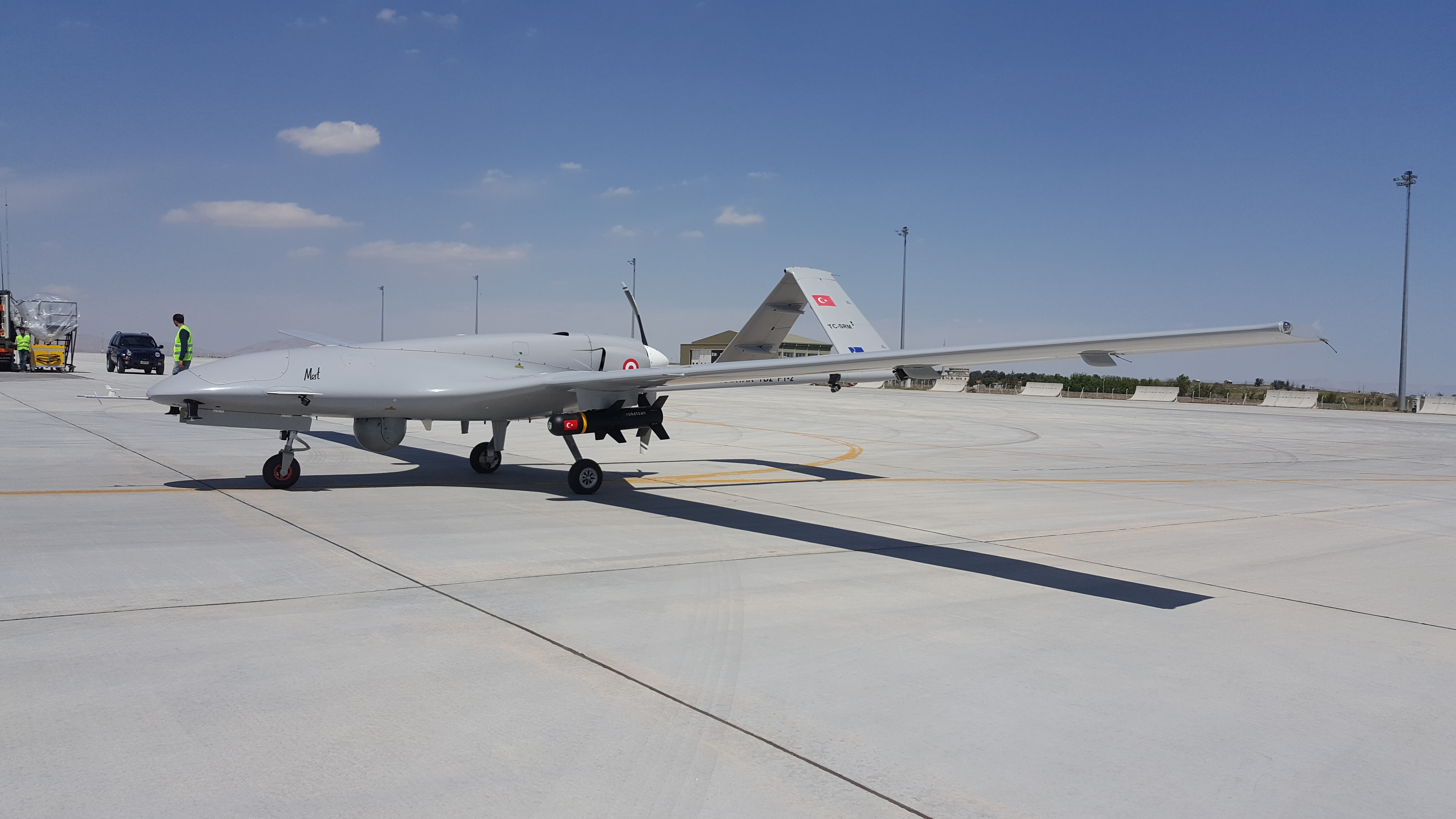
Bayraktar TB2 loaded with MAM-L

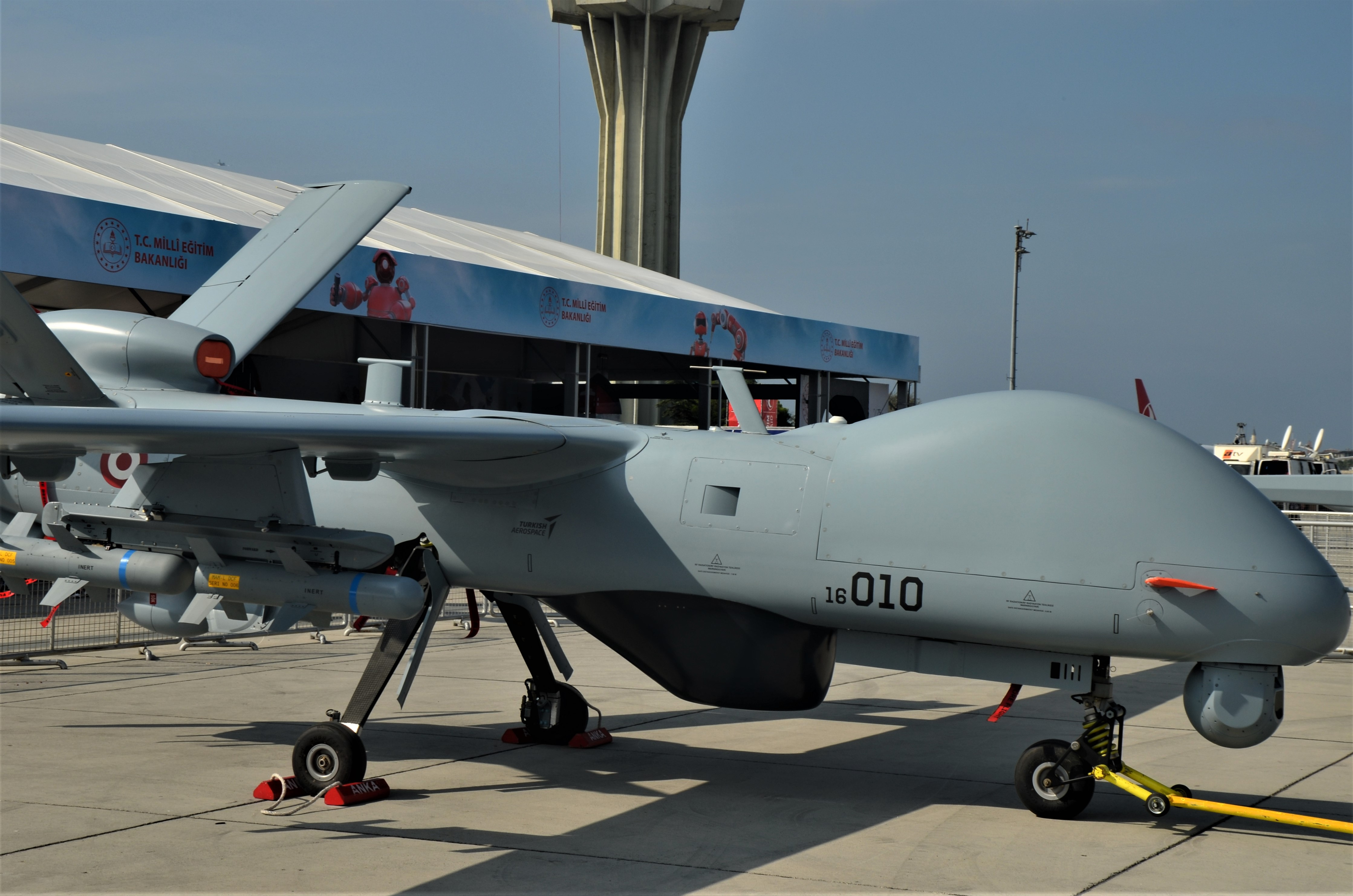
TAI Anka loaded with MAM-L

- There is also a new variant of MAM-L developed by Roketsan. NEŞTER is a new variant of the MAM-L, designed for ultra precise, low collateral strikes.

Key features: - Proximity sensor that activates just before impact - Unique warhead with deployable cutting blades - No explosive payload — minimizing collateral damage.

Built for surgical, point target elimination instead of wide area destruction, ideal for sensitive, high value targets.

== Users ==
Users of Roketsan MAM (Mali is included)

- Albania
- Azerbaijan
- Bangladesh: Bangladesh Army
- Croatia: Croatian Air Force
- Kuwait
- Libya: Government of National Accord
- Morocco
- Mali
- Pakistan
- Poland
- Qatar
- Saudi Arabia
- Tunisia
- Turkey
- Ukraine

== Mountable vehicles ==
- Bayraktar Akıncı
- Bayraktar TB2
- TAI Aksungur
- TAI Anka
- TAI Hürkuş (basic trainer and ground attack aircraft for the Turkish Armed Forces)
- Vestel Karayel

== See also ==
- Aselsan
- Baykar
- Desert Sting – (United Arab Emirates, South Africa)
- ULPGM
- Roketsan Cirit – (Turkey)
- Scientific and Technological Research Council of Turkey
- Turkish Aerospace Industries
