= Satcom on the Move =

Communication technology

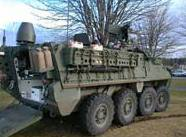

Satcom on the Move (SOTM), or satellite communications on the move, is a phrase used in the context of mobile satellite technology, specifically relating to military ground vehicles, Maritime and Airborne platforms. The basic principle behind Satcom On The Move is that a vehicle equipped with a satellite antenna is able to establish communication with a satellite and maintain that communication while the vehicle is moving.

Modern Military Operations often employ commercial satellites to fulfill theater capacity requirements. However, as modern military warfare is highly asymmetric and mobile, military units desire a SATCOM-on-the-move system. Currently, military units procure this capability from SOTM vendors such as INSTER Get SAT, EM Solutions, Alico Systems, Boeing, Gilat Satellite Networks, ND SATCOM , Comtech Mobile, Datapath, ReQuTech , General Dynamics SATCOM Technologies, iDirect, Inmarsat (BGAN), L3, Raytheon, Exelis, Step Electronics Australia or ViaSat. More recently Spectra Group (UK) Ltd has introduced SlingShot - a lightweight unit that converts existing tactical radios to SATCOM frequencies, offering a straightforward and cost-effective way to achieve tactical, secure, satcom on the move for those using UHF and VHF radios Comparison between these systems is difficult due to the differences between the technologies and service offerings. Military procurements might benefit from a common set of system requirements from which to evaluate different systems and product offerings. This article presents a survey of the SOTM market, product offerings, and technologies. It concludes with a summary of system technical requirements and drivers for the operation of MILSATCOM-on-the-Move over commercial satellite systems.

SATCOM on the move (otm) is currently fielded-Ka band-via the WIN-T program. This WIN-T (General Dynamics/BAE developed system) solution is by means of open loop tracking using an Internal Navigation System (INS). A better solution is closed loop tracking using a phased array antenna. Two Israeli companies have such systems. For example, GetSat has many arrays for Ka/Ku bands SATCOM otm. One of the issues with an open loop solution is the point accuracy obtained. Both the Army WIN-T and the Marines need to rethink SATCOM otm solutions. MIL-STD-188-164 provides some guidance.

One of the problems is SATCOM is not that secure. For example, both China and Russia have or will have capability to take out American or European satellites in case of war. HF radios can provide beyond line sight capability. The Marines recognized this; this might have affected their thinking about a mobile command center using SATCOM otm. Note the Marines fielded a static command center which is basically limited by line sight radios. This Marine Corps UOC/COC takes several hours to tear down and setup.

== History ==
In recent years, the United States military has expressed high levels of interest in Satcom On The Move technology, driven by former Secretary of Defense Donald Rumsfeld's call for lighter-weight, more mobile ground forces. This has pushed the commercial satellite industry to create communications satellite systems that support this need.
