= Çavuş =

Turkish title

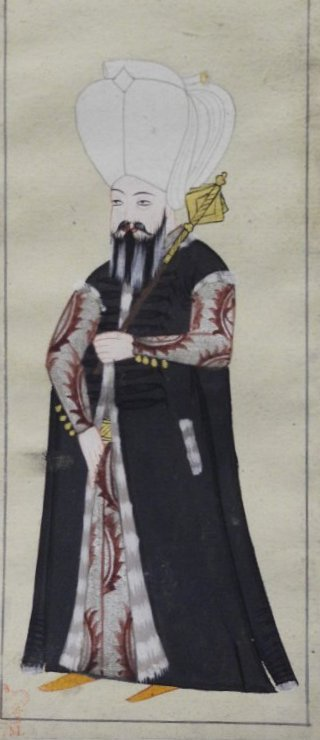
Çavuş

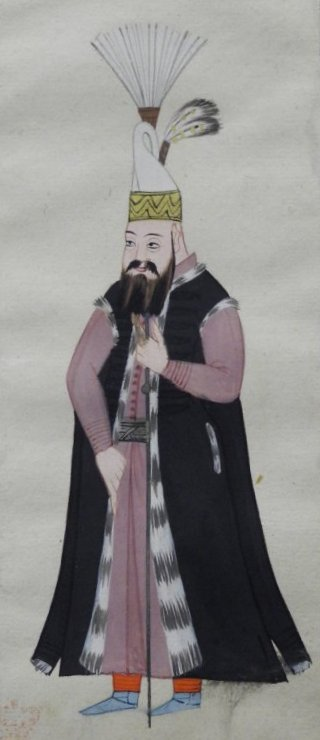
Çavuşbaşı

Illustrations from Peter Mundy's A briefe relation of the Turckes, their kings, Emperors, or Grandsigneurs, their conquests, religion, customes, habbits, etc (1618)

Çavuş, also anglicized Chaush and Chiaus (from Turkish: çavuş / چاوش; Arabic: شاويش, romanized: shawish; from Old Turkic Çabuş or Çawuş, "person who gives an order or yells") was an Ottoman title used for two separate soldier professions, both acting as messengers although differing in levels. It was a rank below agha and kethüda (from Persian, kad-khuda, "magistrate"), in units such as the Janissaries and Sipahi, and was also a term for members of the specialized unit of çavuşān (چاوشان, also çavuşiyye, çavuş(an)-i divan(i)) consisting of combined cavalry and infantry serving the Imperial Council (as in Ottoman Egypt). The leaders of the council's çavuş were titled çavuşbaşı / چاوش باشی (or başçavuş / باش چاوش). The çavuşbaşı was an assistant (or deputy) to the Grand Vizier, dealing with security matters, accompanying ambassadors visiting the Grand Vizier, and also carried out the first examination of petitions submitted to the council, and led council meetings when the Grand Vizier was not present. The title has its origin in Uyghur use, where it was the title of ambassadors, and then entered Seljuk usage for Byzantine imperial messengers, and Persian and Arabic usage for various court attendants.

The word gave rise to surnames, such as Çavuş (Turkish), Çavuşoğlu (Turkish), Čaušević (Serbo-Croatian), Čaušić (Serbo-Croatian), Baščaušević (Serbo-Croatian), Çaushaj (Albanian), Ceaușu (Romanian), Ceaușescu (Romanian), Τσαούσης (Tsaousis in Greek), and others. It is also the stem of place names, such as Çavuş (in Turkey), Çavuşlu (in Turkey), Çavuşlar (in Turkey), Çavuşköy (in Turkey), Çavuşbayırı (in Turkey), Čauševac (in Bosnia), Čauševići (one village in Bosnia and one village in Serbia), Čaušev Do (in Bosnia), Čauševina (in Bosnia), Čaušlije (in Bosnia), Čaušlija (in Macedonia), Chavusy (in Belarus), Çaushi (in Albania), and others. In the past in former Yugoslavia, the word čauš was also sometimes applied to the wedding-planner.

== List of çavuşbaşı ==
- Daut Bey (fl. 1484), served Sultan Bayezid II (r. 1481–1512)
- Kuyumcu Süleyman Agha, served Grand Vizier Ipşir Pasha (1653–54)
- Mehmed Raşid, served Sultan Mahmud II (r. 1808–1839)
- Mustafa Agha
- Ahmed Agha
- Selim Pasha
- Zulfiqar Agha
- Mohammed Haji-Ajvazade
- Abdul Kerim Izet

== Modern Turkish military usage ==
Çavuş
- Çavuş insignia

- Uzman [specialist] çavuş insignia
- Country: Turkey
- Service branch: Turkish Land Forces; Turkish Navy; Turkish Air Force
- NATO rank code: OR-4
- Next higher rank: Astsubay astçavuş
- Next lower rank: Onbaşı

In the modern Turkish Armed Forces, the rank of Çavuş is roughly equivalent of "corporal" and ranks above the rank of Onbaşı ("private first class").

Çavuş also serves as the root word for the rest of the non-commissioned officer rank names.

== See also ==
- Military ranks of Turkey
- Tzaousios, Byzantine title
- Chaush (India), Muslim community

== Sources ==
- Başaran, Betül (2014). Selim III, Social Control and Policing in Istanbul at the End of the Eighteenth Century: Between Crisis and Order. BRILL. pp. 186–. ISBN 978-90-04-27455-6.
- Holt, P. M. (2013). Studies in the History of the Near East. Routledge. pp. 238–. ISBN 978-1-136-27331-5.
- Šimunović, Petar (1995). Hrvatska prezimena: podrijetlo, značenje, rasprostranjenost. Golden Marketing. p. 10. ISBN 978-953-6168-16-3.
- Stein, Mark L. (2007). Guarding the Frontier: Ottoman Border Forts and Garrisons in Europe. I.B.Tauris. pp. 84–. ISBN 978-0-85771-313-1.
- Ujević, Mate (1942). Hrvatska enciklopedija. Vol. 4. Konzorcija Hrvatske enciklopedije. p. 207.
- Wilkins, Charles L. (2010). Forging Urban Solidarities: Ottoman Aleppo 1640-1700. BRILL. pp. 122–. ISBN 978-90-04-16907-4.
- Rječnik hrvatskoga ili srpskoga jezika. U knížarnici L. Hartmana na prodaju. 1882. p. 916.
