= Hava SOJ =

Turkish electronic warfare aircraft

Hava SOJ - ASOJ 23-A

General information
- Type: Electronic warfare aircraft
- National origin: Turkey
- Manufacturer: Bombardier Global 6000 (airframe modified by TUSAŞ) Aselsan (mission systems)
- Primary user: Turkish Air Force; Pakistan Air Force
- Number built: 4 planned

History
- Introduction date: 2026
- Developed from: Bombardier Global 6000

Hava SOJ (standoff jammer) or ASOJ 23-A, is a Turkish electronic warfare jet. It is a conversion of the Bombardier Global 6000 business jet. It was planned to put into service in late 2026 or 2027, but the first public video of it became available on the 115th anniversary of the Turkish Air Force ahead of deployment.

== Description ==
The plane features radar and communications jamming equipment, as well as signals intelligence for assessing the effectiveness of jamming.

The modification of the plane was carried out by Turkish Aerospace Industries, while the electronic warfare equipment was provided by Aselsan.

Comparable aircraft include USAF EA-37B Compass Call, Australian MC-55A Peregrine, and French Falcon Archange.

HAVA SOJ is designed to provide stand-off jamming and electronic attack capabilities against enemy radar and command-and-control systems. It was developer within the Turkish airborne electronic warfare programme, a joint effort between Turkish Aerospace Industries (TUSAŞ) and Aselsan. TUSAŞ is responsible for aircraft modification and certification, while Aselsan develops the electronic warfare suite, which includes wideband receivers, digital radio frequency memory (DRFM) jammers, and signal processing systems. A total of 4 aircraft are planned. The first aircraft was scheduled for delivery in 2026, with final delivery expected in 2028. In addition to its primary electronic attack role, the system is planned to have signals intelligence (SIGINT) and electronic intelligence (ELINT) capabilities. The aircraft is capable of operating at altitudes of up to approximately 51,000 feet (15,500 m).

A publicly confirmed self-protection system carried by the Hava SOJ aircraft is Leonardo's Miysis Directed Infrared Countermeasures (DIRCM) system.

== Operators ==
=== Current operators ===
- Turkey (1 in service and 3 in production)
- Pakistan (1 in service)
