= Čaušević =

Čaušević (Bosnian pronunciation: [tʃâuːʃeʋitɕ]) is a common family name found in Bosnia and Herzegovina and neighbouring countries. It stems from the root çavuş, which was a term for military officers in the early Ottoman period, and a Slavic patronymic suffix -ević. It is the third most frequent surname in Bosnia and Herzegovina, ranked behind Hodžić and Hadžić. Its bearers are predominantly Bosnian Muslims. Some of the lines descended from this family, separated in different areas of Bosnia and Herzegovina. The North-West of Bosnia and Herzegovina Kozarska Dubica. The east of Bosnia and Herzegovina Jahorina. Jablanica.

It may refer to:

- Adnan Čaušević (b. 1990), Bosnian footballer
- Džemaludin Čaušević (1870–1938), Bosnian Muslim imam
- Ena Sandra Causevic (b. 1989), Danish model
- Sead Čaušević (b. 1949), Bosnian politician

== See also ==
- Chaush
- Čaušić
- Čauševići
