= Turkish Air Force =

Air forces of the Turkish military

- Türk Hava Kuvvetleri
- Emblem of the Turkish Air Force
- Founded: 1 June 1911; (115 years, 5 months) (Note: (as the Ottoman Empire Aviation Squadrons)); 23 April 1920 (Turkish Air Force); 31 January 1944 (Turkish Air Force Command, corps scale); 1 July 1949 (Turkish Air Force Command, army scale)
- Country: Turkey
- Type: Air force Space force
- Role: Aerial warfare Space warfare
- Size: 50,000 personnel (2024); 294 aircraft 3 satellites
- Part of: TAF
- Headquarters: Çankaya, Ankara
- Colours: Grey; White; Delft blue
- March: Turkish Air Force March
- Mascot: Eagle (Note: The Eagle (Double-headed eagle), which has an important place in Turkic mythology and is also the national symbol of the Seljuk Empire, has been adopted by the Turkish Air Force since its establishment.)
- Anniversaries: 1 June
- Engagements: See list: War of Independence; Beytussebab rebellion; Ararat rebellion; Dersim rebellion; Korean War; Battle of Tillyria; Invasion of Cyprus; Operations against the PKK; Kurdistan Workers' Party insurgency; Operation Provide Comfort; Operation Deliberate Force; Operation Northern Watch; Operation Allied Force; Operation Enduring Freedom; Operation Northern Iraq; Operation Sun; Cross-border raids in Iraq; Operation Martyr Yalçın; Turkey–ISIL conflict; Operation Euphrates Shield; April 2017 airstrikes in Syria and Iraq; Operation Olive Branch; Operation Peace Spring; Turkish intervention in Libya; Operation Claw-Sword; Turkish offensive in northern Syria (2024–present); Operation Spring Shield; Operation Dawn of Freedom; 2024 Manbij offensive; 2024 Kobani clashes; East Aleppo offensive (2024–present)
- Website: www.hvkk.tsk.tr

Commanders
- Commander-in-Chief: President Recep Tayyip Erdoğan
- Minister of Defence: Yaşar Güler
- Chief of the General Staff: General Selçuk Bayraktaroğlu
- Air Force Commander: General Rafet Dalkıran
- Chief of Air Staff: Lieutenant General Ergin Dinç

Insignia
- Roundel

- Fin flash

- Flag

- Aviator badge

Aircraft flown
- Attack: Akıncı, Aksungur, Anka-S
- Bomber: F-4 Terminator
- Electronic warfare: CN-235, E-7T, ASOJ 23-A
- Fighter: F-16C/D
- Utility helicopter: AS532, T-70, UH-1H, T625
- Reconnaissance: TB1, Anka+A/B
- Trainer: TAI Hürkuş, KT-1, SF-260, T-38, T-41
- Transport: A400M, C-130, CN-235, Citation
- Tanker: KC-135

The Turkish Air Force (TuAF) (Turkish: Türk Hava Kuvvetleri) is the air and space force of the Turkish Armed Forces. It traces its origins to 1 June 1911 when it was founded as the Aviation Squadrons by the Ottoman Empire. It was composed of the Army Aviation Squadrons founded in 1911, and the Naval Aviation Squadrons founded in 1914 which used seaplanes. The Air Force as a branch of the Turkish Armed Forces was founded by the Grand National Assembly of Turkey on 23 April 1920.

As of 2023, according to International Institute for Strategic Studies, the Turkish Air Force has an active strength of 50,000 military personnel and operates approximately 295 manned fixed-wing aircraft, 35 helicopters, and 52 unmanned aerial vehicles. In terms of aircraft quantity, it is the largest air force in Europe. The world's first black pilot, Ahmet Ali Çelikten, the world's first female fighter pilot, Sabiha Gökçen, and the first female jet pilot accredited in NATO, Leman Altınçekiç, all served in the Turkish Air Force.

== History ==
=== First steps ===
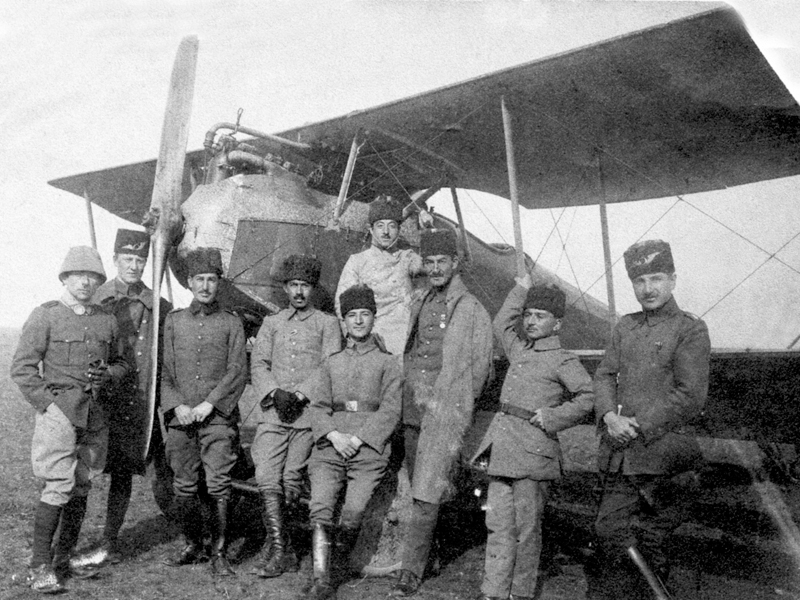
Turkish fighter pilots in front of the Halberstadt D.II fighter plane belonging to the 15th Fighter Battalion at the Battle of Gallipoli (1915) during World War I.

The history of Ottoman military aviation dates back to between 20 June 1909 and 1 July 1911. In 1911, the former commander of the Action Army Mahmud Sevket Pasa achieved to send some Turkish military officers to the French Bleriot aviation school. The same year the establishment of a Turkish airforce was taken into consideration. During the Italo-Turkish War of 1911, the Ottomans had to admit their disadvantage of not possessing an air force. Subsequently, the Ottomans employed German and French engineers who helped them to establish an air force with a dozen airplanes. The Ottoman Aviation Squadrons participated in the Balkan Wars (1912–1913) and World War I (1914–1918). The fleet size reached its apex in December 1916, when the Ottoman Aviation Squadrons had 90 active combat aircraft. Some early help for the Ottoman Aviation Squadrons came from the Imperial German Fliegertruppe (known by that name before October 1916), with future Central Powers 13-victory flying ace Hans-Joachim Buddecke flying with the Turks early in World War I as just one example. By July 1918, the Aviation Squadrons were reorganized as the General Inspectorate of Air Forces . (Kuva-yı Havaiye Müfettiş-i Umumiliği).

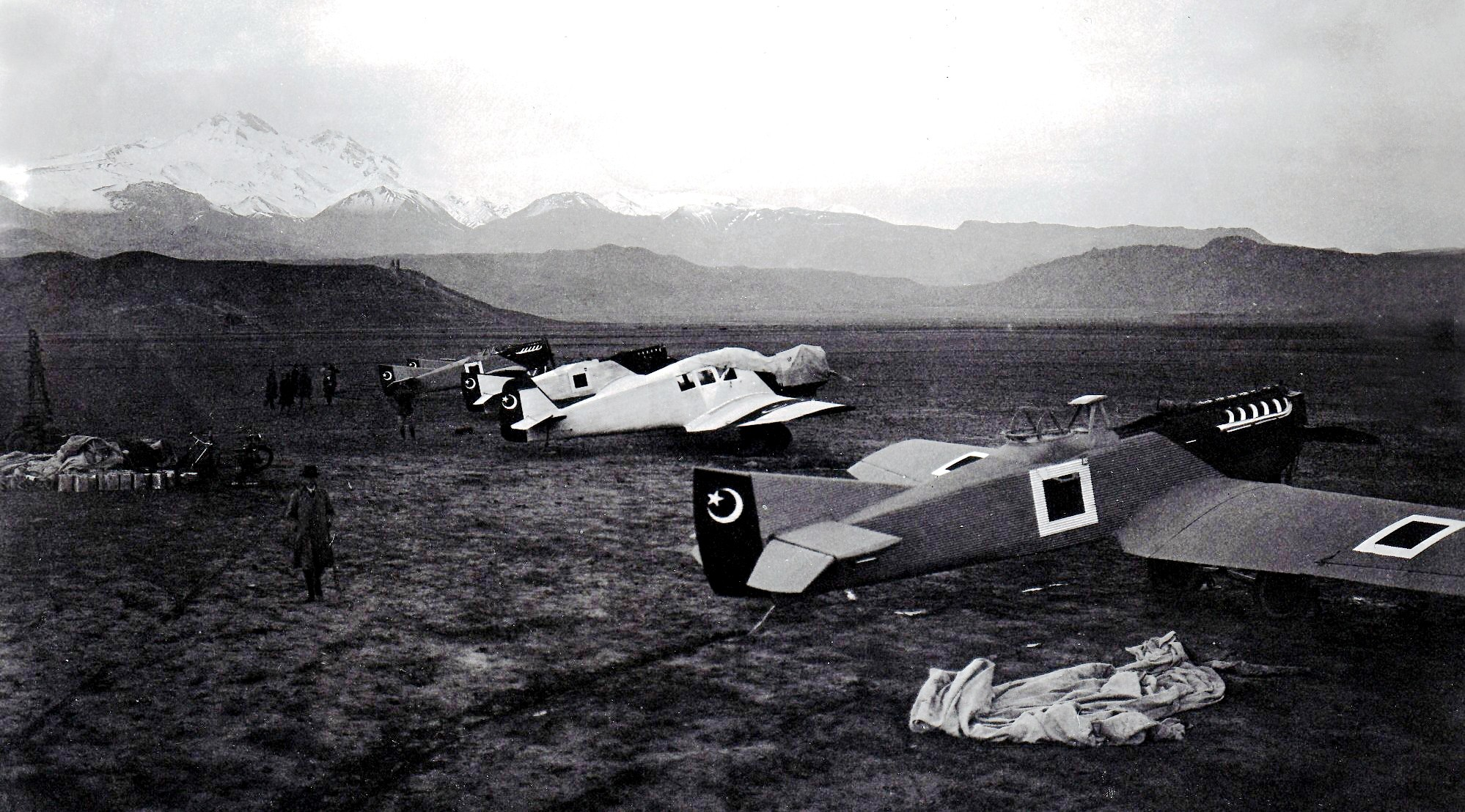
^{The TOMTAŞ factory in Kayseri was established in 1925 through a collaboration between Junkers and the Turkish government for producing 64 A20 aircraft, which were converted into A35s by equipping them with machine guns and bomb bays}

After the Armistice of Mudros and the occupation of the Ottoman Empire by the Allies in 1919, some Turkish aviators tried to build new units in Istanbul, İzmir, Konya, Elazığ and Diyarbakır with planes left over from World War I and tried to bring together flight personnel. During the Turkish War of Independence, Turkish pilots joined the Konya Air Station (Konya Hava İstasyonu). With the formation of the Grand National Assembly (GNA) by Mustafa Kemal and his colleagues on 23 April 1920, in Ankara, and the reorganization of the army, the Branch of Air Forces (Kuva-yı Havaiye Şubesi) was established under the Office of War (Harbiye Dairesi) of the GNA. A few damaged aircraft belonging to the GNA were repaired, and afterwards used in combat.

In July 1922, it was reorganized as the Inspectorate of Air Forces (Kuva-yı Havaiye Müfettişliği) at Konya.

=== Inspectorate of Air Forces ===
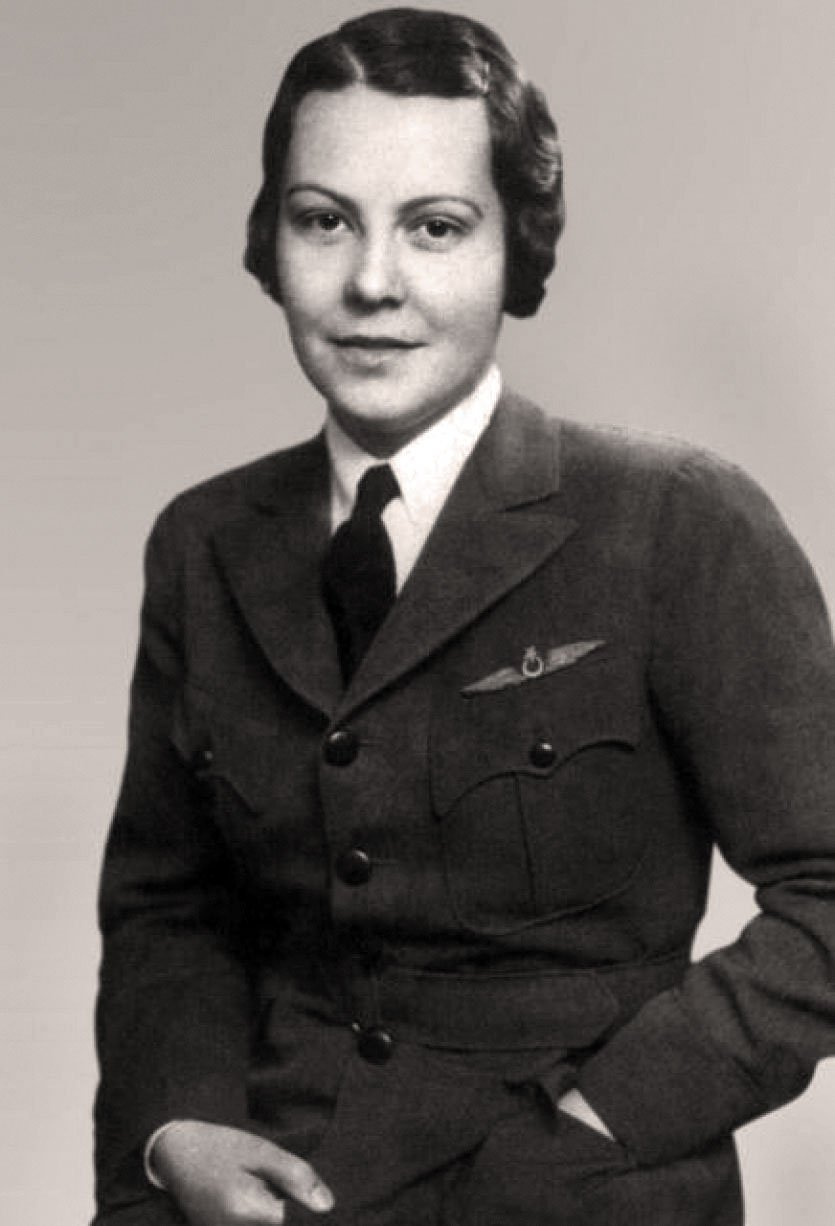
Sabiha Gökçen became the world's first female fighter pilot in 1937. Sabiha Gökçen International Airport in Istanbul is named after her

After the establishment of the Republic of Turkey on 29 October 1923, plans were made to form an air force. Originally consisting of three normal and one naval aviation units, and an air school, the number of units was increased to 10 normal and three naval aviation units. Starting in 1924, personnel were sent abroad for flight education. In 1925, the Air School was re-established in Eskişehir and its first students were graduated that same year. In the same year, the Air Force was deployed to take part in a campaign aimed to suppress the Sheikh Said rebellion. The Inspectorate of Air Forces was reorganized as the Undersecretariat of the Ministry of Defense in 1928 and new schools were found for non-pilot personnel. Some personnel were sent to the United Kingdom and France for training; others were sent to the United States and Italy in 1930.

From 1932, the air regiments were considered to be a separate combat arm and started training its own personnel. Turkish aviators wore blue uniforms from 1933.

The Air War College (Hava Harp Akademisi) was established in 1937.

=== Air Force Command ===
By 1940, Turkish air brigades had more than 500 combat aircraft in its inventory, becoming the largest air force in the Balkans and the Middle East. The growing inventory of air brigades required another structural change, which was made in 1940. The Air Undersecretariat under the Ministry of National Defense for logistical affairs and the General Staff for educational affairs were united to form the Air Force Command (Hava Kuvvetleri Komutanlığı) in 1944. Thus, the Air Force became a separate branch of the Turkish Armed Forces. The first Commander of the Turkish Air Force was General Zeki Doğan. Turkey did not enter World War II on the side of the Allies until February 1945. However, the Turkish Armed Forces went on full alert and were prepared for war following the military alliance between neighbouring Bulgaria and the Axis Powers which was formalized in March 1941, and the occupation of neighbouring Greece by the Axis Powers in April 1941. Within a year, Turkey's borders were surrounded by German forces in the northwest and west, and Italian forces in the southwest. The Turkish Air Force made daily reconnaissance flights over Bulgaria, Greece, the Italian Islands in the Sea of Islands, and the Dodecanese Islands which then belonged to Italy, to monitor the positions of the Axis forces. The large cities in western Turkey were darkened at nights, and anti-aircraft guns and searchlights were deployed for defence against possible enemy planes. In addition to sales from foreign providers, UK munitions worth up to £34 million were provided to Turkey under the terms of the Armaments Credits of 1938 and 1939, under loan or credit arrangements, and between April 1943, and June 1945, Great Britain supplied an additional £26 million worth of war materials on "Mutual Aid" terms to support the general interests of the United Nations. The Turkish Air Force received large numbers of new aircraft in this period, including Supermarine Spitfires, Curtiss-Wright CW-22s, Fairey Battles, Avro Ansons, Hawker Hurricanes, Morane-Saulnier M.S.406s, Curtiss Tomahawks, Curtiss P-40 Kittyhawk, Westland Lysanders, Consolidated B-24 Liberators, Bristol Blenheim IV/V, Bristol Beaufort, Bristol Beaufighters, Focke-Wulf Fw 190s, Martin 187 Baltimore, De Havilland DH.98 Mosquitos, Douglas B-26 Invaders, P-47D Thunderbolt and Douglas Dakotas.

The Air Machinist School (Hava Makinist Okulu) was reorganized as Aircraft Maintenance School (Hava Uçak Bakım Okulu) on 2 January 1950 to unite schools responsible for training non-pilot Air Force personnel. The beginning of Mutual Assistance Program military aid from the United States started a qualitative modernization and reorganisation of the entire Turkish Armed Forces, including the Air Force. Eight pilots were sent to the United States for jet pilot training. They graduated in 1951 and started training jet pilots in the Turkish Air Force. In the same year, the 9th Fighter Wing (9’uncu Ana Jet Üssü) was founded in Balıkesir as Turkey's first fighter wing; the 191st, 192nd, and 193rd squadrons being the first ones which were established. Further training in the United States followed, usually involving jet manufacturers. In 1951 the Air Force Academy was formed, including some air schools in Eskişehir; its first academic year started on 1 October 1951. In 1956 the Hava Eğitim Kolordu Komutanlığı (Air Education Corps Command) was founded and all education was united under this command. The command was renamed as Hava Eğitim Komutanlığı (Air Education Command) in 1957.

When Turkey joined NATO in 1952, additional attention and resources became available for the Air Force. In 1962 the Taktik Hava Kuvveti (Tactical Air Force) was founded by upgrading the Hava Tümeni (Air Division) units to corps-level organizations.

In 1972, the TAF was significantly reorganized. The roundel was changed, the fleets were rebuilt and propelled airplanes were phased out in favour of jet-powered ones.

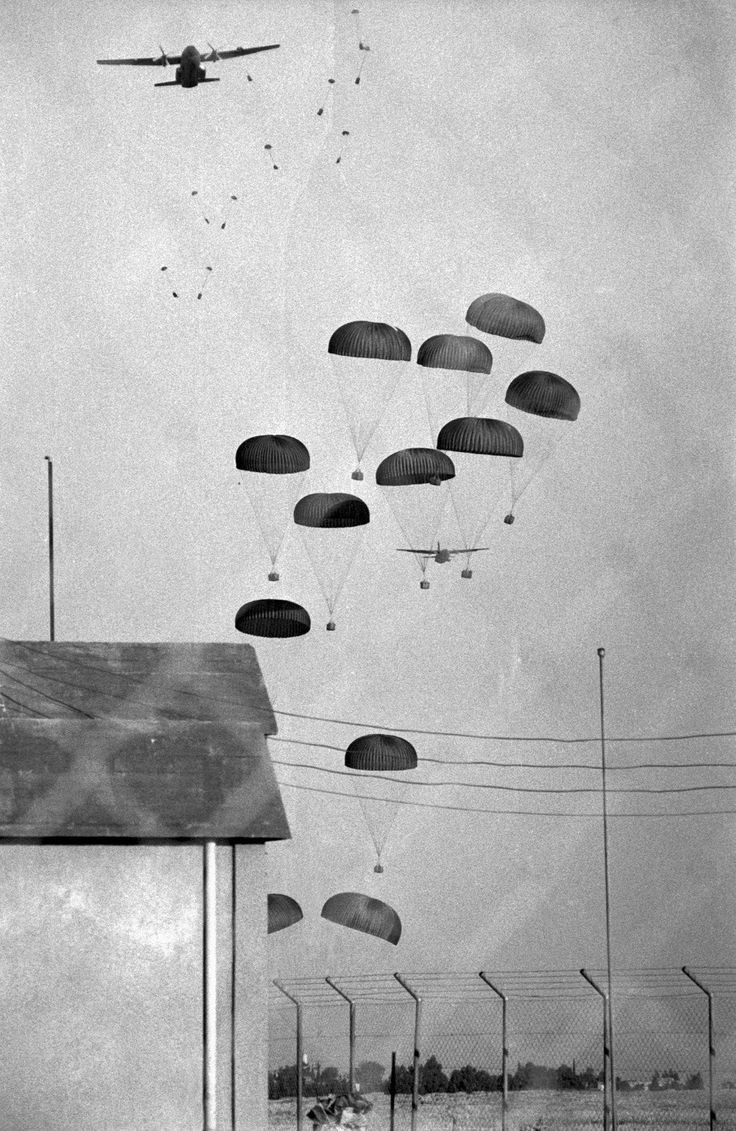
Turkish paratroopers jumping from military transport aircraft during the air landing operation off the coast of Kyrenia in the initial part of the Atilla Operation, July 20, 1974

In 1974 the Air Force was employed during the Turkish invasion of Cyprus. With the arrival of the first batch of 40 third generation F-4E Phantom II fighter jets ordered in 1972 and acquired between 1974 and 1978, the Air Force was reorganized. This was followed by a second order in 1978 of another batch of 40 units (32 F-4Es and 8 RF-4Es, deliveries began in 1980). Another order for 70 more F-4Es were acquired between 1981 and 1987, and 40 more F-4Es were acquired between 1991 and 1992, as well as 46 more RF-4E reconnaissance aircraft. In total, the Turkish Air Force received 236 F-4 Phantom II (182 F-4E and 54 RF-4E) aircraft. In 1997, IAI (Israel Aircraft Industries) was selected to upgrade 54 of Turkey's F-4E fighter aircraft to the F-4E Terminator 2020 standard. The upgraded aircraft were delivered between 1999 and 2003; of these, 26 aircraft were upgraded in Israel and the remaining 28 were upgraded in Turkey.

In 1983 Turkey ordered the fourth-generation F-16 Fighting Falcon fighter aircraft and started receiving them in 1987. The Turkish Air Force has a total of 270 F-16C/D aircraft in its inventory, all of them Block 30/40/50 models. Turkey is one of five countries that locally produce F-16 fighter jets.

In 1995, the Turkish Air Force took part in NATO's Operation Deliberate Force.

In 1998, the Turkish Armed Forces announced a program of new equipment, with $45 billion earmarked for the overhaul of the Turkish Air Force, and included the commissioning new combat aircraft (consisting of multi-role and fifth generation stealth fighters) and helicopters (consisting of heavy lift, attack, medium lift and light general purpose helicopters).

Turkey provided 18 F-16s for the NATO campaign against Serbia, Operation Allied Force, in 1999. Of these, 11 TAI-built F-16s were stationed at the NATO base in Aviano, Italy, while the other 7 were based in Ankara, Turkey. All were equipped with laser-guided bombs using the LANTIRN night vision system. Turkish jets had previously patrolled Balkan airspace, providing protection for attacking aircraft. During this allied air campaign, TAI-built F-16s set a world CAP record by patrolling for 9 hours and 22 minutes above the Balkan theatre. Normally, CAP missions last between 3 and 4 hours.

Turkey participated in the NATO air policing over Bosnia-Herzegovina, employing two squadrons (one in the Ghedi fighter wing, and after 2000 one in the Aviano fighter wing). They returned to Turkey in 2001.

In 2006, four Turkish F-16 fighter jets were deployed for NATO's Baltic Air Policing operation.

In December 2007, the Turkish Air Force initiated Operation Northern Iraq, which continued until the end of February 2008, eventually becoming a part of Operation Sun. At the initial phase of this operation, on 16 December 2007, the TuAF used the AGM-65 Maverick and AGM-142 Popeye/Have Nap during a night bombardment for the first time.

In August 2011, the Turkish Air Force launched multiple aerial raids against the PKK in Iraq, striking 132 targets in six days. In 2013, the Turkish Air Force began striking ISIL targets in Syria and Iraq. In July 2015, during Operation Martyr Yalçın, the Turkish Air Force launched air strikes against ISIL and PKK targets in Syria and Iraq.

On 22 June 2012, during the Syrian civil war, a Turkish RF-4E Phantom II reconnaissance aircraft was shot down by a Syrian surface-to-air missile and crashed into the Mediterranean Sea; both the pilot and the navigator lost their lives. On 23 March 2014, a Turkish F-16 shot down a Syrian MiG-23 near the Turkey-Syria border; the Syrian pilot was reported to have safely ejected from the aircraft. On 24 November 2015, a Turkish F-16 shot down a Russian Su-24 strike aircraft which, according to Turkish authorities, had violated Turkish airspace by crossing the Turkey-Syria border. The Russian government contested those claims, stating that the aircraft never entered Turkish airspace. The pilot and navigator both ejected from the aircraft; the navigator was rescued, but the pilot was shot and killed by Syrian rebel ground fire while descending by parachute. The incident sparked a crisis in Turkey's relations with Russia, which were restored in 2016 when Turkish President Erdoğan expressed his regret and condolences to Russian President Putin.

Other important air strikes by the Turkish Air Force in recent years include Operation Euphrates Shield (2016–2017), Operation Olive Branch (2018–2019), Operation Peace Spring (2019), Turkish intervention in Libya (2020), Operation Spring Shield (2020), and Operation Claw Sword (2022).

=== Turkish Air Force and NATO ===
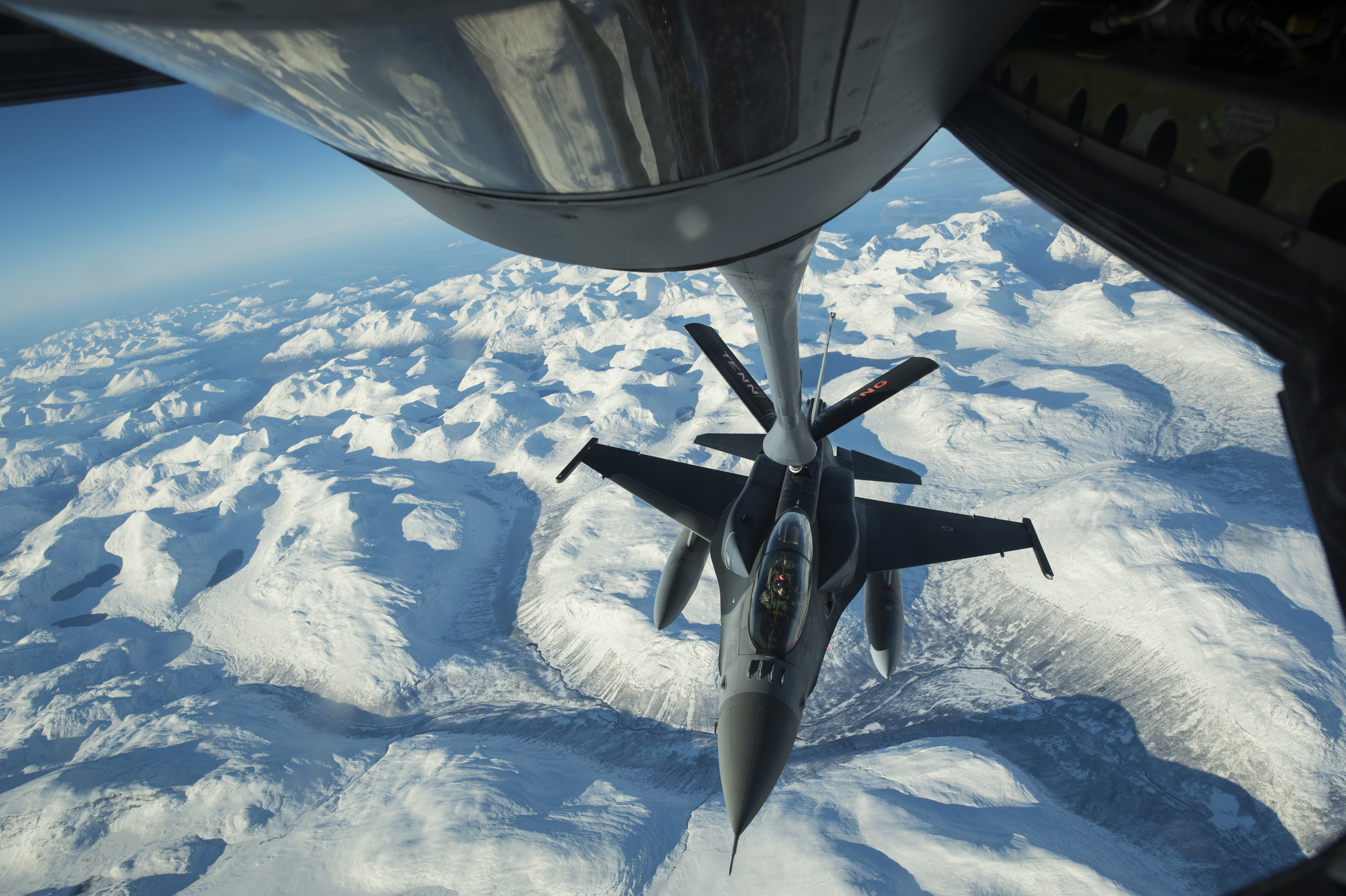
A Turkish F-16C flies into position to make contact with the boom of a USAF KC-135 Stratotanker assigned to the 134th Air Refueling Wing during Exercise Trident Juncture 2018 near Kallax Air Base, Sweden

The Turkish Air Force contributes personnel and aircraft to the command centers and air bases of NATO and actively participates in the exercises of the alliance in Europe and North America.

The headquarters of NATO's Allied Air Component Command for Southern Europe (formerly designated as AIRSOUTH and originally headquartered in Naples, Italy) was established in İzmir, Turkey, on 11 August 2004. Allied Air Command İzmir was deactivated on 1 June 2013, when the Allied Air Command (AIRCOM) at the Ramstein Air Base in Germany became the sole Allied Air Component Command of NATO.

Turkey is one of five NATO member states which are part of the nuclear sharing policy of the alliance, together with Belgium, Germany, Italy, and the Netherlands. A total of 90 B61 nuclear bombs are hosted at the Incirlik Air Base, 40 of which are allocated for use by the Turkish Air Force in case of a nuclear conflict, but their use requires the approval of NATO.

=== Turkish Aerobatics Teams ===
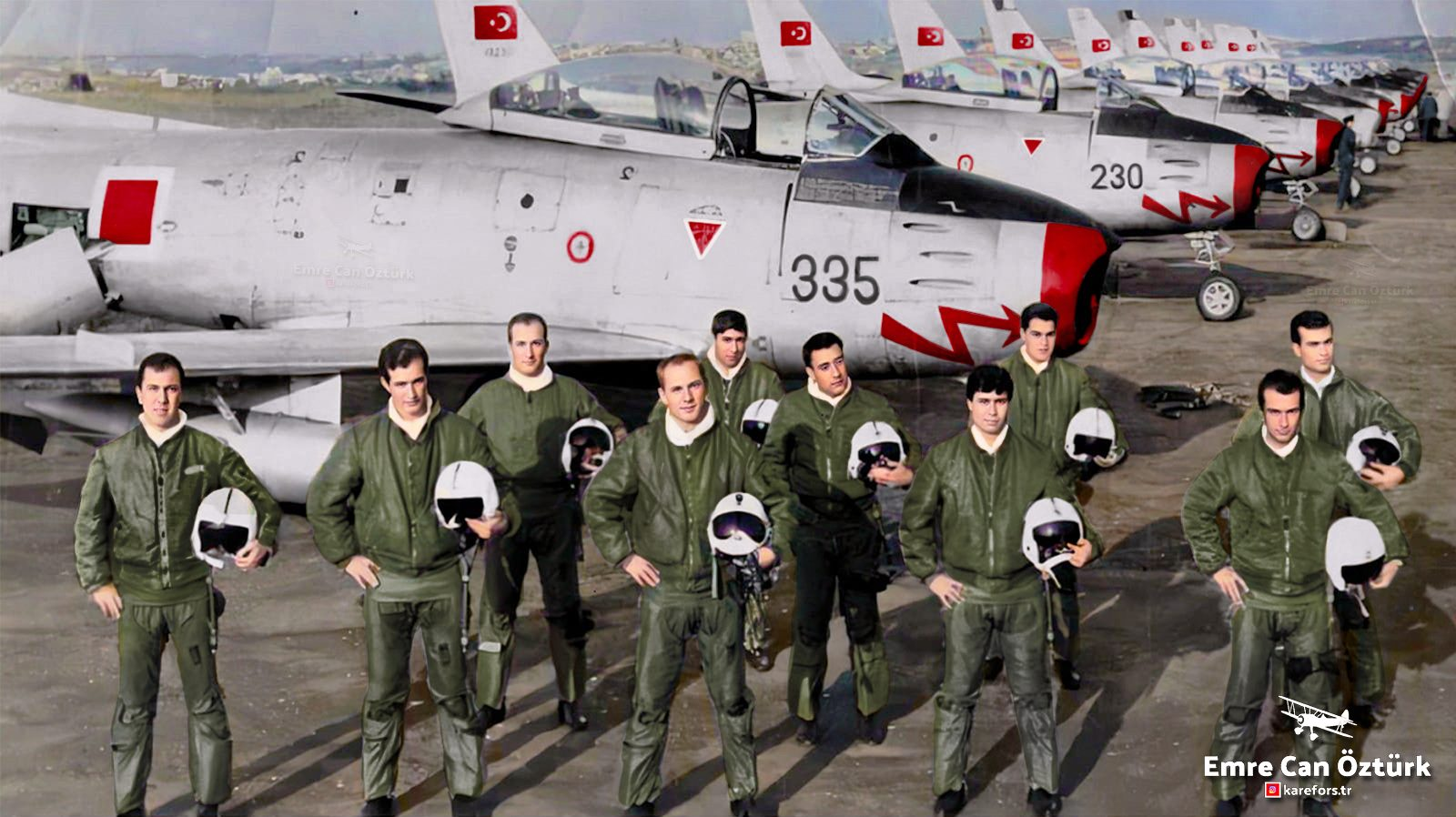
Yarasalar (Bats) demo team with their F-86 Sabres, 1960s

After the first aerobatics formation in the history of the Turkish Air Force was performed by Lt. Gen. Fazıl Bey on March 5, 1914, at an altitude of 1312 feet, other Turkish pilots also tried various acrobatic moves. The first "official" aerobatics studies within the Turkish Air Force began in 1926 at the Turkish Air Force Academy. The group, which was formed under the leadership of flight instructor Plt. Gen. Enver Akoğlu and included Plt. Gen. Tekin Arıburun, carried out successful studies. As opposed to studies, the first aerobatic team in the Turkish Air Force was established in 1952 under the name "Milli" (National), immediately after the transition to jet aircraft. This team, which was established at the 9th Air Base Command in Balıkesir, the first jet base of the Turkish Air Force, used the F-84G Thunderbird. This first team, call sign "Milli", which operated between 1952 and 1962, achieved significant successes. The acrobatic team named Milli, which performed numerous flight displays in Turkey, managed to make a name for itself with the shows it organized primarily in Italy and Belgium. The call sign of the second acrobatic team in history, established in 1955 at the 4th Air Base Command in Ankara, was "Uçan Kuğular" (Flying Swans) Using F-86E Sabre aircraft painted in red and white with swan motifs embroidered on the nose sections, this aerobatics team continued its activities for 10 years. "Uçan Kuğular" gained an important place in Turkish aviation history in the shows it performed in 1964. The aerobatics team, call sign "Akrep" (Scorpion) established towards the end of 1957 at the 8th Air Base Command in Diyarbakır was the third Turkish aerobatics team in history; It continued its activities until 1959. The acro team, whose aircraft type was F-84G, participated in various shows both in Turkey and abroad (Pakistan). The fourth acro team in Turkish aviation history, bearing the call sign "Yarasalar", was established in 1964 at the 5th Main Jet Base Command in Merzifon. This acro team, whose aircraft type was F-86E Sabre and whose aircraft were painted with a special motif in black and white, operated for 2 years and performed 5, 9 and 12 (plane?) aerobatics shows. This acro team, which was established in 1966 and called “Kartal” (Eagle) from 1966 to 1971, received the call sign “Coşkun” (Enthusiastic) named after the Lit. Coşkun Turan, who was on duty in the team, and was killed during a mission flight on 21 May 1971. The aircraft type of the acro team, established at the Bandırma 6th Main Jet Base Command, is the F-5A Freedom Fighter. The acro team, called “Coşkun”, performed flight demonstrations in Turkey and around the world (1971 in Italy). No continuously active acroteam was established between 1971 and 1992.

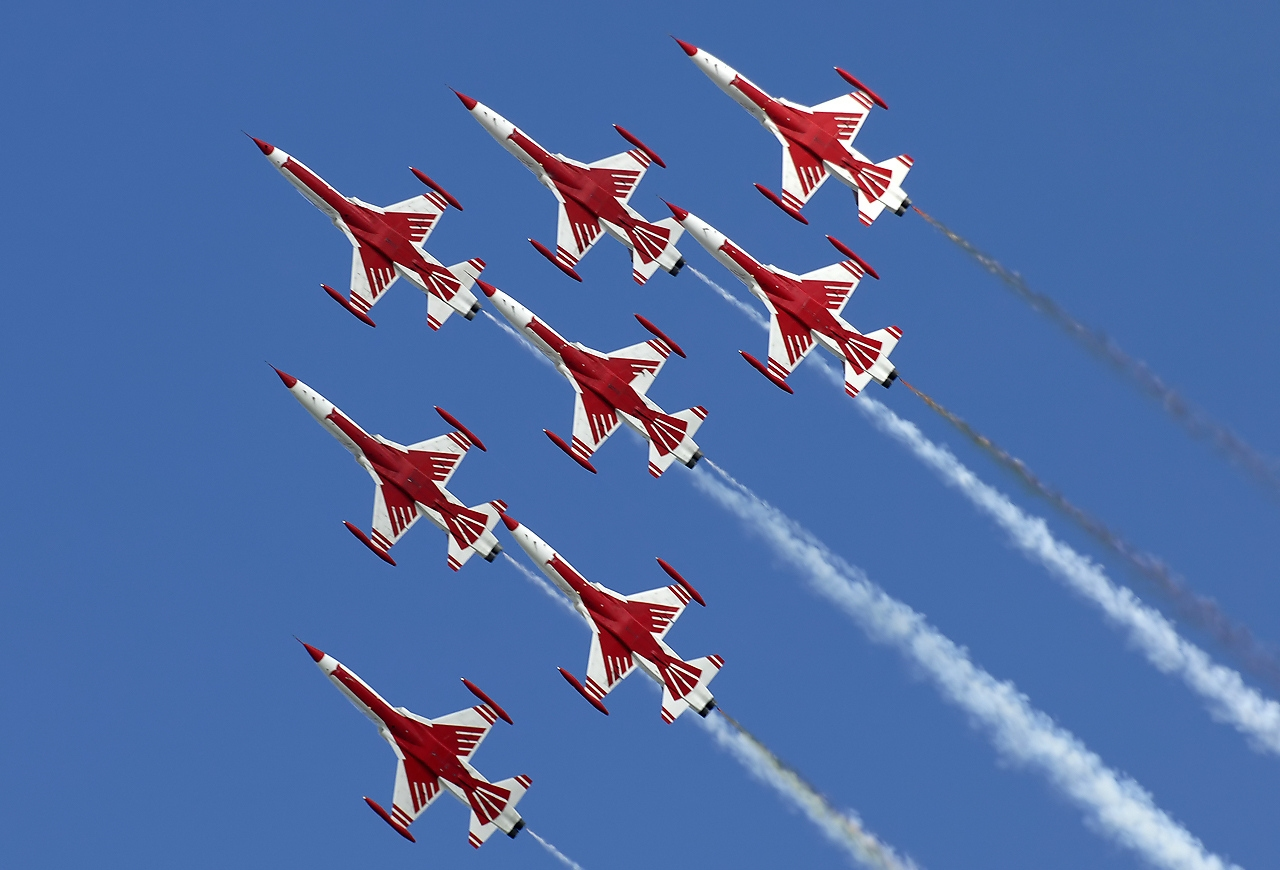
NF-5A aircraft of the Turkish Stars during a demonstration flight at Kecskemét Air Base, Hungary, 2010

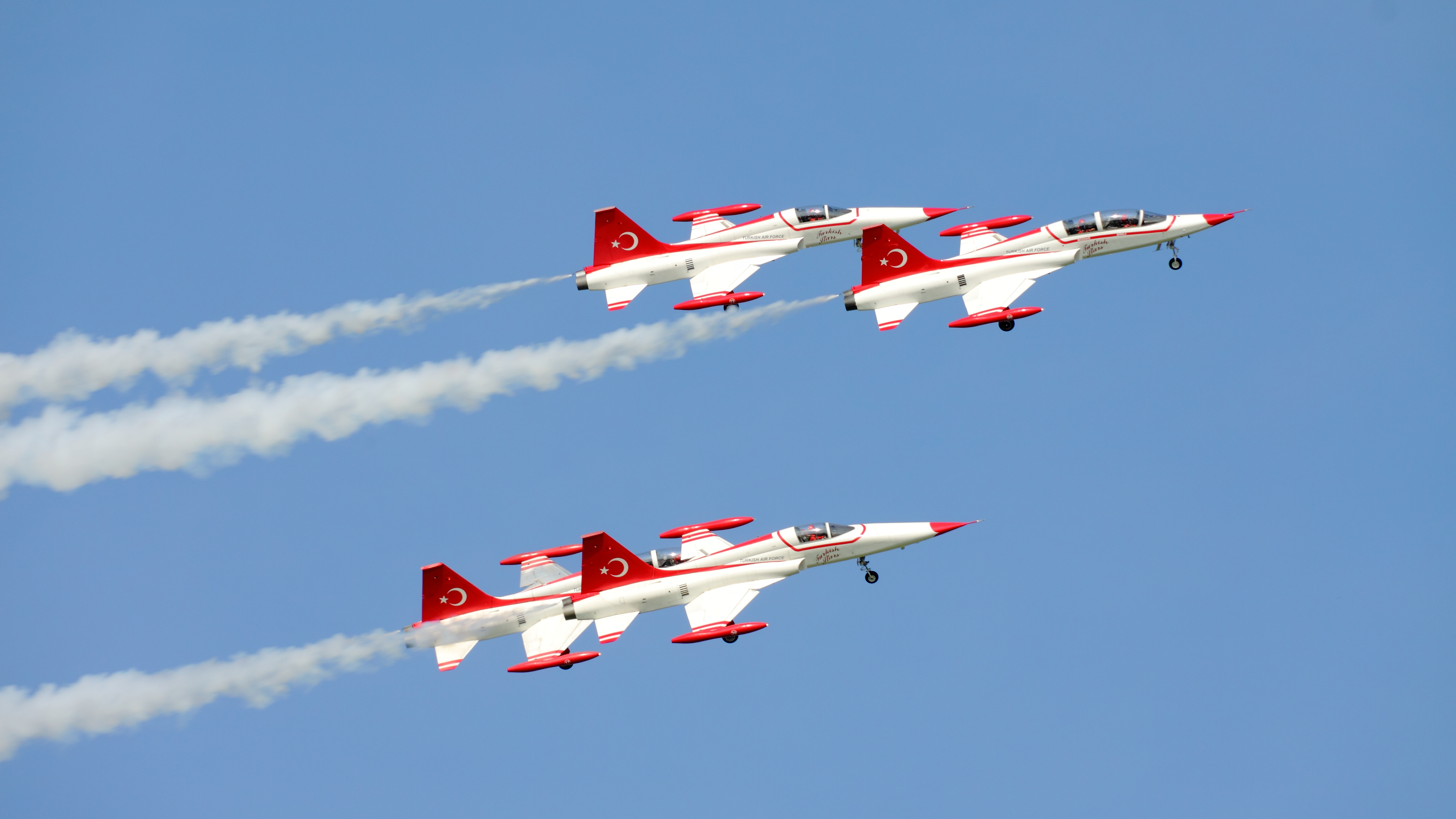
Performance by the Turkish Stars held in Ostrava during the 2011 NATO Days celebrations

After a 20-year hiatus, the Turkish Air Force decided to establish an acroteam again and started activities to implement the project in 1992. In accordance with the directives of the Commander of the Turkish Air Force, Gen. Halis Burhan, work was started for the establishment of an acroteam in 1992 and approval was received for the establishment of an acroteam within the 132nd Weapon Tactics and Standardized Squadron Command at the Konya 3rd Main Jet Base on 11 September 1992. While the establishment and examination studies were continuing rapidly, the order to establish an acroteam consisting of four NF-5 wings within the 132nd Squadron was issued on 7 November 1992. In the meantime, the selection of the first four pilots who would constitute the core of the acroteam was made. In 1993, double training was started and the planned acrobatic movements were tried and the desired result was achieved after a flight of five sorties. Later, training of right and left wing fliers was started and quadruple training was started. In the meantime, some of the personnel working in the acroteam were sent to England, Canada and Italy to conduct research on the subject. In order to fulfill the acroteam duty with more safety and efficiency, a study was started on April 27, 1993, for the modifications to be made on the NF-5 aircraft, primarily the smoke system and painting of the aircraft, to increase flight safety. While the studies were ongoing, on June 18, 1993, the closing day of the Turkish Air Force Command Shooting Competitions, the Turkish Stars acroteam performed its first official display as a quartet to state dignitaries and other guests at the 4th Main Jet Base Command in Ankara. Following this display the Turkish Stars, which gained fleet status, managed to make a name for itself as the youngest supersonic acrobatic team in the world. In August 1993, the aircraft modification/painting activities were initiated by the 1st Main Jet Base Command and Maintenance Center Command in Eskişehir. During this process, five- and six-wing flight training was also initiated. The modifications and changes made to the 9 NF-5 and 1 NF-5B aircraft allocated to the Turkish Stars acroteam were completed in July 1994 and delivered to the unit.

== Equipment ==
=== Fighter aircraft ===
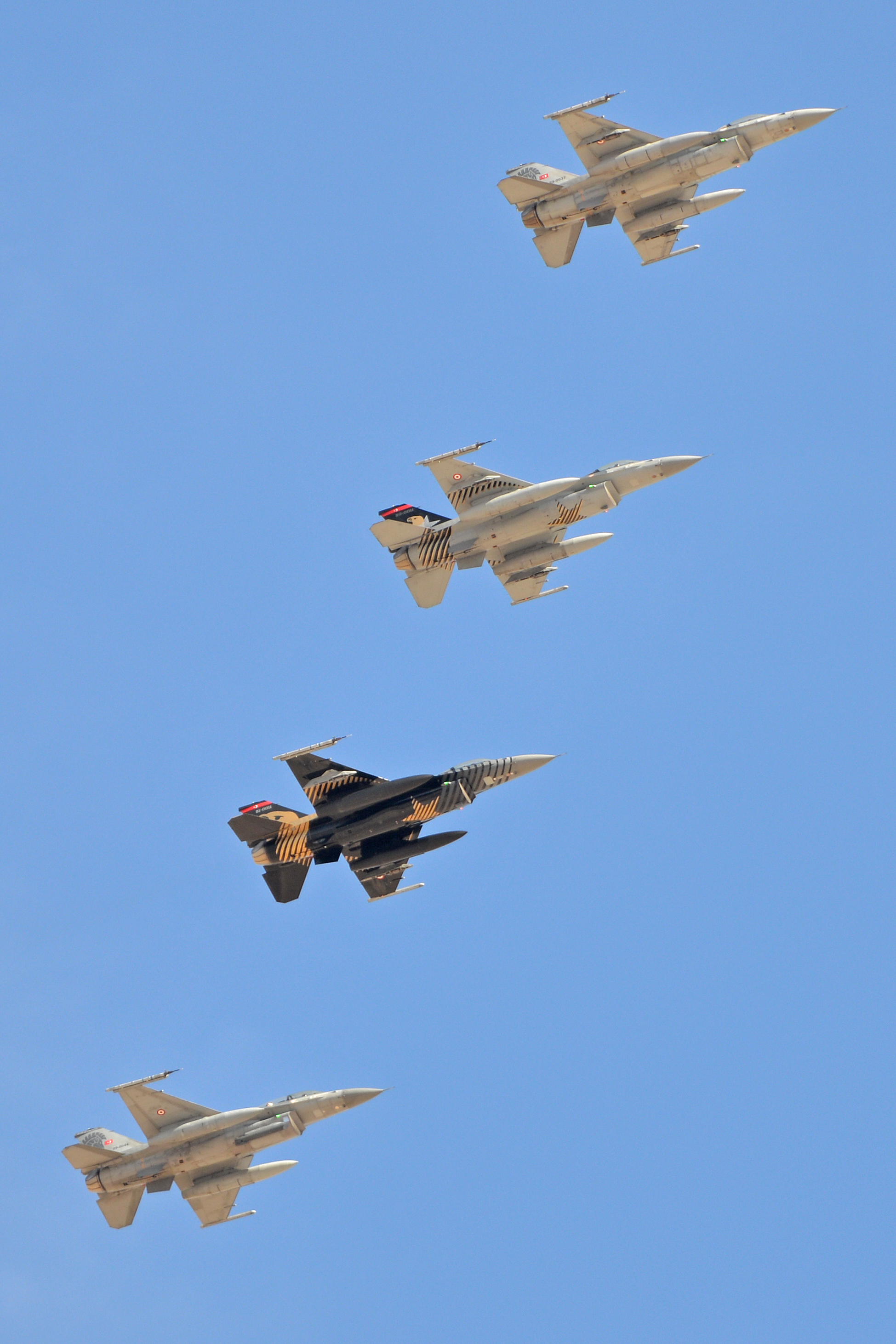
F-16Cs of SoloTürk during the Red Flag 16-2 exercise at Nellis Air Force Base, NV, USA

In 1984, the Turkish Aerospace Industries (TAI) was established and Turkey started to produce fighter aircraft locally under license, including a total of 232 F-16 Fighting Falcons (Block 30/40/50) for the Turkish Air Force, making it one of only five countries in the world which produces fourth generation jet fighters. The air force had previously received 8 F-16s that were purchased directly from the United States, bringing the total number of F-16s received by the air force to 245. In 2007 TAI built 30 F-16 Block 50+ aircraft for the airforce and applied the CCIP modernization program to 117 of its Block 40 and 50 F-16s, bringing them to the Block 50+ configuration.As of 1 June 2026, the U.S. Department of War had not publicly announced a firm production contract with Lockheed Martin for Turkey’s procurement of 40 F-16 Block 70/72 fighters, although Turkish officials stated that the Letter of Offer and Acceptance (LOA) had entered into force following an initial payment.

Dozens of TAI-built F-16s were also exported to other countries, particularly in the Middle East. A total of 46 TAI-built F-16s have been exported to the Egyptian Air Force under the Peace Vector IV Program (1993–1995), making it TAI's second-largest F-16 customer after the Turkish Air Force.

On 11 July 2002, Turkey became a Level 3 partner of the F-35 Joint Strike Fighter (JSF) development program, and on 25 January 2007, Turkey officially joined the production phase of the JSF program, agreeing to purchase a total of 116 F-35 Lightning II aircraft (100 F-35A CTOL for the Turkish Air Force and 16 F-35B STOVL for the Turkish Naval Forces).

Turkey placed an initial order for 30 F-35 Lightning IIs, six of which were completed as of 2019 and two more were at the assembly line in 2020. The first four F-35As were delivered to Luke Air Force Base between 21 June 2018 and 5 April 2019 for the training of Turkish pilots.

On 17 July 2019, the United States Senate passed a defense spending bill which prevented the Turkish Air Force from obtaining the Lockheed Martin F-35 fighter aircraft due to the country's acquisition of the S-400 missile system from Russia. As of 2023, the U.S. has not refunded the $1.4 billion payment made by Turkey for purchasing the F-35A fighters and instead offered to support the sale of Block 70 F-16 fighter jets and the modernization program for the F-16 fleet of the Turkish Airforce.

In January 2024, the U.S. State Department passed a $23 billion package that included the modernization of existing F-16 and new 40 F-16 Block 70 fighter aircraft, as well as a wide range of ammunitions. As of August 2024, the project is continuing on as planned. As of 1 June 2026, the U.S. Department of War had not publicly announced a firm production contract with Lockheed Martin for Turkey’s procurement of 40 F-16 Block 70/72 fighters, although Turkish officials stated that the Letter of Offer and Acceptance (LOA) had entered into force following an initial payment.

=== Airborne early warning and control (AEW&C) aircraft ===
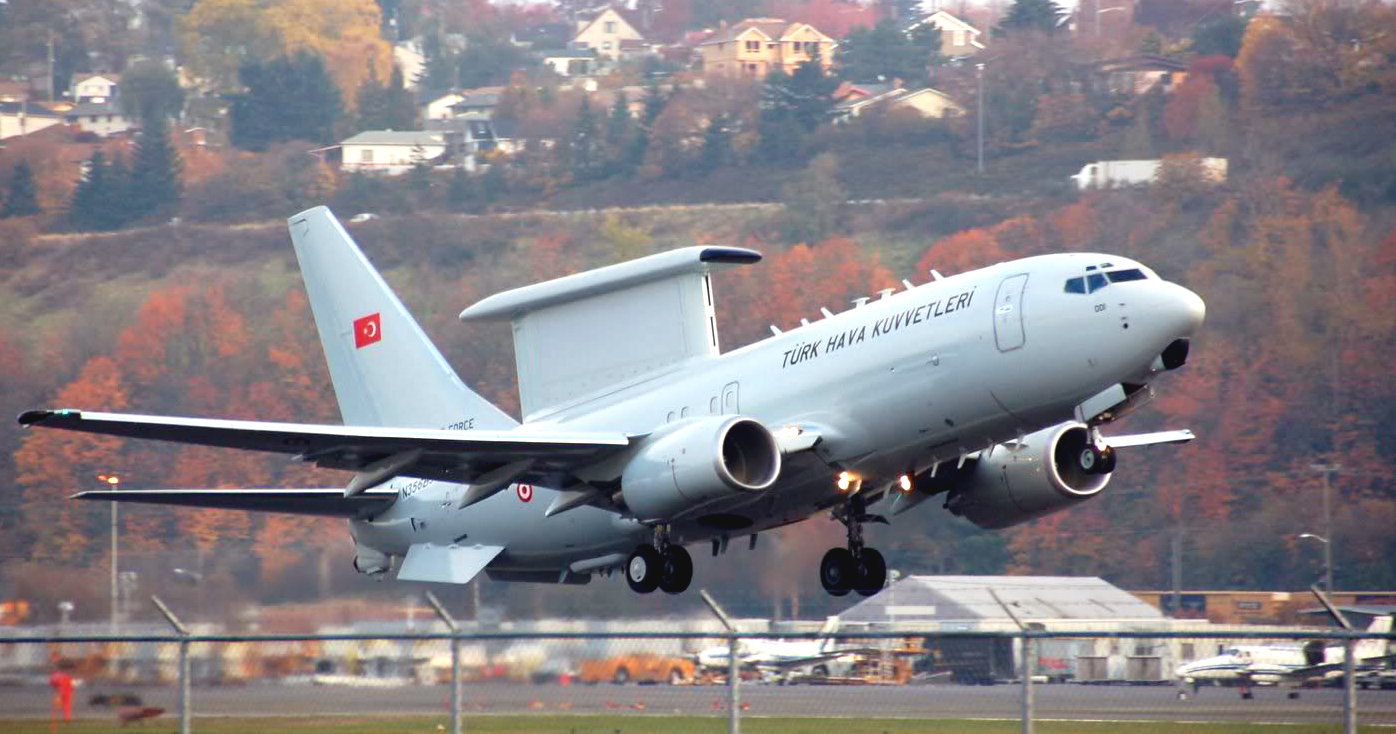
Boeing 737 AEW&C Peace Eagle (code 13–001) of the Turkish Air Force in Seattle, WA, United States

A total of four Boeing 737 AEW&C Peace Eagle (Barış Kartalı) aircraft (together with ground support systems) were ordered by the Turkish Air Force, with an option for two more aircraft. TAI is the primary subcontractor for the Peace Eagle parts production, aircraft modification, assembly and tests. Another subcontractor, HAVELSAN, is responsible for system analysis and software support.

Signed on 23 July 2003, the contract to Boeing was valued at US$1.385 billion, which was later reduced by US$59 million because some of the requirements were not met. The down payment to Boeing amounted to US$637 million. The project consists of the delivery of 737-700 airframes, ground radars and control systems, ground control segments for mission crew training, mission support and maintenance support.

Peace Eagle 1 was modified and tested by Boeing Integrated Defense Systems in Seattle, Washington, USA. Peace Eagle 2, 3 and 4 were modified and tested at the facilities of TAI in Ankara, Turkey, with the participation of Boeing and a number of Turkish companies. As of mid-2007, systems integration was ongoing and airworthiness certification works continued. In September 2007, Boeing completed the first test flight of Turkey's AEW&C 737.

On 4 June 2008, it was announced that Turkish Aerospace Industries completed the first in-country modification of a Boeing 737-700 into an airborne early warning and control (AEW&C) platform for Turkey's Peace Eagle program.

The first Peace Eagle aircraft, named Kuzey (meaning North) was formally accepted into Turkish Air Force inventory on 21 February 2014. The remaining three aircraft will be named Güney (South), Doğu (East) and Batı (West).

The six-year delay was a result of Boeing experiencing difficulties while developing some features required by the Turkish Air Force. Turkey demanded compensation of US$183 million from Boeing for the delay. The payment of the penalty is requested in the form of increased start-up support period from an initially planned two years to five years, as well as three years of software maintenance service and around US$32 million in spare parts.

=== Aerial refueling tanker aircraft ===
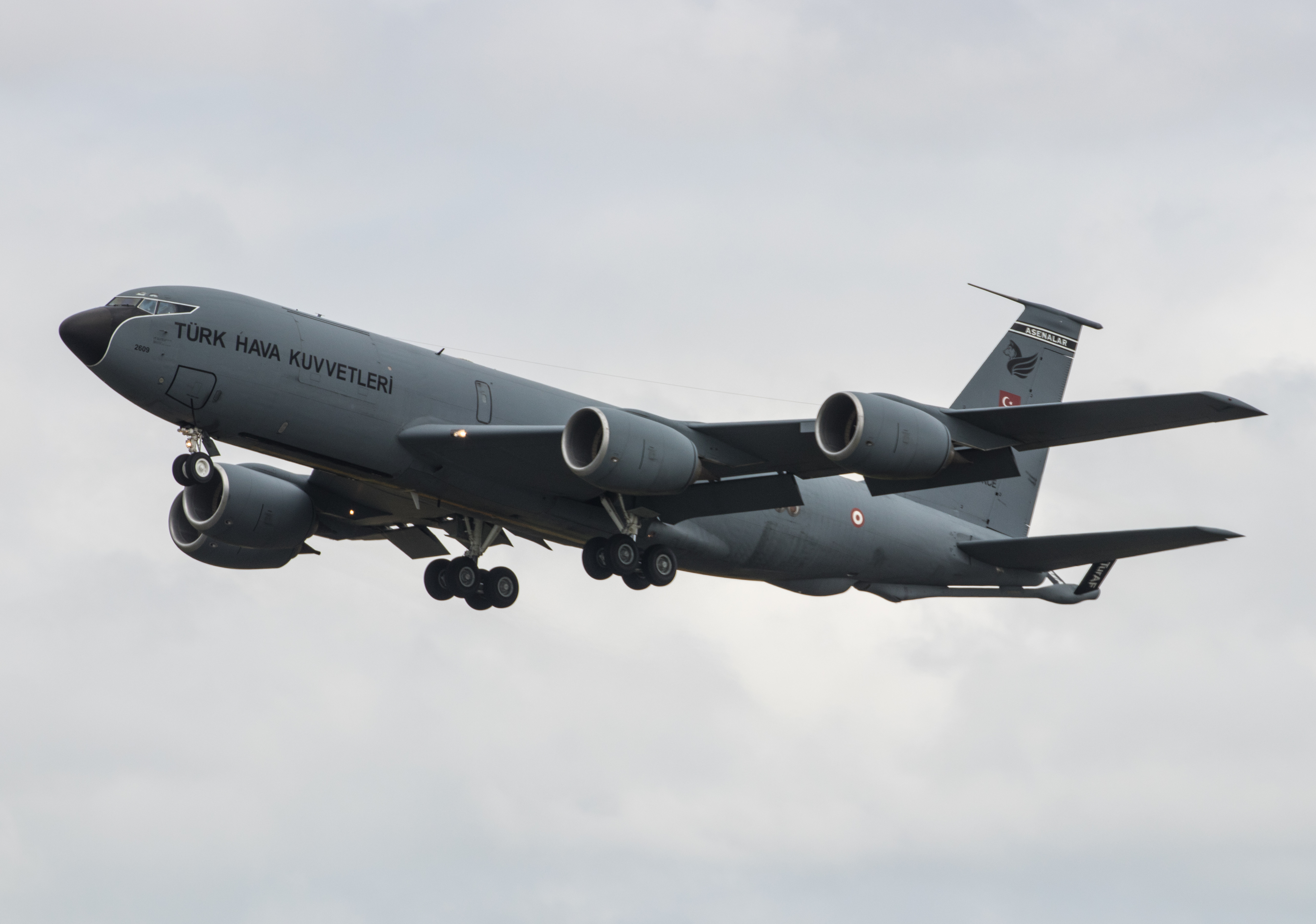
Boeing KC-135R Stratotanker (code 57–2609) of the Turkish Air Force at the 2019 Royal International Air Tattoo, RAF Fairford, England

In 1994 the Turkish Air Force signed a deal to lease two and purchase seven Boeing KC-135R Stratotanker aerial refueling tanker aircraft. Following the arrival of all seven purchased aircraft, the two leased KC-135Rs were returned to the United States.

All seven KC-135R Stratotanker aircraft of the Turkish Air Force have received the Pacer CRAG (Compass, Radar And GPS) upgrade.

The KC-135R-CRAG Stratotanker aerial refueling tanker aircraft of the Turkish Air Force are operated by the 101st Squadron, stationed at the Incirlik Air Base.

=== Military transport aircraft ===
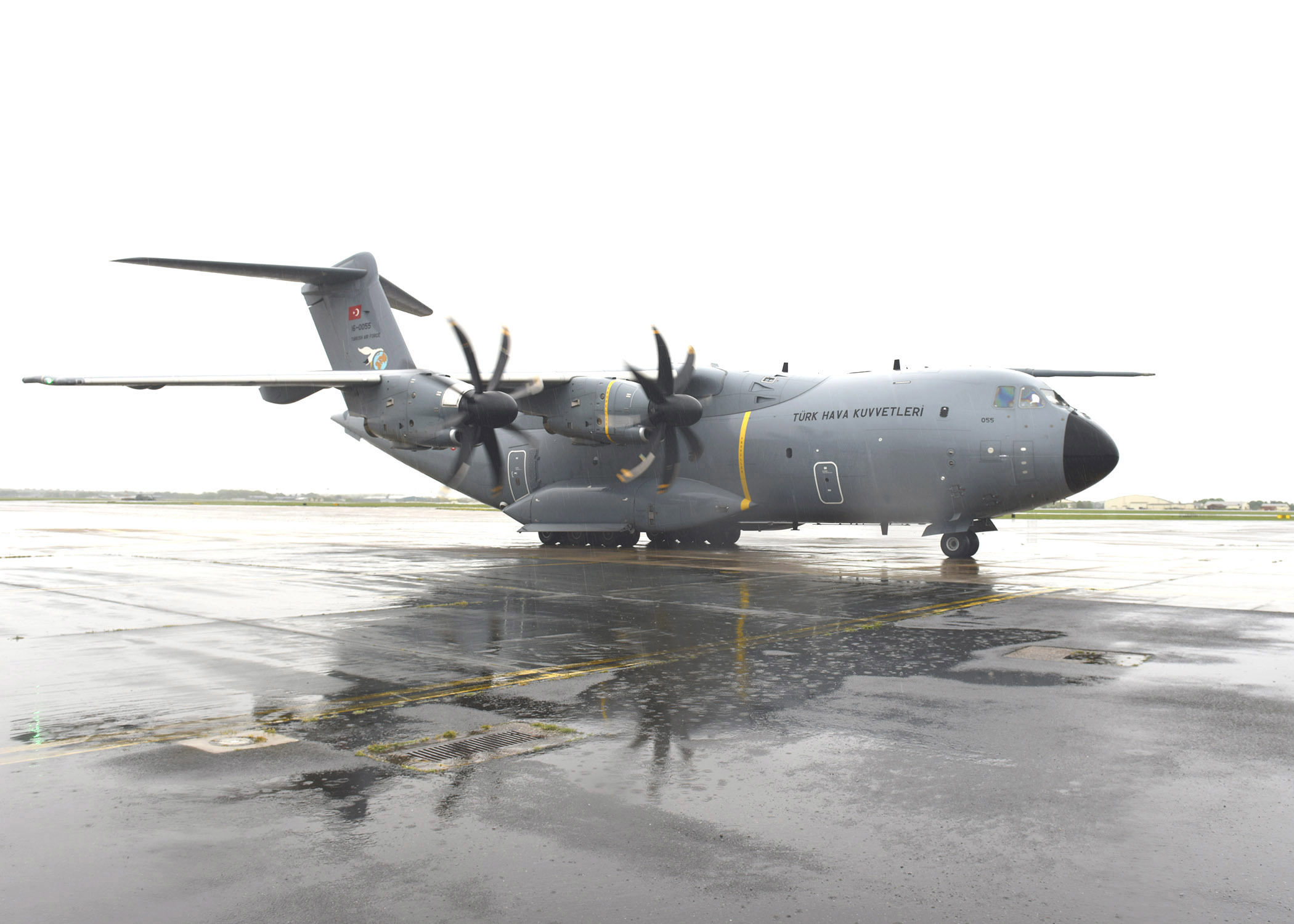
Airbus A400M Atlas (code 16–0055) of the Turkish Air Force taxies upon arrival at RAF Mildenhall, England

Turkey is a partner nation in the Airbus A400M Atlas production program.

The Turkish Air Force has ordered a total of ten A400M Atlas aircraft. The first two A400M Atlas were delivered to the Turkish Air Force in 2014. All A400M Atlas deliveries to the Turkish Air Force were completed by 2018.

TAI produces several components of the A400M Atlas, including the middle-front fuselage, emergency exit doors, rear fuselage upper panels, rear upper escape doors, ailerons and spoilers; which are sent to the Airbus Military factory in Spain for assembly.

The Turkish Air Force also uses the C-130 Hercules, C-160 Transall and CASA CN-235 military transport aircraft.

The transport helicopters used by the Turkish Armed Forces include the Boeing CH-47 Chinook, Sikorsky S-70 Black Hawk and Eurocopter AS532 Cougar.

Turkey will procure 12 C-130J-30(C4) Super Hercules transportation aircraft from RAF stocks.

=== Stand-Off Jammer / Electronic Warfare Aircraft ===
Hava SOJ (stand-off jammer) or ASOJ 23-A is a Turkish airborne electronic warfare programme for the Turkish Air Force. The system is designed to provide stand-off jamming and electronic attack capabilities against enemy radar and command-and-control systems. The platform is based on a modified Bombardier Global 6000 business jet. The programme is a joint effort between Turkish Aerospace Industries (TUSAŞ) and ASELSAN. TUSAŞ is responsible for aircraft modification and certification, while ASELSAN develops the electronic warfare suite, which includes wideband receivers, digital radio frequency memory (DRFM) jammers, and signal processing systems. A total of 4 aircraft are planned. As of 2025, ground testing has been largely completed and flight testing is underway. The first aircraft is scheduled for delivery in 2026, with final delivery expected in 2028. In addition to its primary electronic attack role, the system is planned to have signals intelligence (SIGINT) and electronic intelligence (ELINT) capabilities. The aircraft is capable of operating at altitudes of up to approximately 51,000 feet (15,500 m).

=== Other aircraft ===
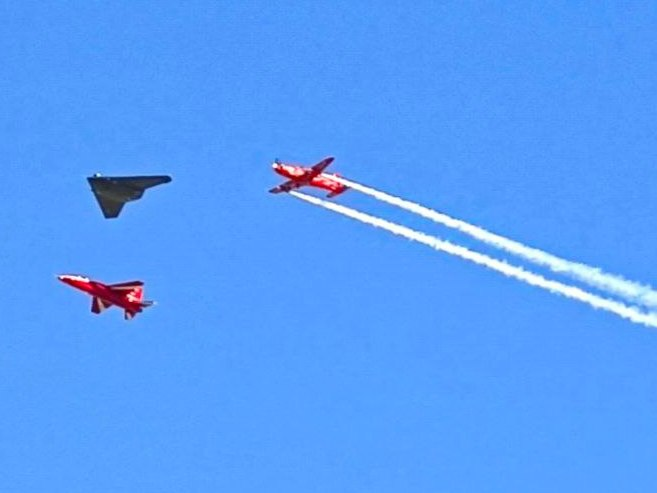
TAI Anka-3 (center) flying in formation with a TAI Hürjet (left) and a TAI Hürkuş (right) in 2024

Initially, 15 TAI Hürkuş were acquired by the Air Force but later they were decommissioned for export. The advanced basic trainer Hürkuş 2 is a newly developed model of the aircraft developed from the previous B variant and is expected to enter Turkey's inventory after 2025. 55 aircraft were ordered.

=== Unmanned aerial vehicles (UAVs / UCAVs) ===
As of 2023, the Turkish Air Force operates HALE UCAVs such as the Baykar Akıncı, and MALE UCAVs such as the TAI Aksungur, TAI Anka, Baykar Bayraktar TB2 and the IAI Heron. Baykar Bayraktar TB3 is the carrier-based naval version of the TB2. Baykar Kızılelma, a jet-powered, low-observable UCAV, is developed for the Turkish Air Force and Turkish Naval Forces; its maiden flight was successfully completed on 14 December 2022. Having been unable to purchase the armed version of Predator UCAVs from the United States, Turkey has fitted these drones with indigenous MAM series munitions, while the Baykar Akıncı HALE UCAV can also be armed with the SOM cruise missile.

The runway tests of TAI Anka-3, a jet-powered, flying wing type UCAV with stealth technology, began in April 2023. Its maiden flight was successfully completed on 28 December 2023. On October 30, 2024, a TAI Anka-3 UCAV armed with a cruise missile became the first drone in history to be controlled by another aircraft in the loyal wingman role, representing an advancement in remote control capabilities for military aviation. On 13 January 2025, a TAI Anka-3 successfully completed a strike mission test with internal munitions such as the Tolun bomb.

=== Satellites ===
As of 2024, the Turkish Air Force operates the military intelligence satellites Göktürk-2 (in orbit since 2012), Göktürk-1 (since 2016), and Türksat 5A (since 2021), while Göktürk-3 is scheduled to be launched and placed into orbit in 2025. Göktürk-2 is a 2m resolution reconnaissance satellite for use by the National Intelligence Organization, launched in 2012. Göktürk-1 is a 0.8m resolution reconnaissance satellite for use by the Turkish Armed Forces, launched in 2016. Some electro-optical parts that were required for the Göktürk-1 (0.8m resolution) satellite were beyond TAI's technological know-how, thus a foreign partner was sought. The official bidders for the project were EADS Astrium (U.K.), OHB-System (Germany) and Telespazio (Italy); and the contract was won by Telespazio of Italy.

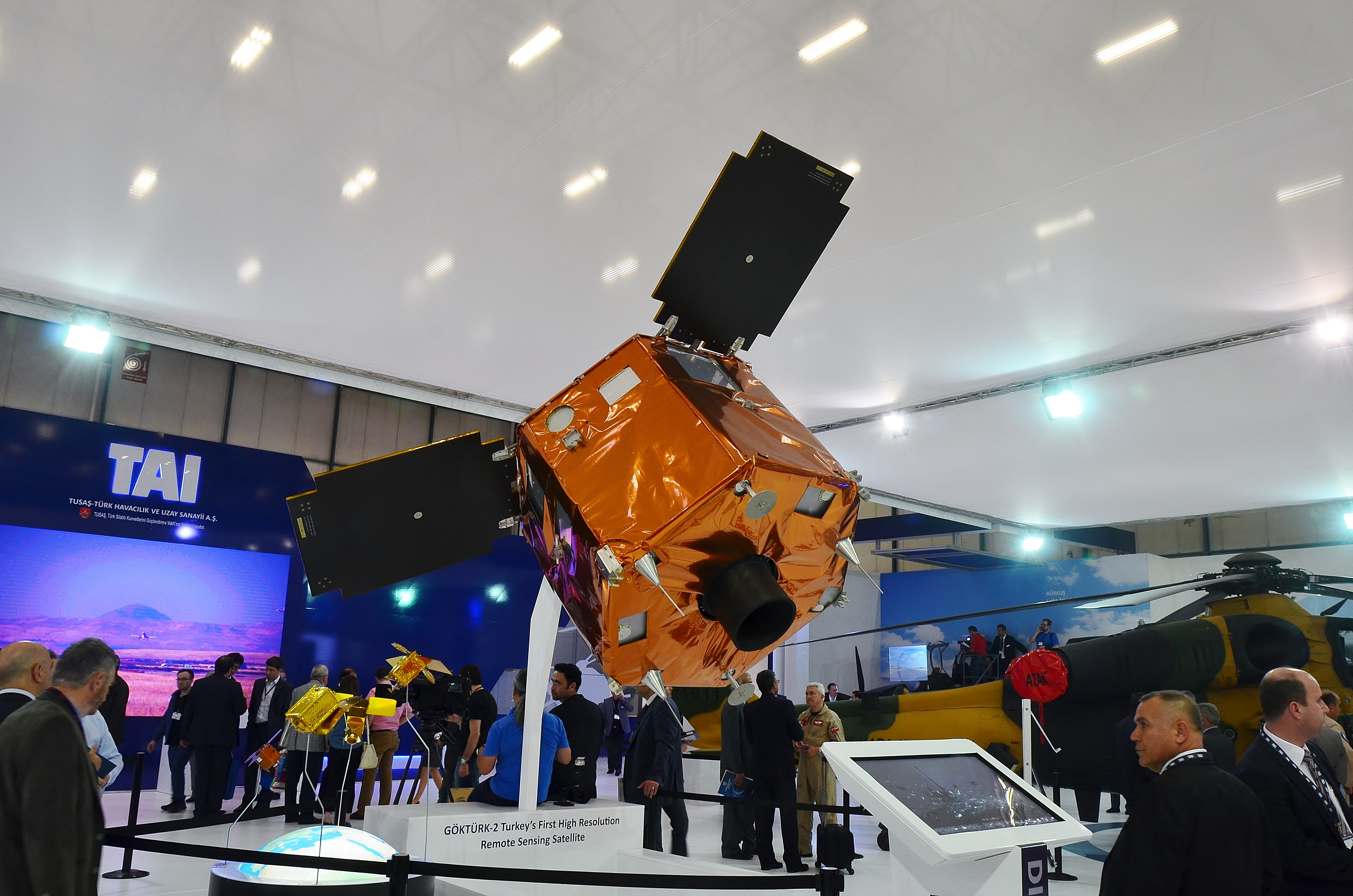
Model of Göktürk-2 at IDEF 2015

Göktürk-2 was launched from the Jiuquan Launch Area 4 / SLS-2 in China by a Long March 2D space launch vehicle at 16:12:52 UTC on 18 December 2012. It was placed into a low Earth orbit of 686 km (426 mi) at 16:26 UTC. The first signal from Göktürk-2 was received at 17:39 UTC by the Tromsø Satellite Station, northern Norway.

Göktürk-1 was launched later, after numerous delays due to political and business disputes, at 13:51:44 UTC on 5 December 2016, from the Guiana Space Center, on Vega flight VV08 of the European Space Agency's Vega rocket.

In 2013 Turkey approved the construction by Roketsan of its first satellite launching center, initially for low earth orbit satellites.

In 2015, Turkey and Ukraine signed a space program cooperation agreement worth billions of dollars.

Türksat 5A was launched on 8 January 2021, at 02:15:00 UTC from Cape Canaveral (CCSFS), SLC-40. It greatly extended the range of drone operations from the west of Europe to the east of Kazakhstan, with more resistance against jamming, rejection and wiretapping; high-definition live streams of targets and commanding of munitions drops.

=== Air defense ===
Air defense consists mostly of licensed productions like Oerlikon cannons and locally designed systems such as SIPER.

The United States has imposed Countering America’s Adversaries Through Sanctions Act (CAATSA) sanctions on Turkey for purchasing an S-400 air-and-missile defence system from Russia, after their official request to procure MIM-104 Patriot systems were declined.

=== Future equipment ===
==== Eurofighter Typhoon ====
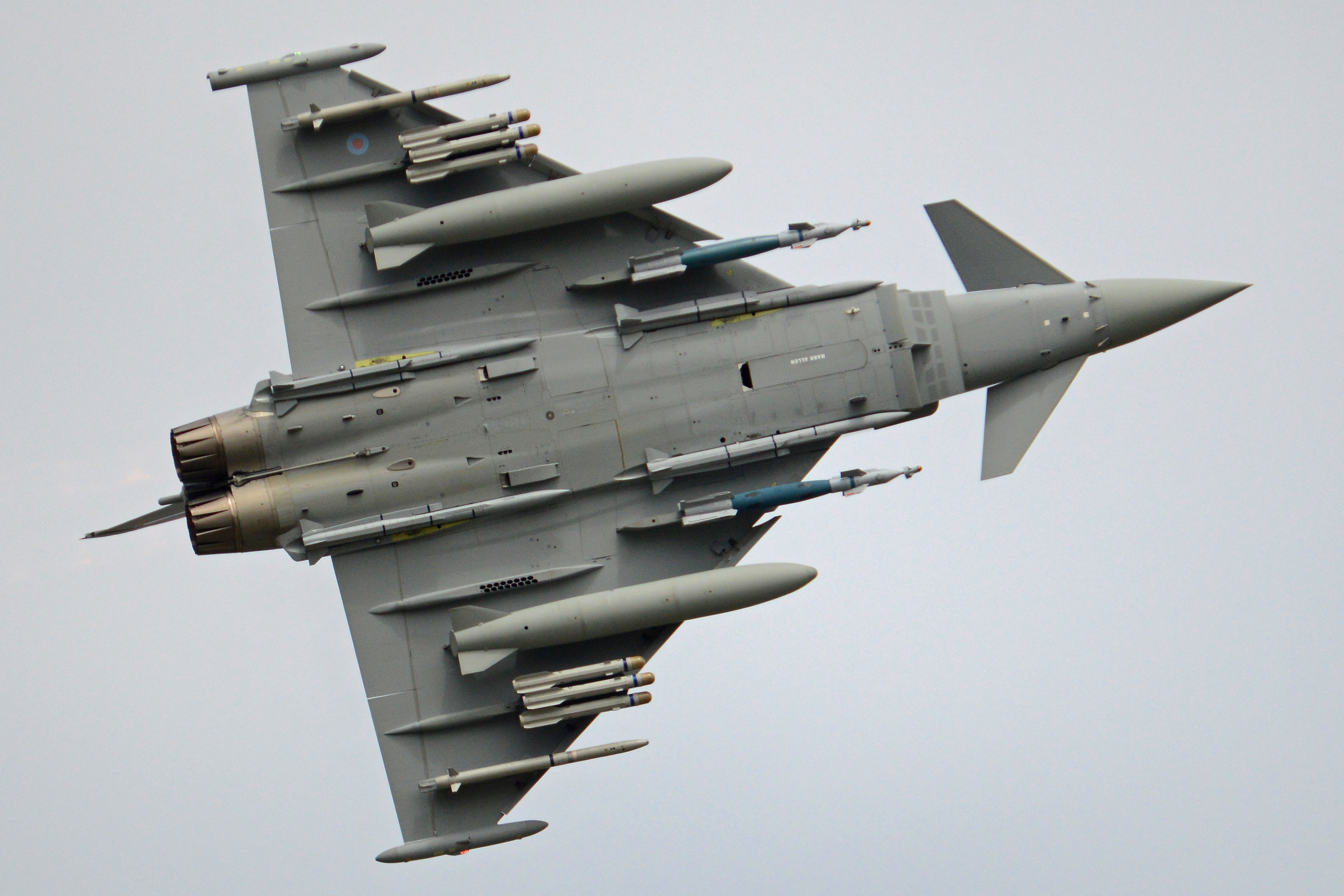
Eurofighter Typhoon

On October 27, 2025, Turkish president Recep Tayyip Erdoğan signed an £8 billion ($10.7 billion) deal with British prime minister Keir Starmer to purchase 20 new Eurofighter Typhoon Tranche 5 ECRS Mk2 fighter aircraft, produced by Eurofighter Jagdflugzeug GmbH. According to the Turkish Presidency's Directorate of Communications, the agreement also includes an option for 20 additional aircraft. According to the UK, the first batch will be delivered in 2030. Turkey has also formally proposed to purchase 12 Eurofighter Typhoon Tranche 3A aircraft from the Qatari Air Force (half of its current fleet of 24 Typhoon T3As) and another 12 aircraft of the same type from the Omani Air Force (all of its current fleet of 12 Typhoon T3As); which, if realized, would bring the total number to 44.

==== Project MMU ====
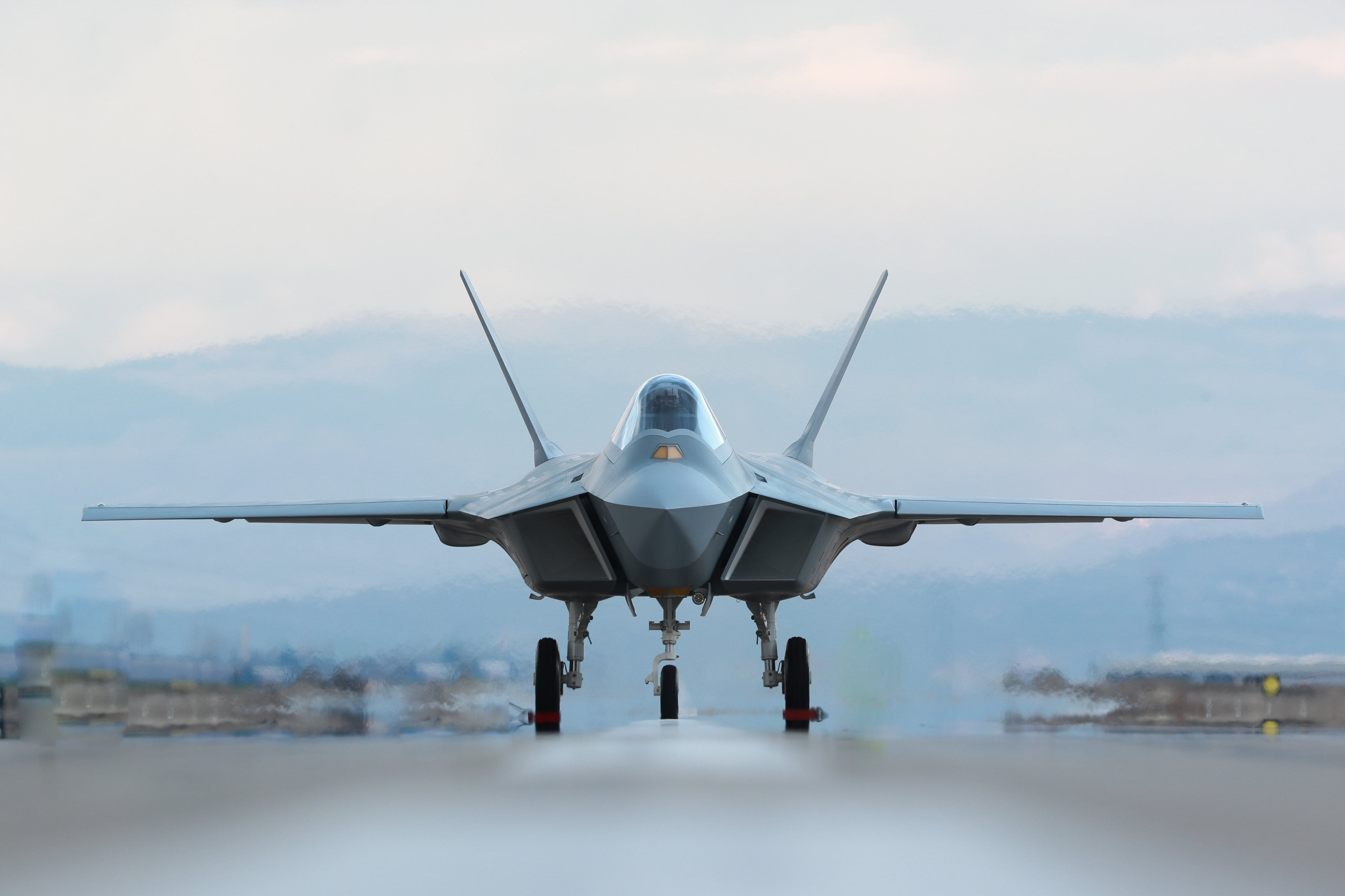
TAI Kaan completed its first flight on 21 February 2024

In December 2010, Turkey's Undersecretariat for Defense Industries signed an agreement with TAI for a fifth generation fighter aircraft to ultimately replace the F-16 Fighting Falcon on a project called MMU (Milli Muharip Uçak, Turkish for "National Combat Aircraft"). In June 2021, the Turkish Air Force made an official presentation of the TF-X program to the media, which later became known as the TAI TF Kaan. The aircraft is designed and developed as a low-observable, twin-engine, all-weather air superiority fighter by TAI and BAE Systems as its sub-contractor. The TAI TF Kaan is planned to complement and eventually replace the F-16s of the Turkish Air Force and to be exported to foreign nations. The runway tests of the prototype began on 16 March 2023. The aircraft's maiden flight was successfully completed on 21 February 2024 and second flight was completed successfully on 6 May 2024.

==== Project MIUS ====
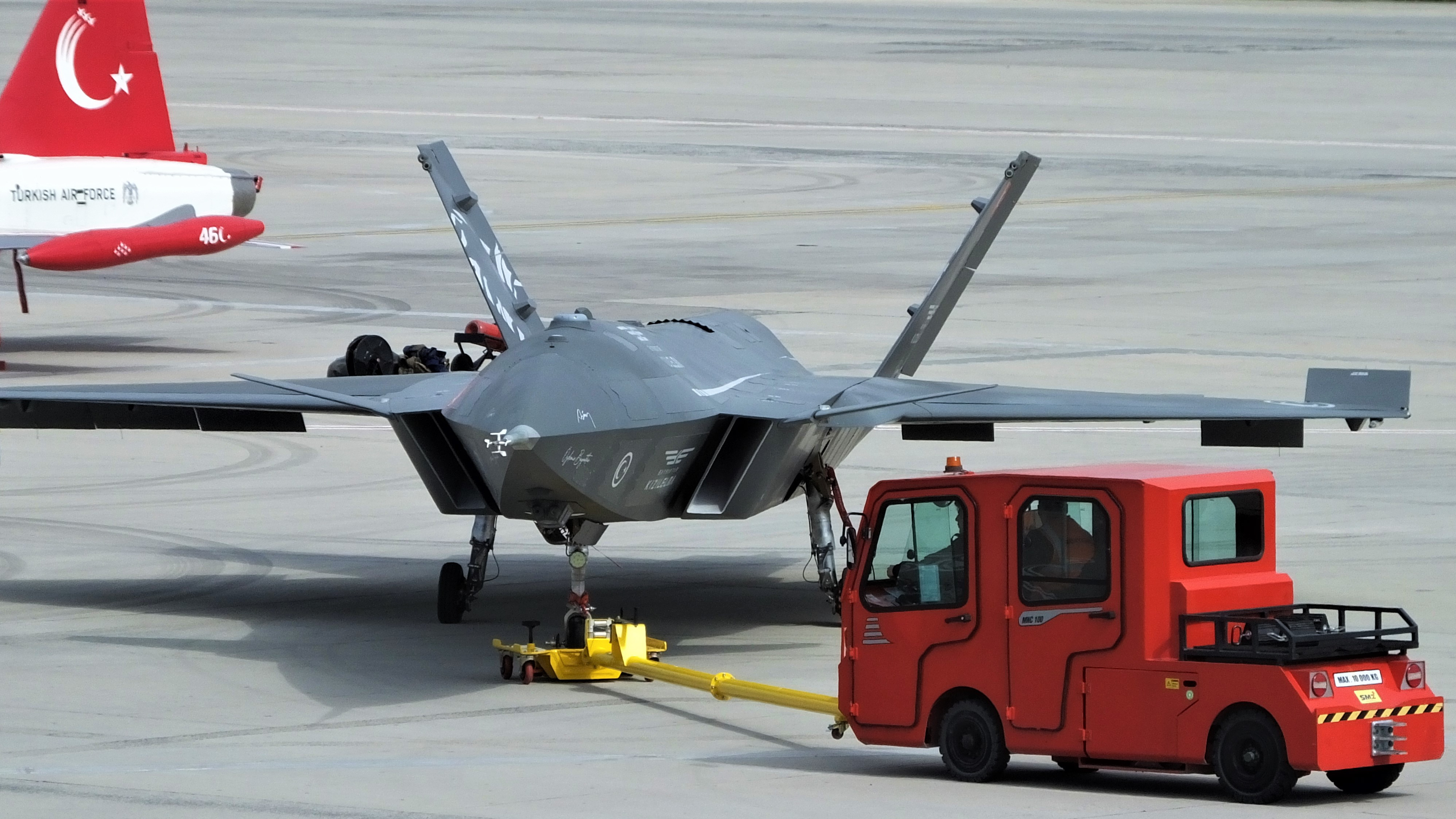
Bayraktar Kızılelma is a jet-powered UCAV developed for the Turkish Air Force and Turkish Navy.

Bayraktar Kızılelma fighter drone and the flying wing type TAI Anka-3 strike drone are the two jet-powered, low-observable UCAVs developed as part of Project MIUS.

Bayraktar Kızılelma, developed as part of Project MIUS (Turkish: Muharip İnsansız Uçak Sistemi "Combatant Unmanned Aircraft System"), completed its first flight on 14 December 2022, while TAI Anka-3 completed its first flight on 28 December 2023.

==== Project Hürjet ====
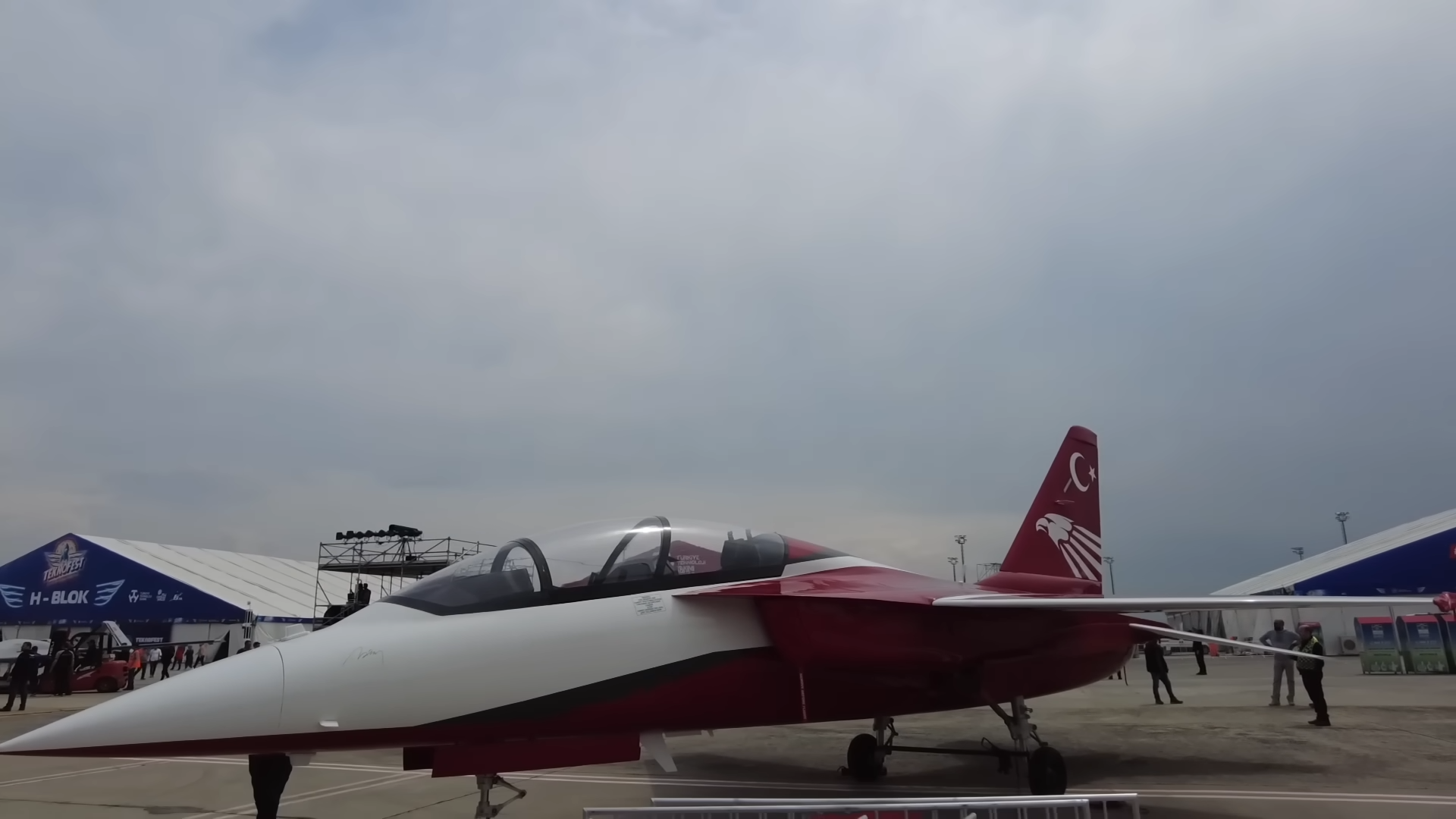
A TAI Hürjet at Teknofest 2023

An advanced jet trainer named the TAI Hürjet is under development, and is planned to start replacing the T-38 Talon and CF5 by 2025. The prototype made its first flight on 25 April 2023. Four Block 0 prototypes and twelve Block 1 mass production aircraft have been ordered.

== Structure ==
Prior to 2014, combatant units of the Turkish Air Force were organized under numbered 1st and 2nd Air Forces, which were respectively responsible for the western and eastern airspace. They were later unified into centralized Combatant Air Force and Air Defense Commands, which both are located in Eskişehir. 4th Main Jet Base Command was closed following the 2016 Turkish coup attempt and is now used as a temporary airfield for the Air Force.

=== Chief of Staff of the Turkish Air Force ===
- Personnel Directorate
- Intelligence Directorate
- Operations Directorate
- Logistics Directorate
- Defense Plan and Project Management Directorate
- Communications, Electronics and Information Systems Directorate
- Evaluation and Inspection Directorate
- Reconnaissance Satellites Command
- Space Command
- Air and Space Force Development Center

=== Combatant Air Force ===
1st Main Jet Base Command (Eskişehir)

- 111th Squadron "Panthers"
- 113th Squadron "Gazelles" (Reconnaissance)
- 401st Test Squadron
- 311th UCAV OSEM Squadron "Peak" (Command & control)
- Flight Health Research & Training Center

3rd Main Jet Base Command (Konya)

- 131st Squadron "Dragon" (AEW&C)
- 132nd Weapons & Tactics Squadron "Daggers"
- 134th Squadron "Turkish Stars" (Demo Team)
- 135th Squadron "Fire" (S&R)

4th Main Jet Base Command (Ankara)

- 403st Air Force Research Center Command "ARMERKOM"

5th Main Jet Base Command (Amasya)

- 151st Squadron "Vultures" (SEAD)
- 203rd Squadron "Angel" (S&R)

6th Main Jet Base Command (Balıkesir)

- 161st Squadron "Eagle-Bat" (LANTIRN)
- 162nd Squadron "Harpoon"

8th Main Jet Base Command (Diyarbakır)

- 181st Squadron "Leopard" (LANTIRN)
- 182nd Squadron "Hawk" (Disbanded)
- 202nd Squadron "Orient" (S&R)

9th Main Jet Base Command (Balıkesir)

- 191st Squadron "Cobras"
- 192nd Squadron "Tigers" (Disbanded)
- 193rd F-16 Training Squadron "Öncel"

10th Main Jet Base Command (Incirlik)

- 101st Aerial Refueling Squadron "Asenas"
- 152nd Squadron "Raiders" (QRA)
- 302nd UCAV Squadron "Lightning"

14th Unmanned Aircraft Systems Command (Batman)

- 341st UCAV Squadron "Shadow"

16th Main Jet Base Command (Dalaman)

- 166th Squadron "Uçbey"

=== Air Defense Command ===
15th Missile Base Command (Istanbul)

- HAWK Group Command
  - Battalion Operations Center
  - 1st HAWK Squadron (12 launchers)
  - 2nd HAWK Squadron (12 launchers)
- S-400 Group Command (Ankara)
  - 1st S-400 Squadron "Victory"

=== Air Logistics Command ===
11th Air Transportation Main Base Command (Ankara)

- 211th Air Transportation Squadron "Voyager"
- 212th Special Squadron "Falcon" (VIP transport)

12nd Air Transportation Main Base Command (Kayseri)

- 221st Air Transportation Squadron "Esen"
- 222nd Air Transportation Squadron "Flame"

=== Air Training Command ===
2nd Main Jet Base Command (Izmir)

- 121st Squadron "Wasp"
- 122nd Squadron "Scorpion"
- 123rd Squadron "Palaz"
- 124th Standardized Squadron "Pioneer"
- 125th Transportation & Helicopter Training Squadron "Puma"

Air Technical Schools Command (Izmir)

- Aircraft Maintenance School
- Communications, Electronics and Information Systems School
- Air Engineering School
- Air Defense School
- Air Supply and Administrative School
- Air Transportation School
- Air Security School
- Ammunition Demolition School
- Operational Preparedness and Officer Development School
- Education Administrators and Teachers School

Liaison Squadron, Air Education Command (İzmir)

- 203rd Search and Rescue Squadron "Ege"

Air Force Recruit Training Brigade Command (Kütahya)

=== Geographic locations ===
Turkish Air Force bases 2024
Fighter bases: F-16C/D Falcon F-16C/D Falcon / F-4E 2020T Terminator Unmanned aerial vehicles
Training bases: F-16C/D Falcon T-38M Talon
Other bases: Missile bases Other flying units
Air-surveillance: Radar station Command and Control Center

=== Squadrons ===
The above commands consist of:

- 19 Combat squadrons
- 1 Reconnaissance squadron
- 6 Training squadrons
- 6 Transportation squadrons
- 1 Tanker squadron
- 8 Surface-to-air missile (SAM) squadrons

== Insignia ==
NATO code	OF-10	OF-9	OF-8	OF-7	OF-6	OF-5	OF-4	OF-3	OF-2	OF-1
Turkish Air Force
Turkish Air Force	Mareşal	Orgeneral	Korgeneral	Tümgeneral	Tuğgeneral	Albay	Yarbay	Binbaşı	Yüzbaşı	Üsteğmen	Teğmen	Asteğmen

NATO code	OR-9	OR-8	OR-7	OR-6	OR-5			OR-4		OR-3		OR-2	OR-1
Turkish Air Force													No insignia
Turkish Air Force	Astsubay kıdemli başçavuş	Astsubay başçavuş	Astsubay kıdemli üstçavuş	Astsubay üstçavuş	Astsubay kıdemli çavuş	Astsubay çavuş	Astsubay astçavuş	Uzman çavuş	Çavuş	Uzman onbaşı	Onbaşı		Er

- OF3, OF2, & OR2 translate to "Head of 1000", "Head of 100", and "Head of 10" respectively.

== Gallery ==
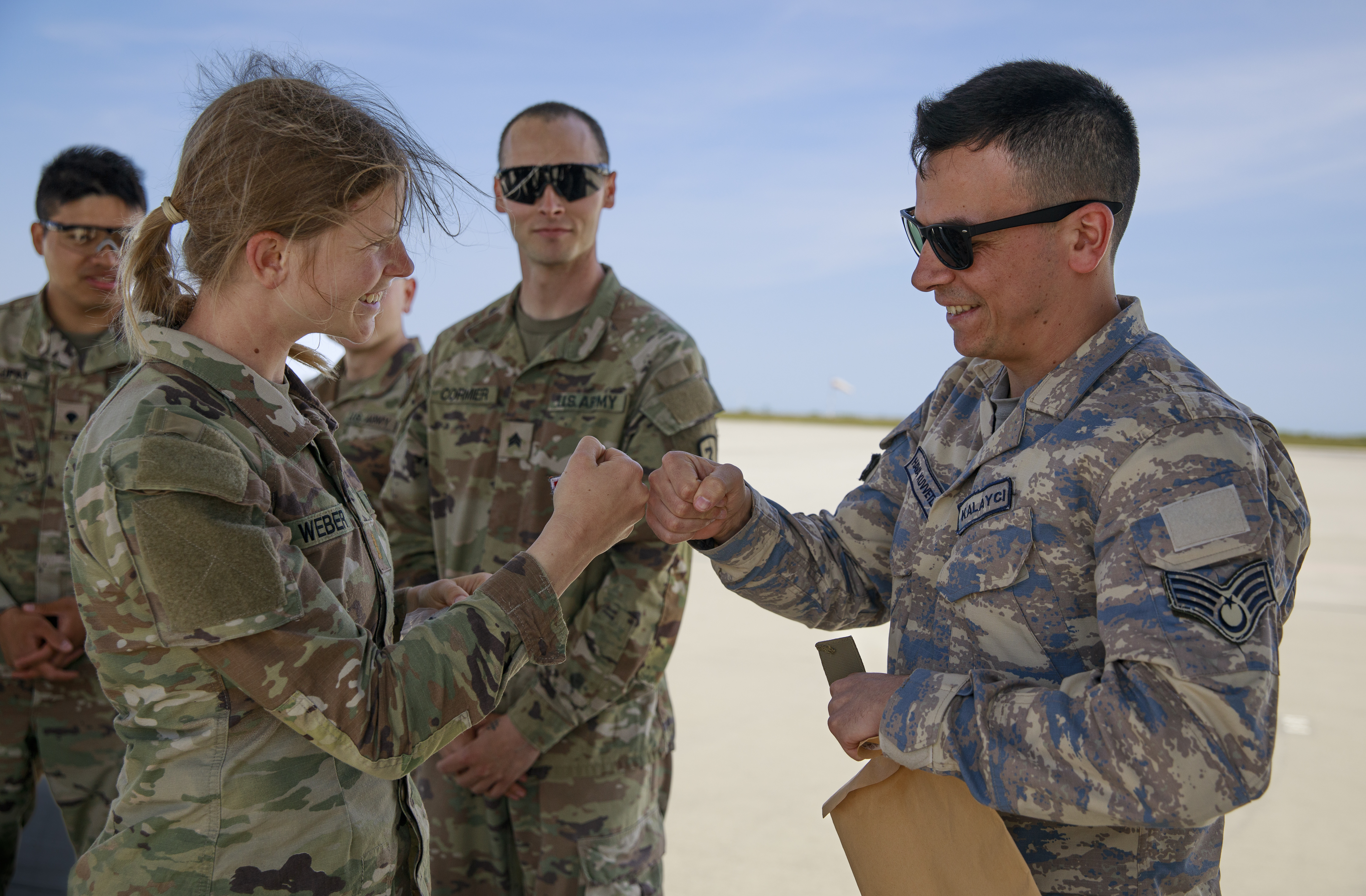
A U.S. Army second lieutenant and a Turkish Air Force NCO trade uniform patches during Defender 23

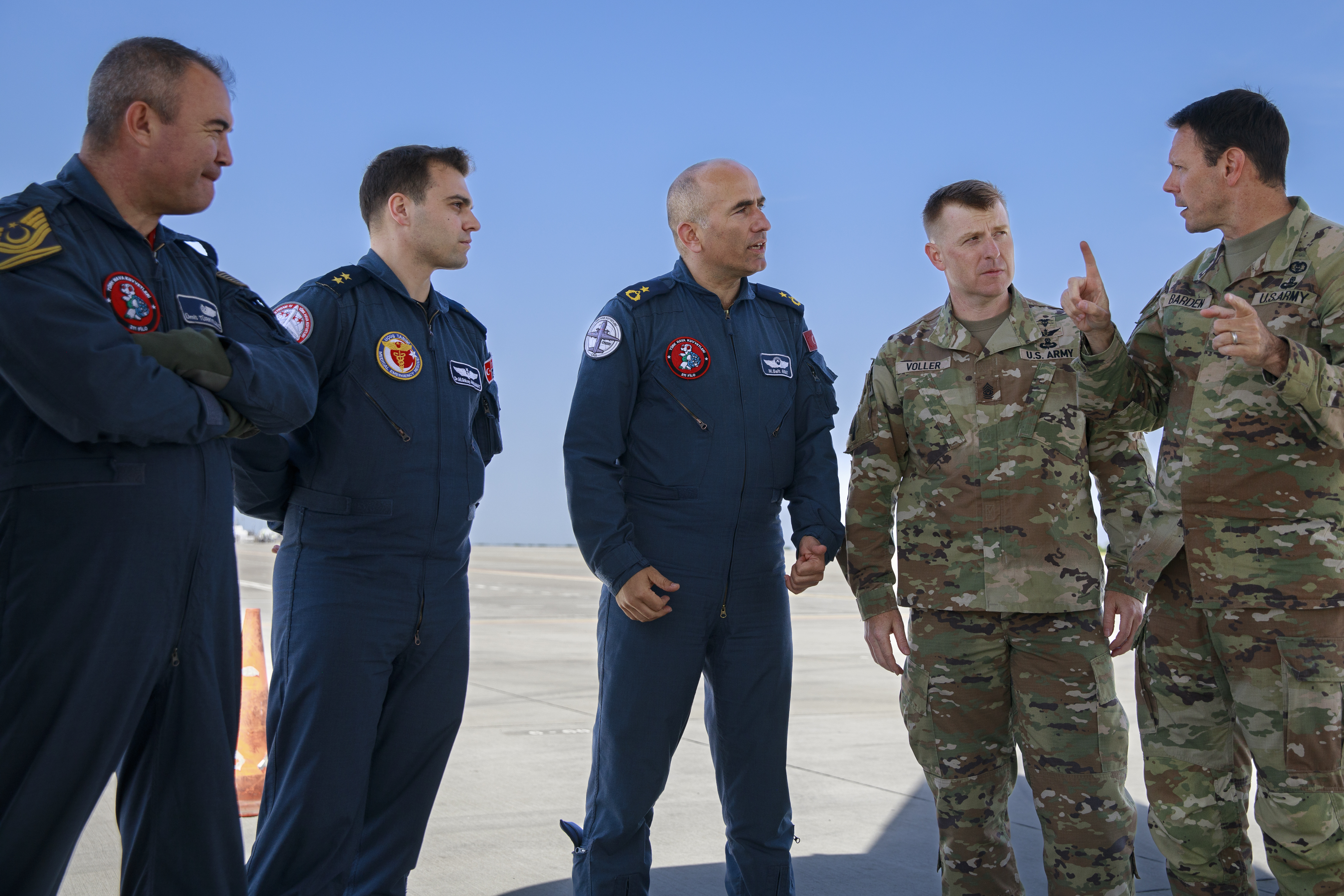
A U.S. Army colonel speaks with Turkish coalition partners during Defender 23

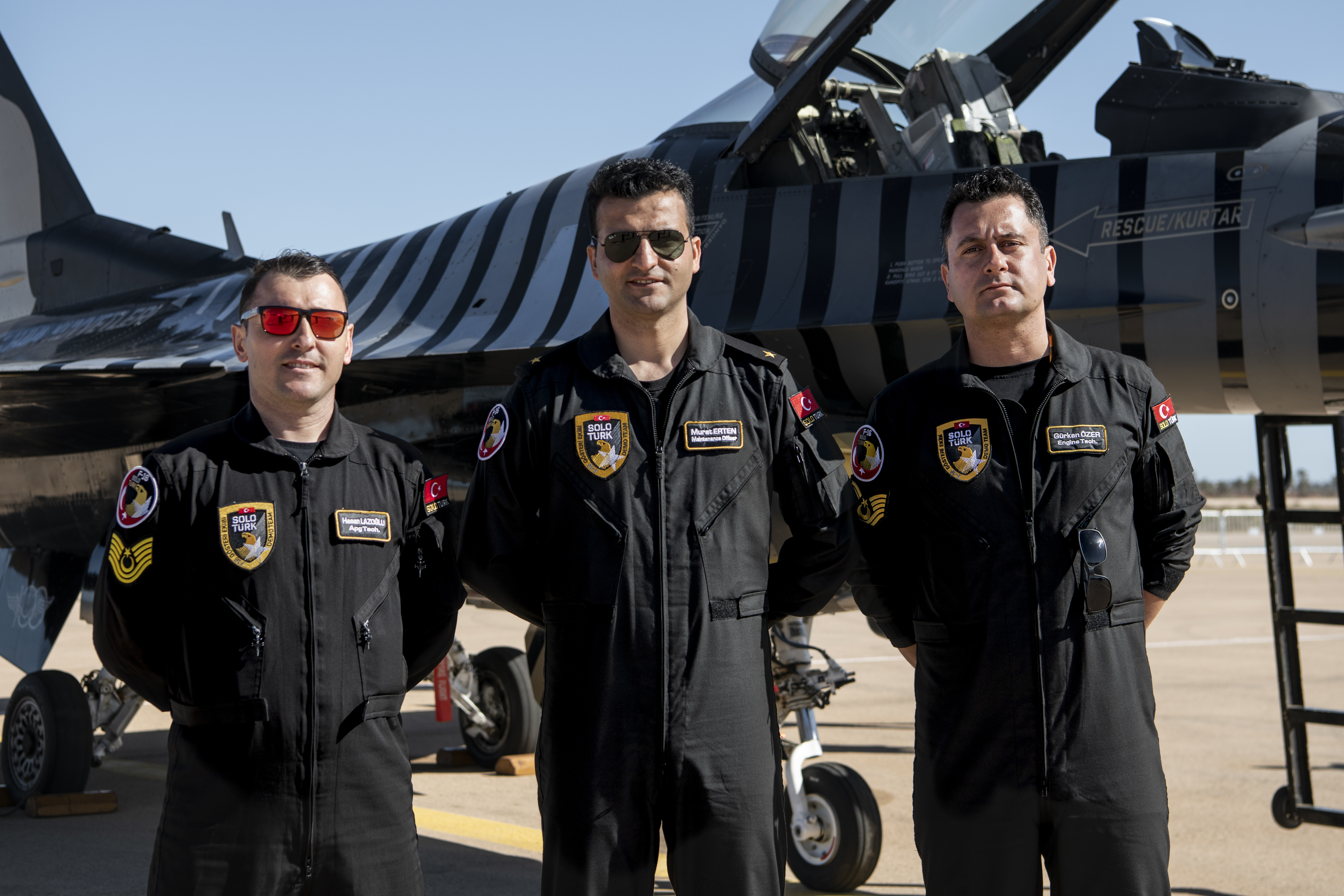
Solo Türk team pose for a photo during the Tunisia International Aerospace and Defense Exhibition

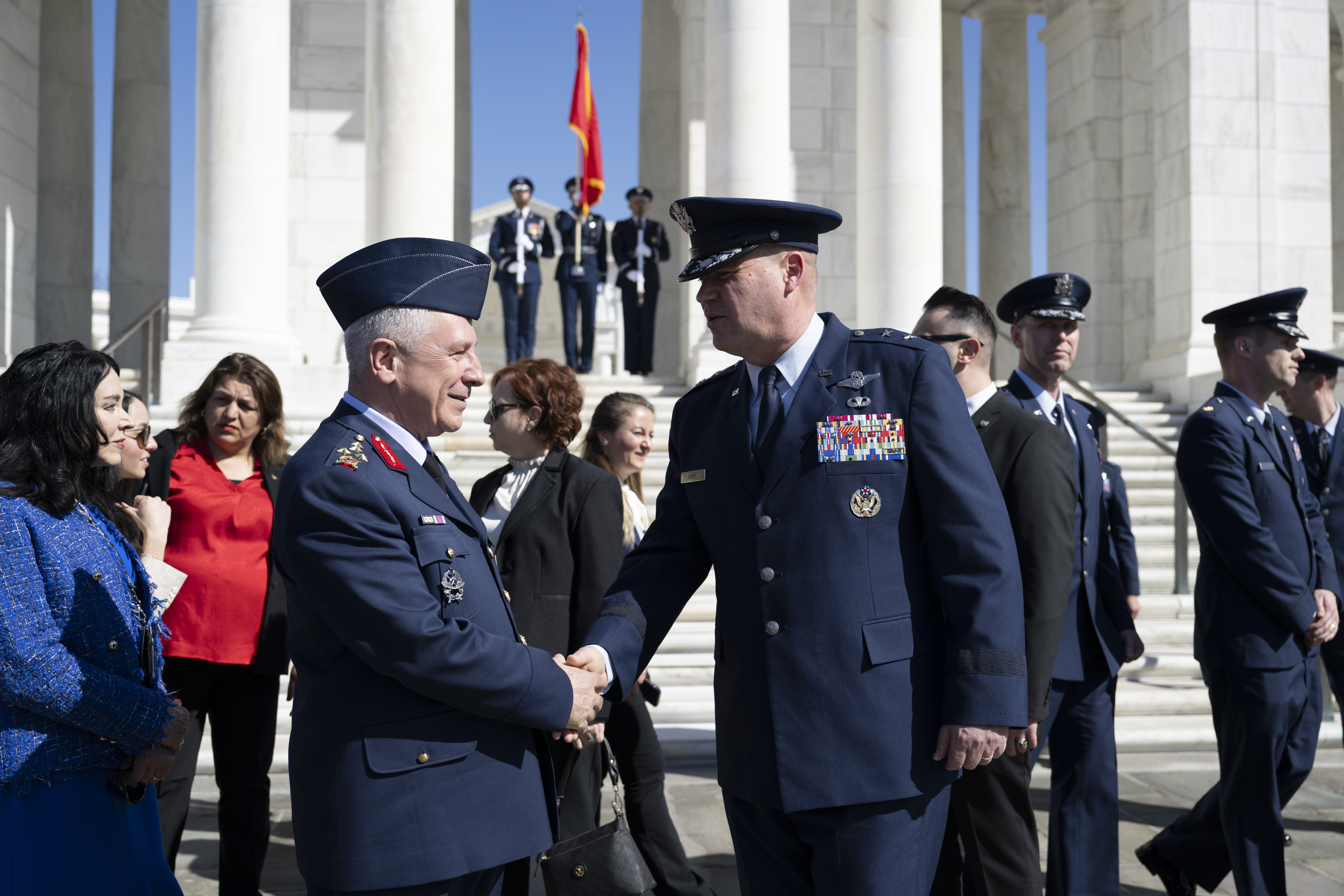
Commander of the Turkish Air Force Gen. Ziya Cemal Kadıoğlu (left) and Maj. Gen. Daniel DeVoe (right) at the Arlington National Cemetery in 2025

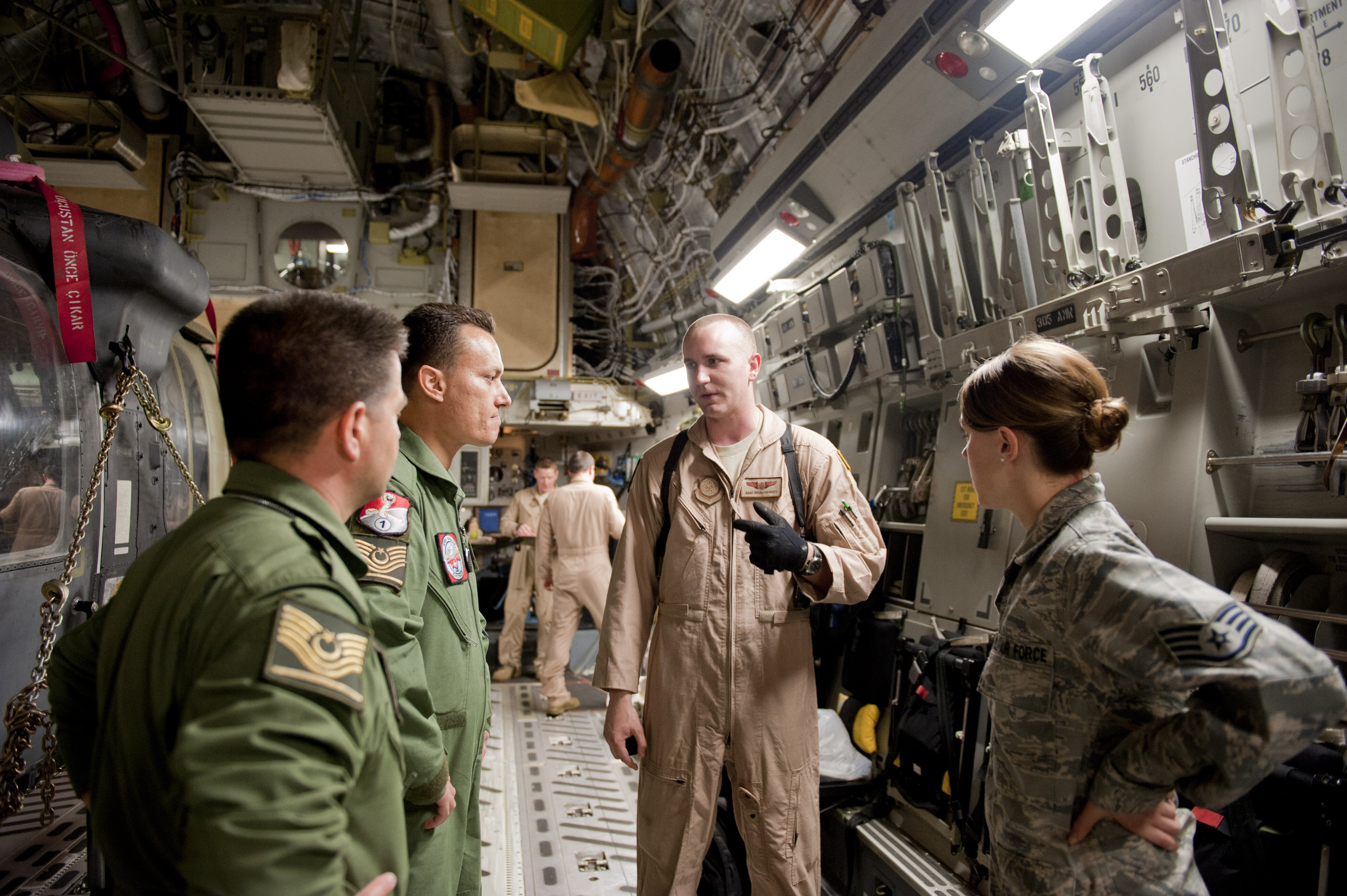
A U.S. staff sergeant gives a safety briefing to two Turkish Air Force UH-60 Black Hawk helicopter pilots

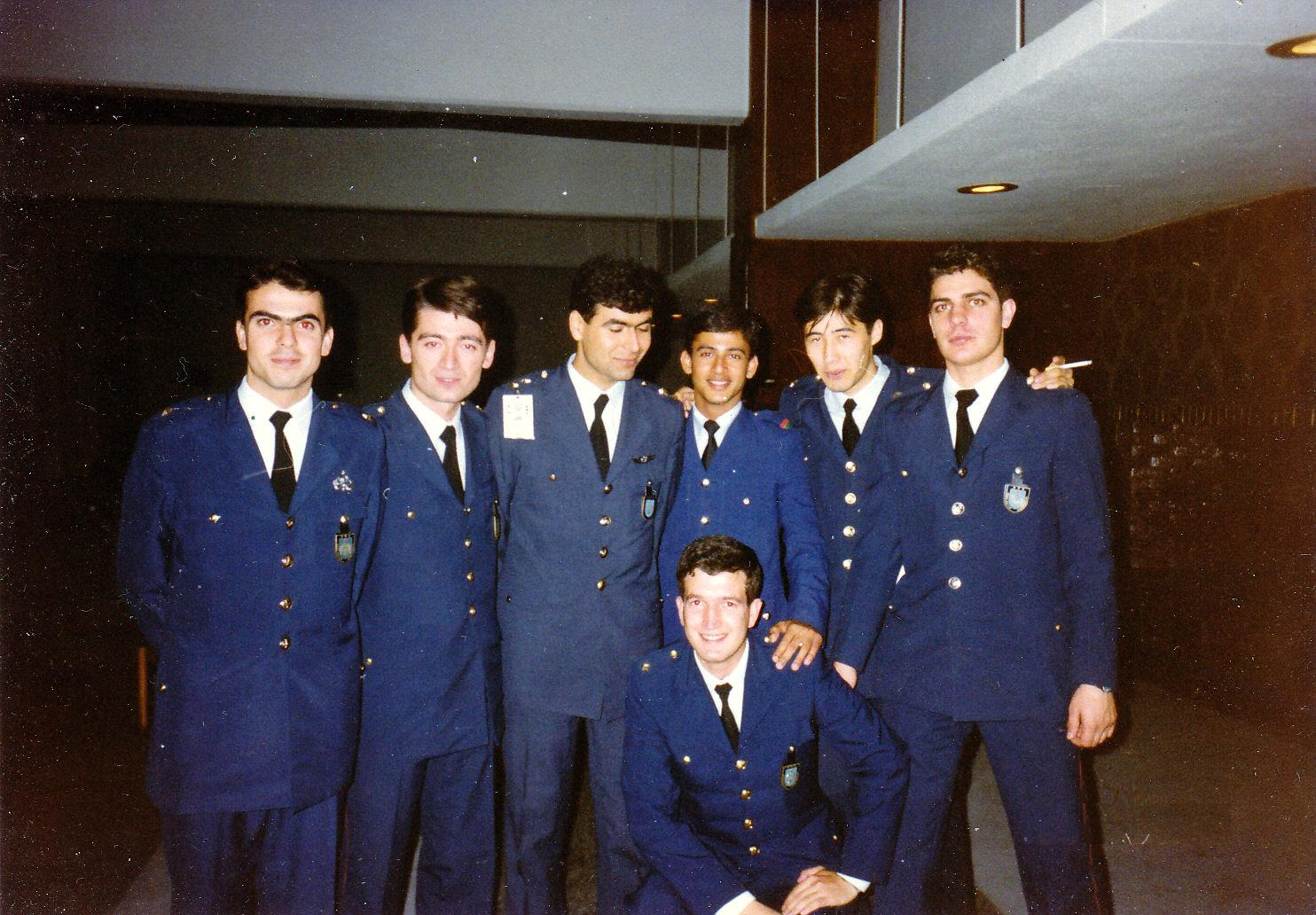
Air Force Academy cadets in the 1990s

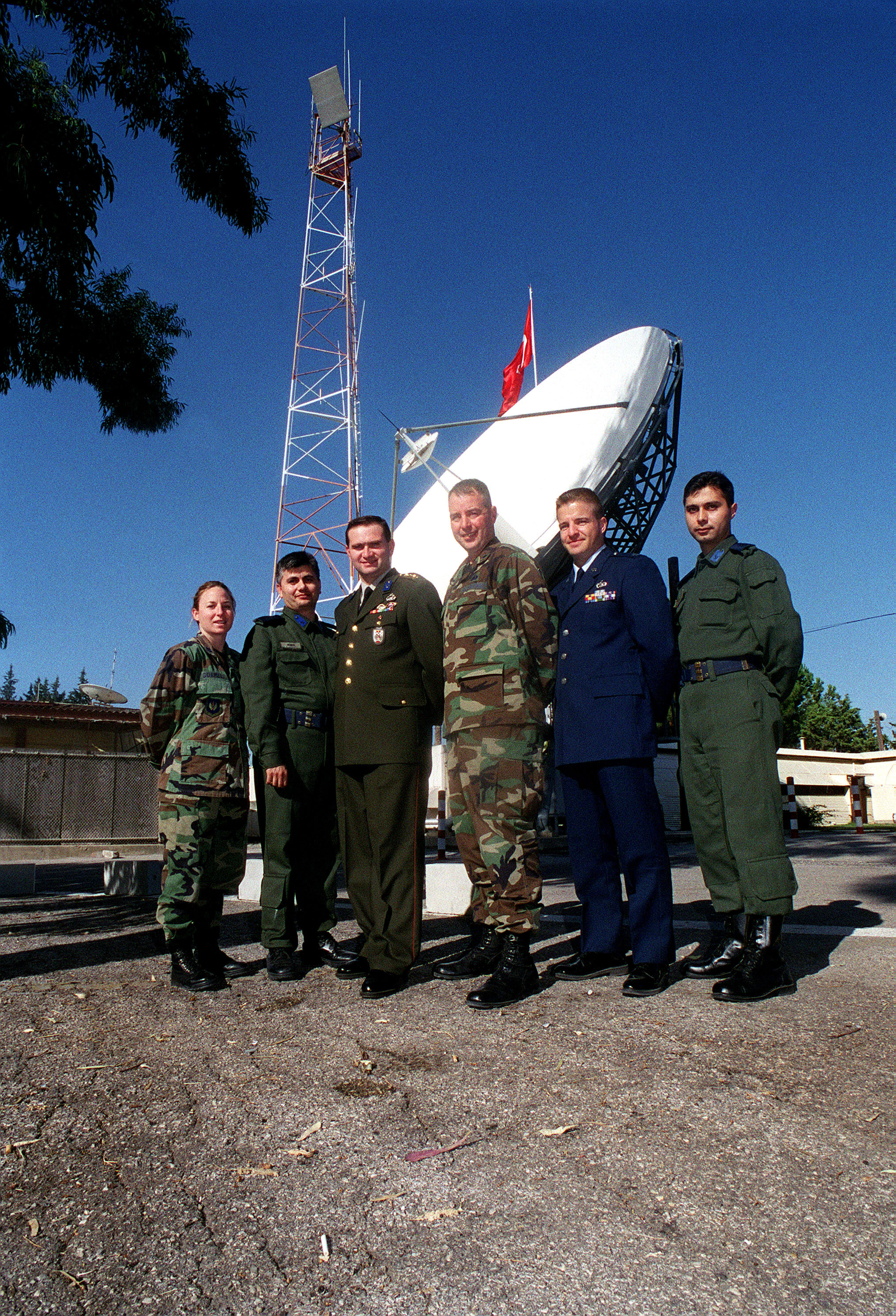
U.S. and Turkish airmen pose for a group photo during the Defense and Economic Cooperation Agreement inspection at Incirlik Air Base

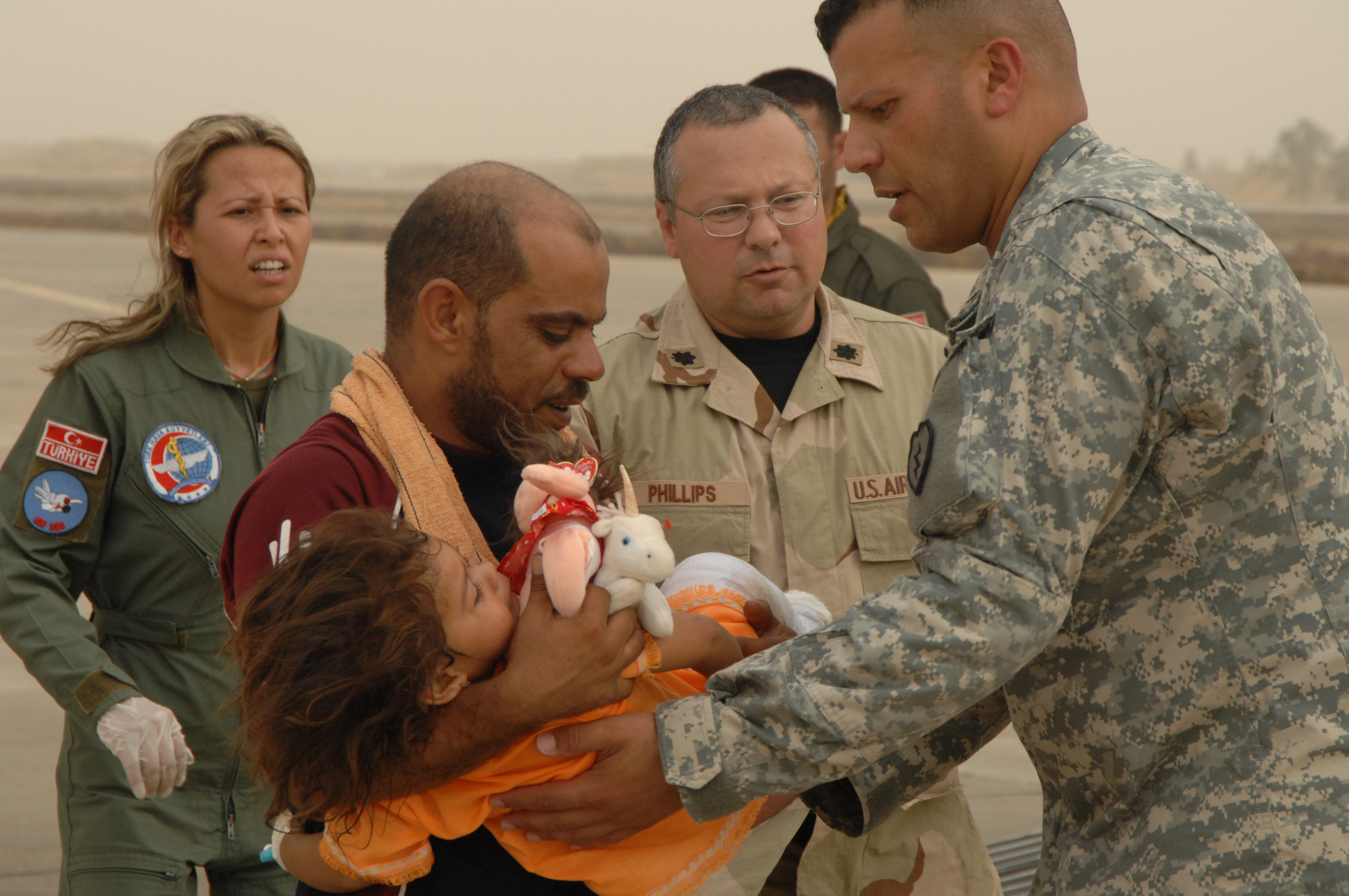
A U.S. Air Force airman, a U.S. Army soldier and a Turkish Air Force pilot transport an Iraqi child to safety during a humanitarian airlift effort

== See also ==
- Turkish Stars
- SoloTürk
- List of commanders of the Turkish Air Force
- List of chiefs of the Turkish General Staff
- Turkish Aeronautical Association

== Bibliography ==
- Morgan, Eric B. & Burnet, Charles (December 1981 – March 1982). "Walrus... Amphibious Angel of Mercy". Air Enthusiast (17): 13–25. ISSN 0143-5450.
