= 1st Main Jet Base Command =

Turkish Air Force unit

The 1st Main Jet Base Command is a Turkish Air Force unit affiliated to Combat Air Force and Air Missile Defense Command. It is located in Eskişehir. The 401st Test Fleet Command, is also located at this base where locally produced and developed weapons and ammunition are tested.
