= Ergin Dinç =

Lieutenant General Ergin Dinç
- Education: Turkish Air Force Academy
- Military career
- Allegiance: Turkey
- Branch: Turkish Air Force
- Rank: Lieutenant General

Ergin Dinç is a lieutenant general in the Turkish Air Force who serves as the Commandant of the Turkish Air Training Command. Before assuming his current position, Dinç served as the Commandant of the Turkish Air Force Academy and Chief of Staff of the Turkish Air Force.
