= Čaušić =

Čaušić is a Serbo-Croatian surname, derived from čauš, a borrowing of the Turkish word çavuş. It may refer to:

- Andrej Čaušić (born 1990), Croatian footballer
- Goran Čaušić (born 1992), Serbian footballer

== See also ==
- Čaušević, surname
- Čauševići, place name
