= Çavuşlu =

Çavuşlu is a Turkish place name and may refer to the following places in Turkey:

- Çavuşlu, Baskil
- Çavuşlu, Bayramiç
- Çavuşlu, Bismil
- Çavuşlu, Borçka, a village in Borçka district of Artvin Province
- Çavuşlu, Devrekani, a village in Turkey
- Çavuşlu, Giresun, a town in Görele district of Giresun Province
- Çavuşlu, Hopa, a village in Hopa district of Artvin Province
- Çavuşlu, Karataş, a village in Karataş district of Adana Province
- Çavuşlu, Tarsus, a village in Tarsus district of Mersin Province
