= Ceaușu =

Ceaușu may refer to:

- Ceaușu, the old name of the Râmnicelu village, Buzău County, Romania
- Alexandru Ceaușu (born 1980), Romanian sprint canoer who competed in the early to mid-2000s.
- Marin Ceaușu (1891–1954), Romanian Brigadier-General during World War II

== See also ==
- Ceaușescu (surname)
