= Standoff jammer =

Type of airborne electronic warfare system

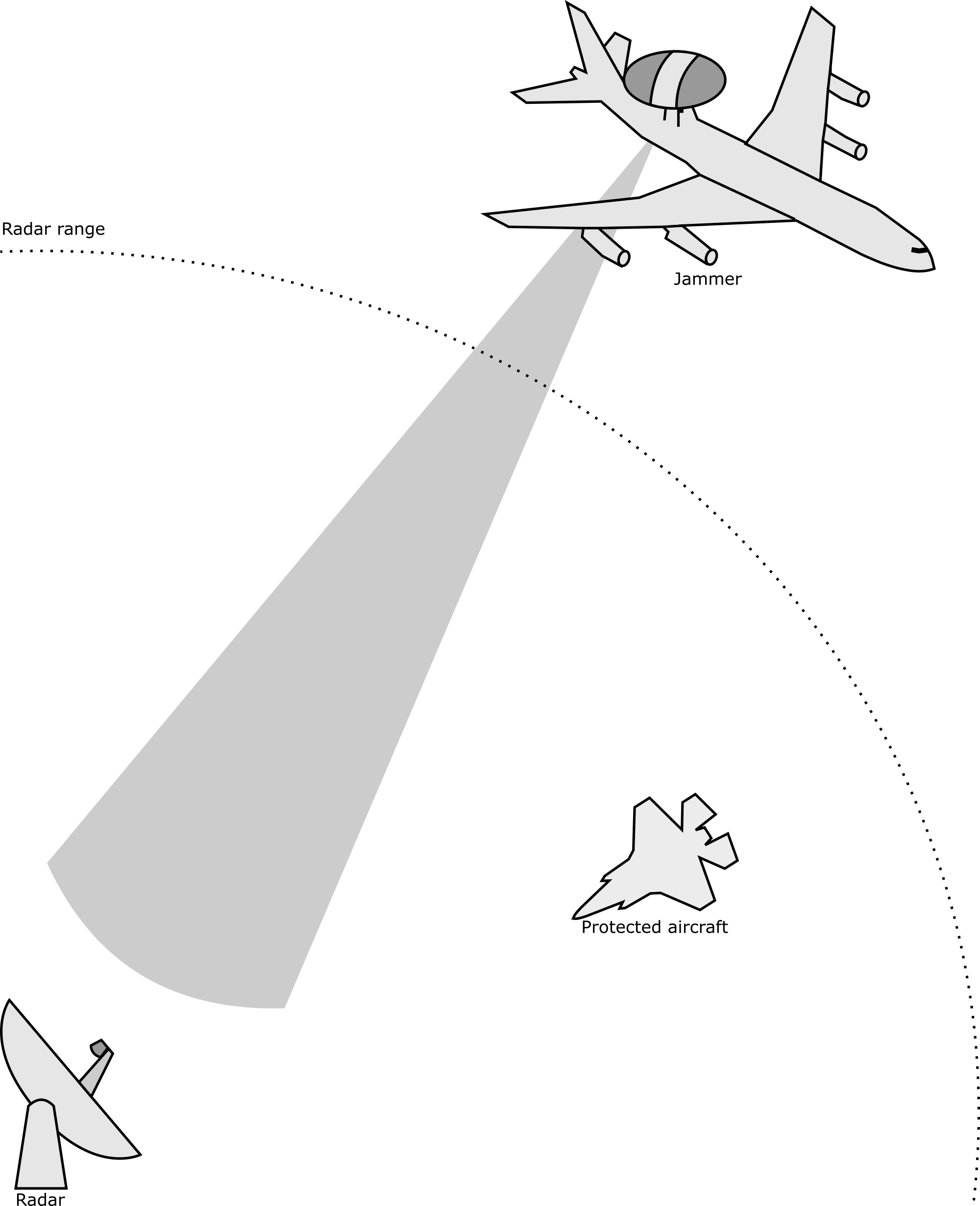
A diagram of protective stand-off jamming

A standoff jammer (SOJ) or air standoff jammer is a standoff weapon, an airborne electronic warfare system (jammer). Standoff jamming is a strategy whereby the jammer is positioned outside the defended airspace, detects and geolocates enemy radars and command links, and then attacks them electronically. The name reflects their operation while "standing off" outside the adversary range.

== See also ==
- Escort jamming
