= Defense industry of Turkey =

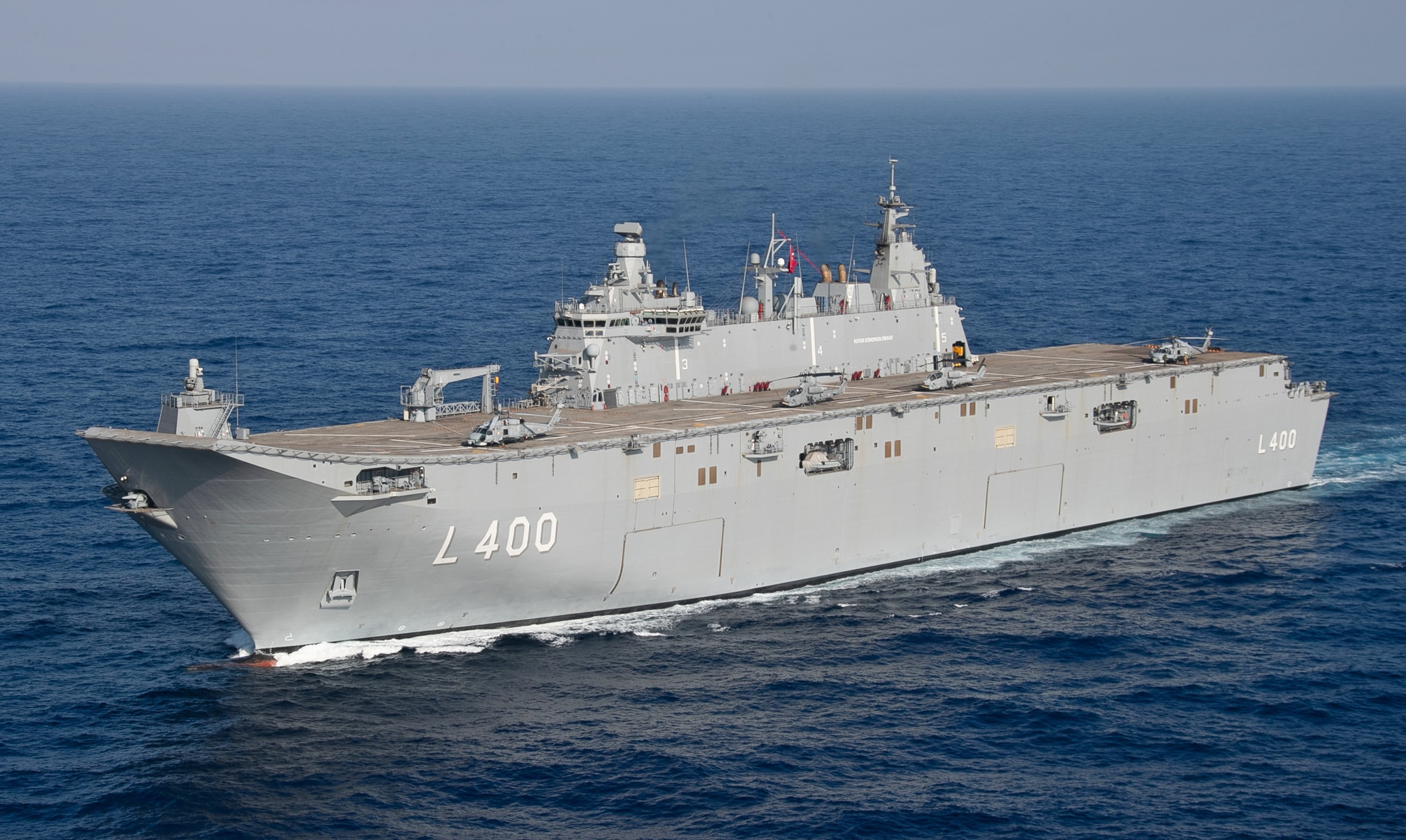
Turkish-built TCG Anadolu (L-400) amphibious assault ship (LHD and V/STOL aircraft carrier) in the Mediterranean Sea

The defense industry of Turkey has a long history, dated from the Ottoman Empire, and has changed several times during the Republic period. The Turkish defense industry has achieved significant growth with state support in line with the independence decision taken in the defense industry in 1974. The Turkish defense industry has gained great field experience with the operations of the Turkish Armed Forces in Iraq, Syria and Libya. This situation has attracted the attention of many countries, especially in Europe, and has led to cooperation with Turkey in the fields of defense and industry. Today, Turkey produces thousands of products in dozens of different areas, from infantry rifles to fifth-generation fighter jets. As of 2024, Turkey will meet more than 70 percent of its defense industry needs with domestic production. By 2025, Turkey's defense industry needs will have exceeded 80 percent of domestic needs and R&D spending will reach $3 billion annually. In 2024, there were 3,500 defense industry companies working on more than 1,100 projects in the country. In 2024, the Turkish defense industry's exports abroad exceeded $7 billion for the first time in history.

Turkish defense industry companies have made great progress in the field of aviation after 2010. Between 2013 and 2024, 9 military aircraft were produced and flown. Leading Turkish aircraft engine company TEI designed 13 engines in a 10-year period between 2014 and 2024. Flights were carried out with 7 of these engines. 6 of them entered mass production. Defence Industry Agency president Görgün announced that the number of employees in the defense sector is expected to be between 108 thousand and 110 thousand in 2025.

== Historical development ==
=== From Empire to Republic ===
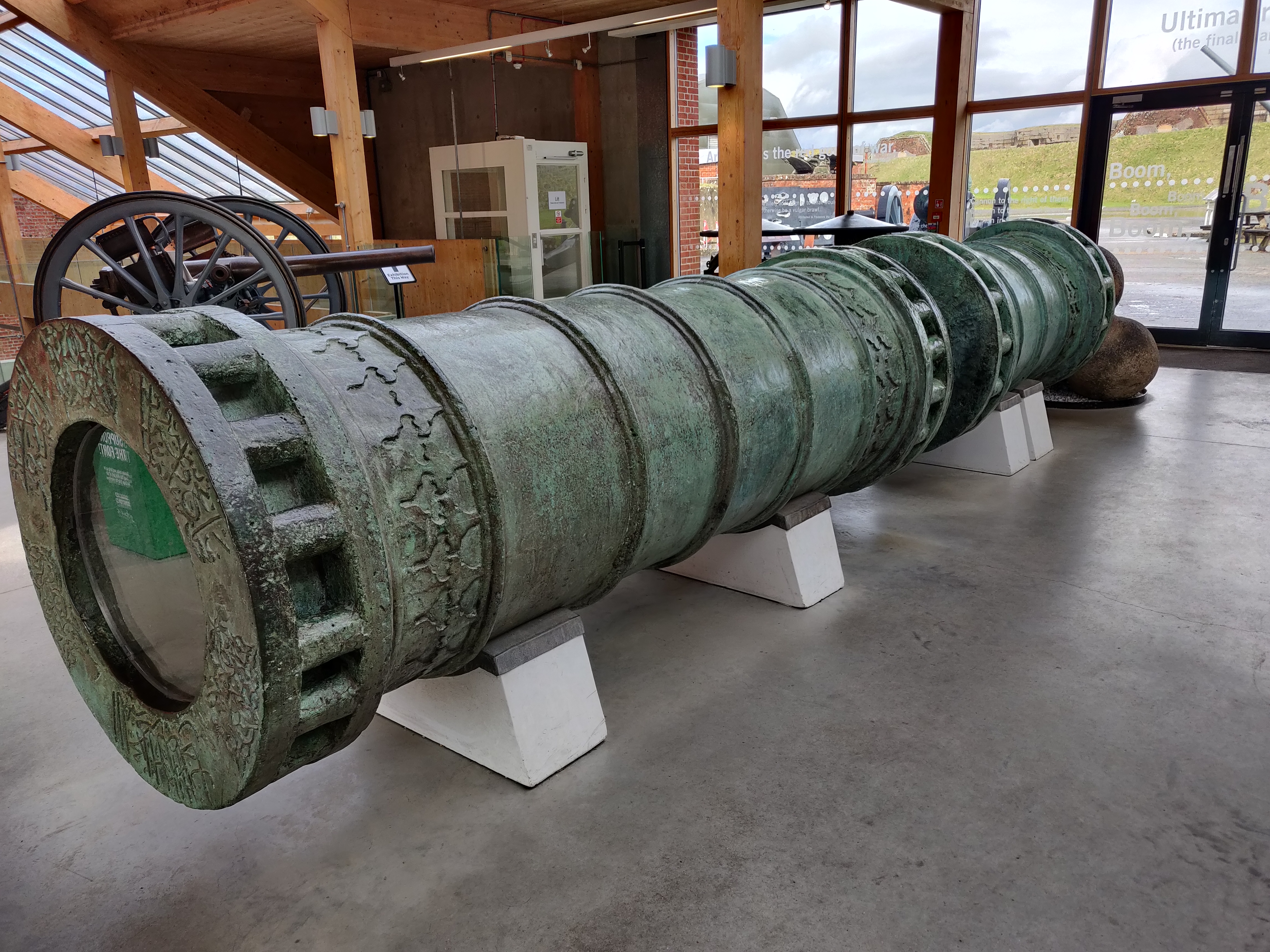
Dardanelles Gun made by Munir Ali, one of the Tophane-i Amire (Royal Arsenal) masters, 1464

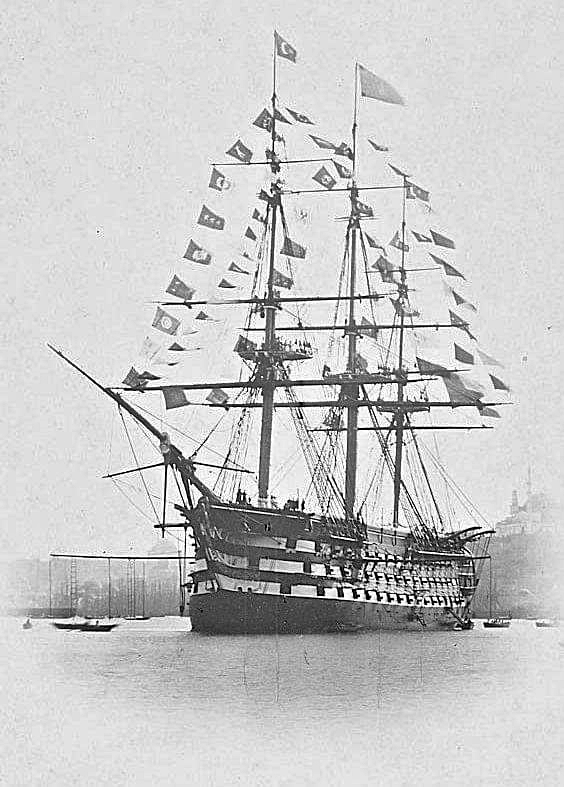
Mahmudiye (1829), built by the Imperial Naval Arsenal on the Golden Horn in Constantinople, was for many years the largest warship in the world. One of the world's few completed heavy first-rate battleships, she was a ship of the line with 128 guns on three decks, and participated in numerous naval battles.

The exact date when the Ottoman Turks started producing rifles and cannons is a matter of debate. However, it is known that cannons were used in the siege of Constantinople during the reign of Bayezid I. The large cannons made by the Turks in 1453 were mentioned by both the Turks and the Byzantines. In particular, the sound these cannons made when fired was described as frightening by the Byzantines. In the Battle of Mohács in 1526, the Turks lured the 30,000-strong Hungarian heavy cavalry into a trap consisting of a defense line of 300 cannons and in this way were able to destroy a large part of the Hungarian army in a period of 2 hours. Until the 18th century, Ottoman weapons facilities were in a position to compete with European states. However, radical technological changes and the industrial revolution that emerged from the end of the 18th century caused the gap between Europe and the Ottomans to widen rapidly. The Turkish manufacturing industry could not keep up with the rapid changes in cannon and rifle technology, and in many cases, it was preferred to purchase materials from abroad. Especially with the emergence of smokeless powder, rifled guns and armored ships, the technological gap between the Ottomans and Europe widened to an uncompetitive level.

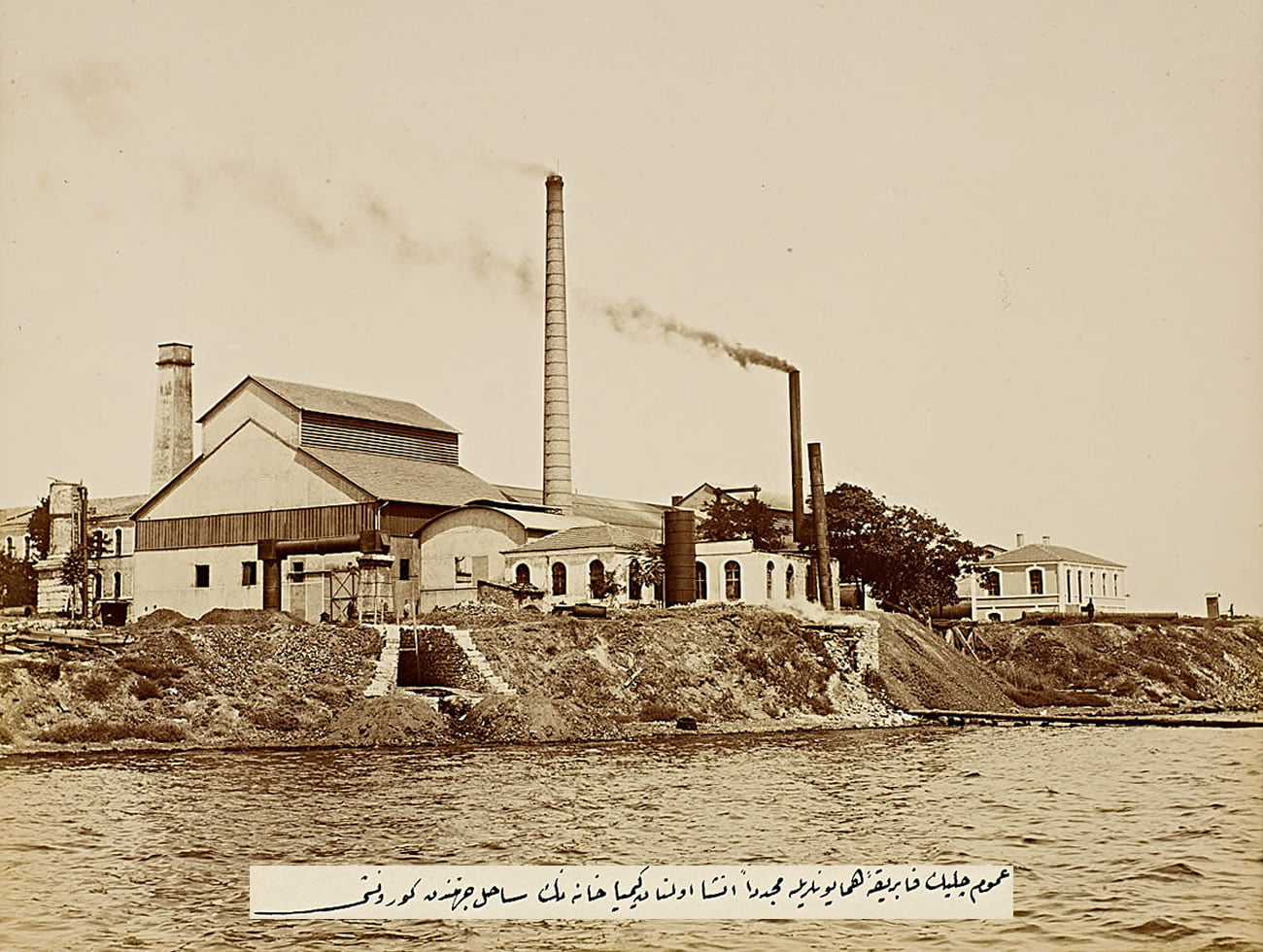
Zeytinburnu Iron Factory (1843-1930), Istanbul, 1880s

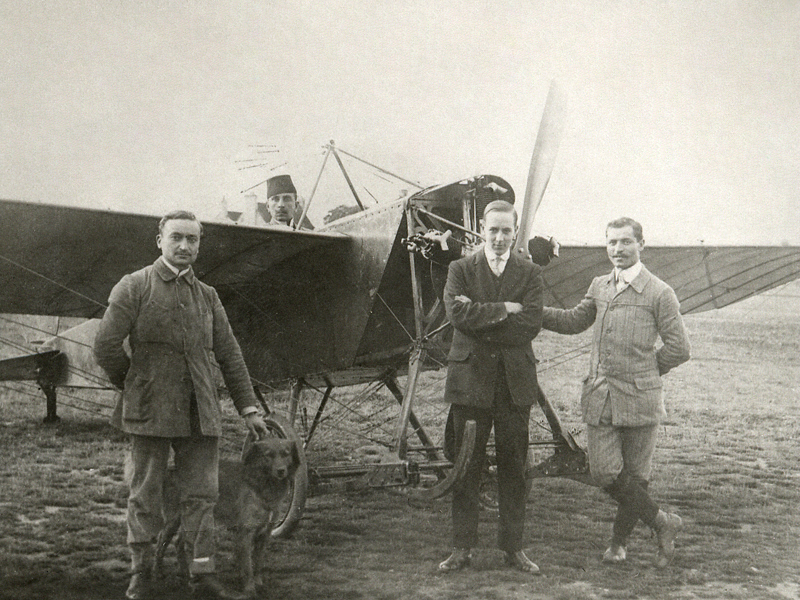
Ottoman Aviation Squadrons were military aviation units of the Ottoman Army and Navy

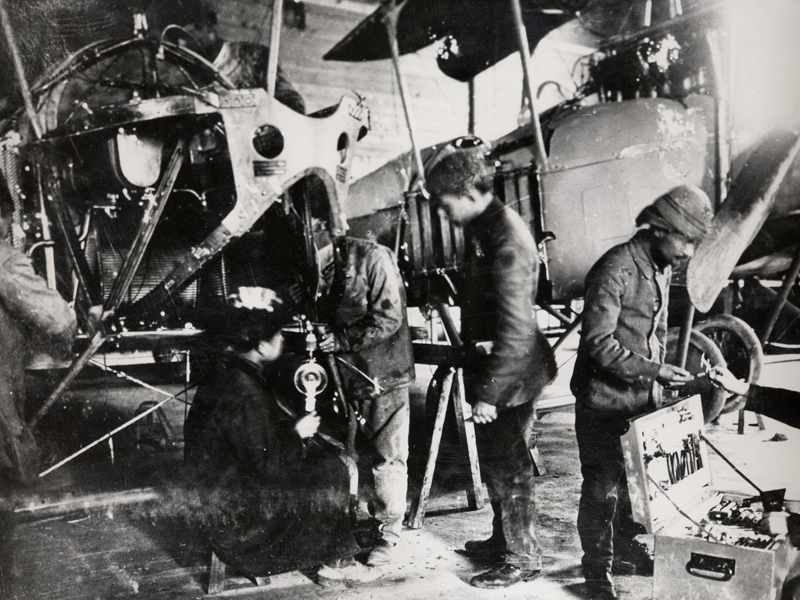
Assembly of an Ottoman airplane during WWI (1914-1918)

Turkish shipyards, which had been producing ships in large quantities for centuries, came to the point where they could no longer produce modern ships. Despite the great decline in the shipping sector, the Ottomans did not give up their desire to produce cannons and rifles. From the 1840s onwards, they tried alternative methods such as technology transfer or purchasing machinery. Many heavy industry investments such as the Zeytinburnu Iron Factory were also made. By the 1890s, the Ottomans were generally producing German rifles and cannons under license, but production quantities were insufficient. The Crimean War of 1853-56, the Turkish-Russian War of 1877-78 and the large-scale rebellions that occurred regularly throughout the empire made it necessary for the state to constantly purchase weapons from abroad. In addition, the shortage of qualified workers was another factor. The Balkan War of 1912 led to the loss of Salonika, the largest industrial city of the empire. The occupation of Istanbul in 1918 caused Turkey's only defense industry center to be taken out of control by the Turkish army. This situation paralyzed the logistic structure of the Turkish army fighting the occupying Greek army in Anatolia. With the establishment of the republic in 1923 and the recapture of Istanbul, it was decided to move the defense industry to the farthest place from a possible enemy invasion, namely the center of the country. For this reason, the cannon, rifle, ammunition and gunpowder factories in Istanbul were transferred to the capital Ankara and surrounding cities. New factories also began to be built in Ankara and its surroundings. Having the view that defence industry is a part of the overall industrialization and development, the Republican Administration supported the State's guidance in industrialization and therefore the defense industry during the first planning period. Despite such activities as the in-country aircraft production, a strong infrastructure could not be established due to internal and external conditions. The cannon, rifle, gunpowder, and ammunition factories (Tophane-i Amire, Tüfenkhane-i Amire, and Baruthane-i Amire) in Istanbul were moved to Ankara and gathered under the name of General Directorate of Military Factories. In 1950, all these factories were combined under the name of Mechanical and Chemical Industry Corporation.

In the post World War II Period, activities in defense industry initiated during the first years of the Republic were not sufficient due to lack of State support, which came to a halt as a result of the foreign military aid received upon promotion of bilateral relations with the United States and Turkey's membership of NATO.

However, regional problems Turkey faced in the 1960s, Cyprus crises in 1963 and 1967, Turkish invasion of Cyprus in 1974 and the arms embargo following the invasion necessitated the development of a defence industry based on national resources. After 1974, Turkish Armed Forces Foundation were established with this understanding and some investments, though limited were initiated.

Besides the administrative and financial difficulties in maintaining and improving the national capabilities, limited national resources as well as the procurement policies proved insufficient to fill the increasing gap in Turkish Armed Forces defence equipment.

=== 1923-1950 ===
Machinery, craftsmen and workmen transferred discreetly from Istanbul and its surroundings at the end of the First World War played a crucial role in winning the War of Independence. Small scale and simple workshops in Ankara, Konya, Eskişehir, Keskin and Erzurum not only provided light weapons and ammunition but also lay thef foundation for a sound local defence industry infrastructure.

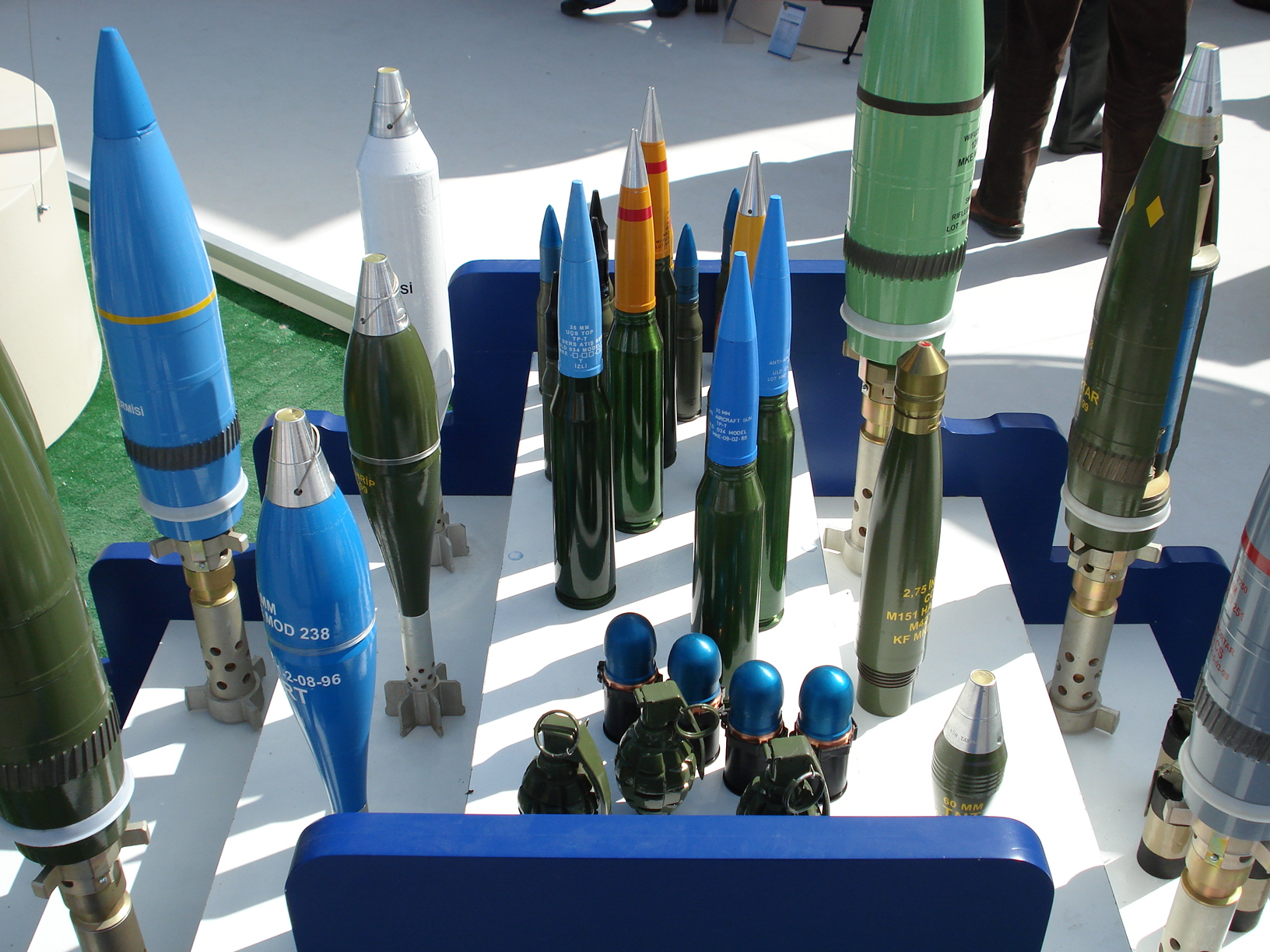
MKEK munitions on display at International Defence Industry Fair 2007

The General Directorate of Military Facilities was set up in 1921. Establishing an industry of weapons and ammunition was discussed for the first time during the İzmir Congress of Economics. In the years before and during World War II a number of defense-related organisations were formed: 1924 a facility for repair of light weapons and artillery and another facility for ammunition and carpenter work in Ankara; in 1924 a new ammunition facility in Ankara; in 1930 a capsule facility in Mamak, Ankara; in 1931 a power station and steel facility in Kırıkkale; in 1936 a facility for gunpowder, rifle and artillery; in 1943 a facility for gas masks in Mamak. In addition, former general Nuri Kıllıgil set up a facility near Haliç region, Istanbul in 1938; it was then one of two private firms producing weapons. Producing pistols, an 81mm mortar and its ammunition, explosives and pyrotechnics, this facility provided support to the Turkish Armed Forces during World War II.

In 1924, Gölcük Naval Shipyard was set up for the maintenance of the battlecruiser Yavuz Sultan Selim. In 1941, Taşkızak Shipyard was reactivated.

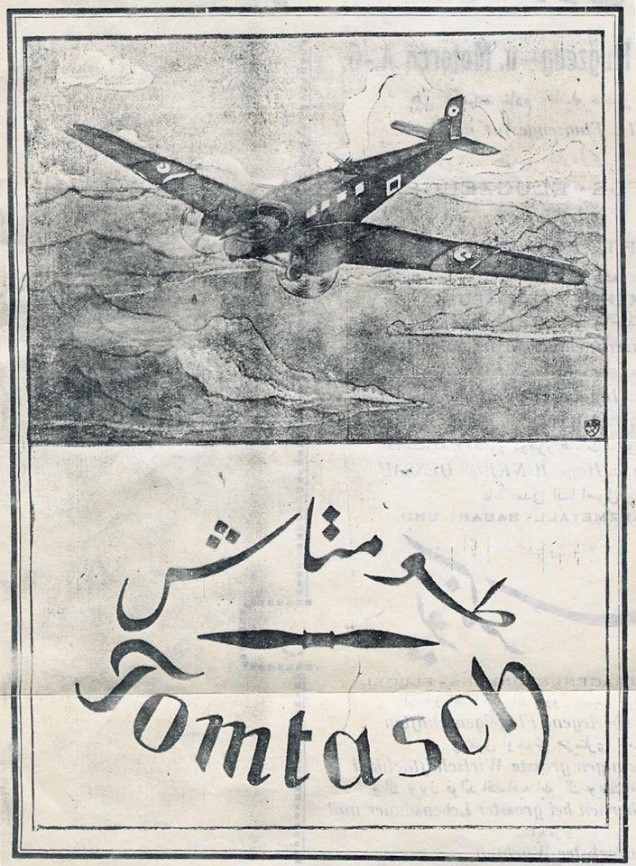
TOMTAŞ logo from 1920s with the name written in Ottoman Turkish and German

The Turkish aviation industry was initiated through the establishment of Tayyare ve Motor Türk Anonim Şirketi (TOMTAŞ) in 1926. The facilities of TOMTAŞ in Kayseri produced and maintained various aircraft until 1928 when the company was shut down due to financing issues with Junkers of Germany. The factory was reopened in 1931 as Kayseri Uçak Fabrikası and manufactured a total of 50 aircraft for Turkey’s aeronautical training organisation Türkkuşu of three different types. Until 1939, a total of 112 aircraft were produced, amongst which were 15 German Junkers A 20s, 15 US Curtiss Hawk fighters, 10 US Curtiss Fledgling trainers and 15 German Gotha Go 145 liaison aircraft. After completion of the maintenance of the aircraft in the inventory of the Turkish Air Force, Kayseri Uçak Fabrikası suspended aircraft production in 1939.

Twenty-four Nuri Demirağ Nu D.36 aircraft and many gliders were produced in a facility founded by Nuri Demirağ in Istanbul in 1936, but this private factory was out of operation by 1943.

The first major initiative in the aviation industry was the formation of an aircraft facility by the Turkish Aviation Association in Ankara in 1941. Starting production in 1944, this facility produced 80 versions of the British Miles Magister trainer aircraft; indigenous THK-5 and THK-10 twin–engine ambulance and light transport aircraft; 60 indigenous MKEK-4 two-seater trainer aircraft and various types of gliders. The first aircraft engine facility was set up in Ankara in 1945 and started production in 1948. Various facilities were established in Malatya between 1942 and 1943 in order to repair and maintain aircraft procured from the United Kingdom during World War II.

Foreign military aid started with the Marshall Plan and Turkey's membership in NATO in 1952 and increased within a short period. This stalled the development of the local defense industry which was at its preliminary stage of formation.

=== 1970s-1980s ===
1970s have been the period in which solid initiatives were put into force so as to establish a national defence industry. In 1974, Turkey decided to launch a military operation in Cyprus to help the Turks who were under attack. The US, protesting Turkey's military operation in Cyprus, decided to impose a military embargo on Turkey. This decision caused a situation that paralyzed the logistics structure of the Turkish Armed Forces. Because almost all the equipment and spare parts used by the Turkish army and especially the air force were American-made. This situation forced Turkish policymakers into a difficult dilemma. The leaders of the coalition government that carried out the Cyprus Peace Operation, Bülent Ecevit and Necmettin Erbakan, decided to end foreign dependency in the defense industry. Other governments that came to power later also remained loyal to this decision. As a result of the national reaction to the arms embargo against Turkey, the Armed Forces Foundation was established. Although these Foundations formed enterprises such as Aselsan, Havelsan, Aspilsan thanks to donations, it was soon realized that the actual need for a defence industry as required by the contemporary age could not be met through the Foundation.

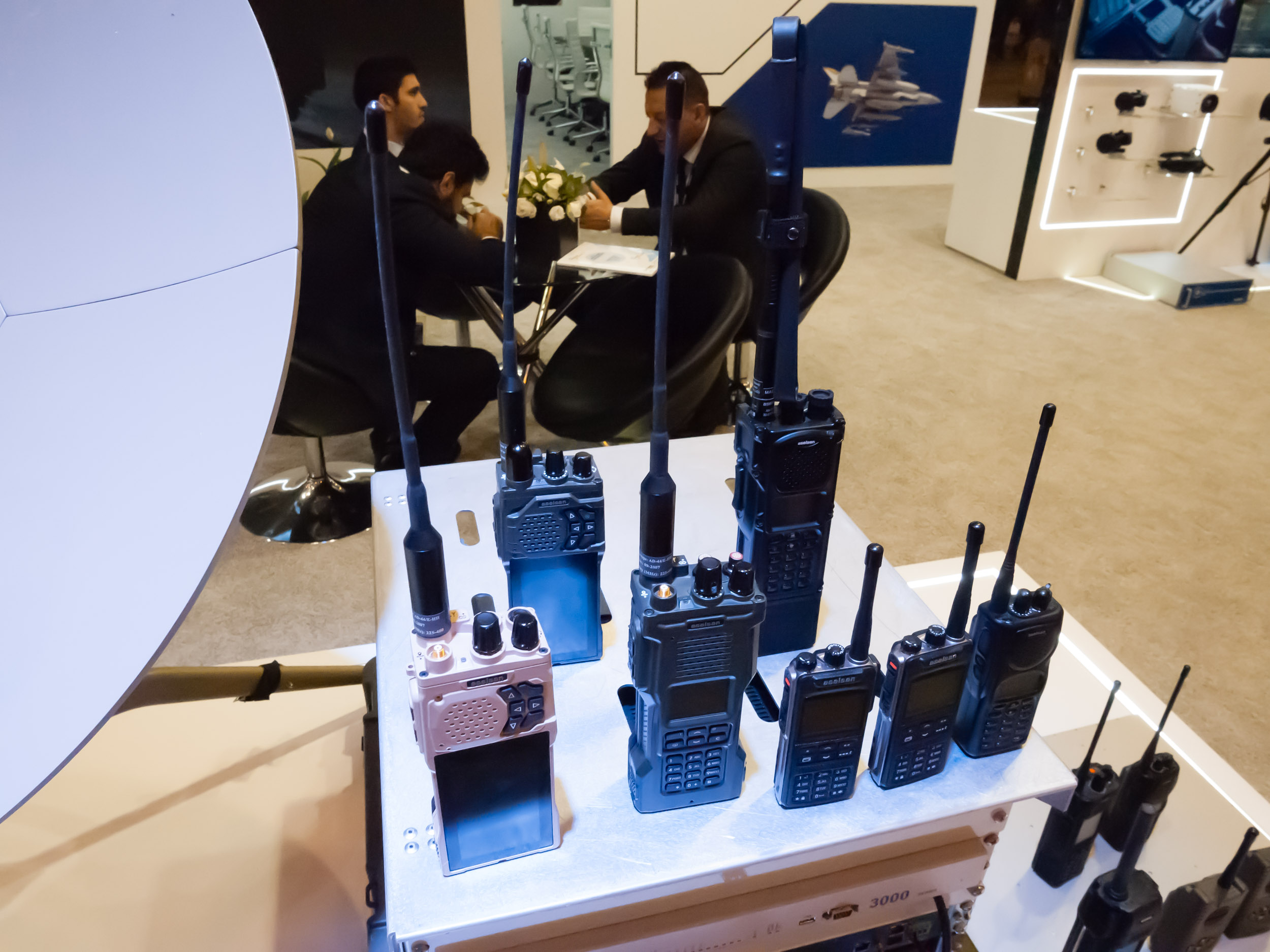
Aselsan started with military communication devices and expanded into the electromagnetic warfare sphere

After the US imposed a military embargo on Turkey following the 1974 Cyprus operation, acting on the principle of "self-sufficiency in the defense industry", Turkey established Turkish Aerospace Industries (TAI) in 1974 to operate in the aviation sector, and Aselsan in 1975 to operate in the wireless and electronics sector. The US failed to achieve its desired goal by imposing an embargo on Turkey but caused the US to lose its influence on Turkey. These two companies would become the largest defense industry companies in Turkey in the modern era.

In the 1980s, state initiative was undertaken to realize the modernization of the Turkish Armed Forces and the establishment of a national defence industry based on contemporary technology was set as the primary goal. Havelsan was established in 1982 and Roketsan, Turkey's largest missile manufacturer, was established in 1988. During the term of Prime Minister Turgut Özal, the idea of technology transfer in the defense industry was generally adopted. In this direction, joint projects were developed with Western allied countries and joint defense industry companies were established. Turkish Engine Industries (TEI) was established in 1985 with an American partnership to maintain, repair and produce engine parts for F-16 fighter jets and engines.

The first step in this direction was taken by the establishment of defence equipment Directorate as a state enterprise. However, the shortcomings stemming from its state-bound status prevented the success and all the properties of that enterprise were transferred to the Undersecretariat for Defense Industries (SSM) which was established in 1985 under the Law No: 3238.

=== 2000s ===
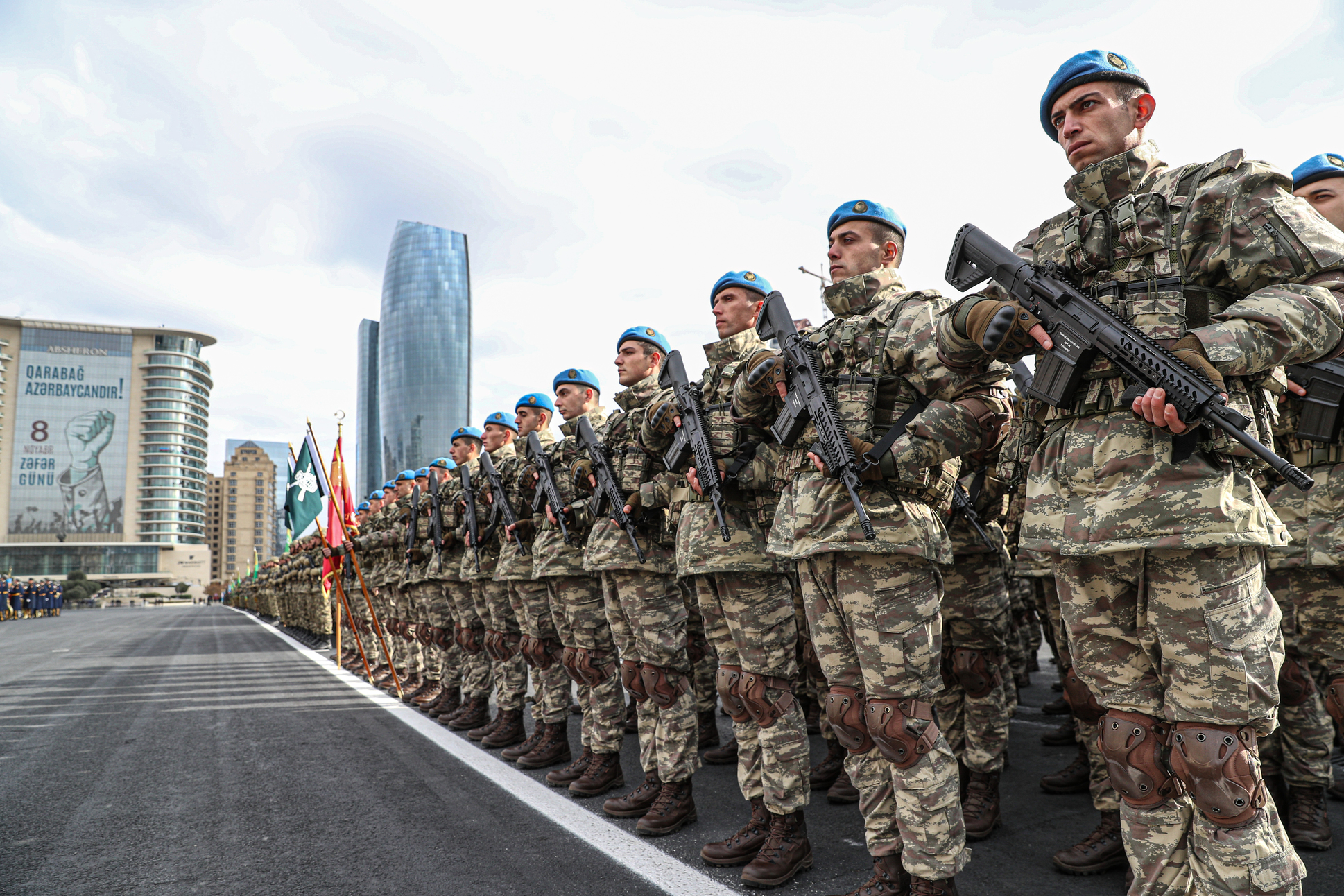
Servicemen of the Turkish Special Forces at the 2020 Baku Victory Parade with MPT rifles

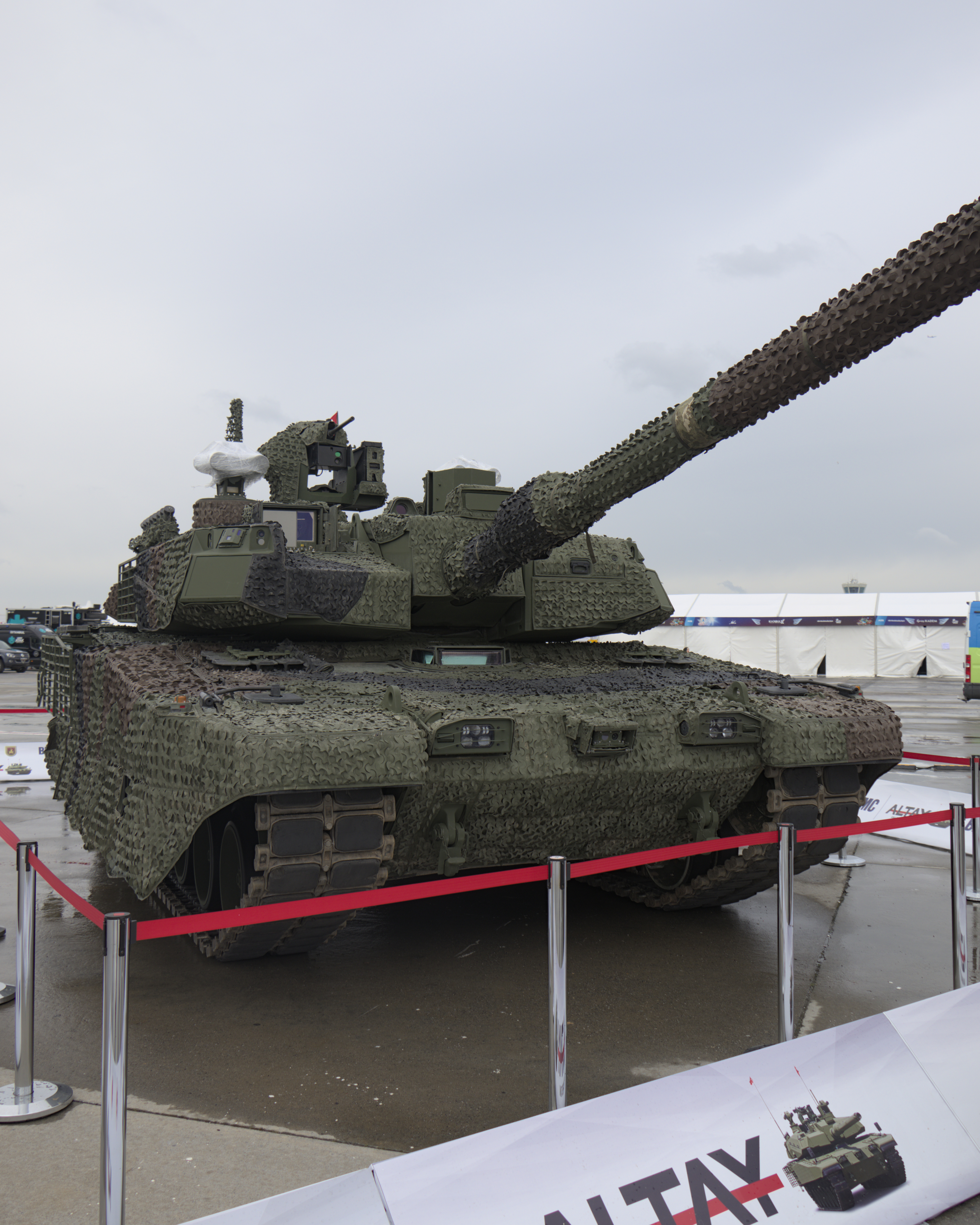
Altay T1 domestic main battle tank

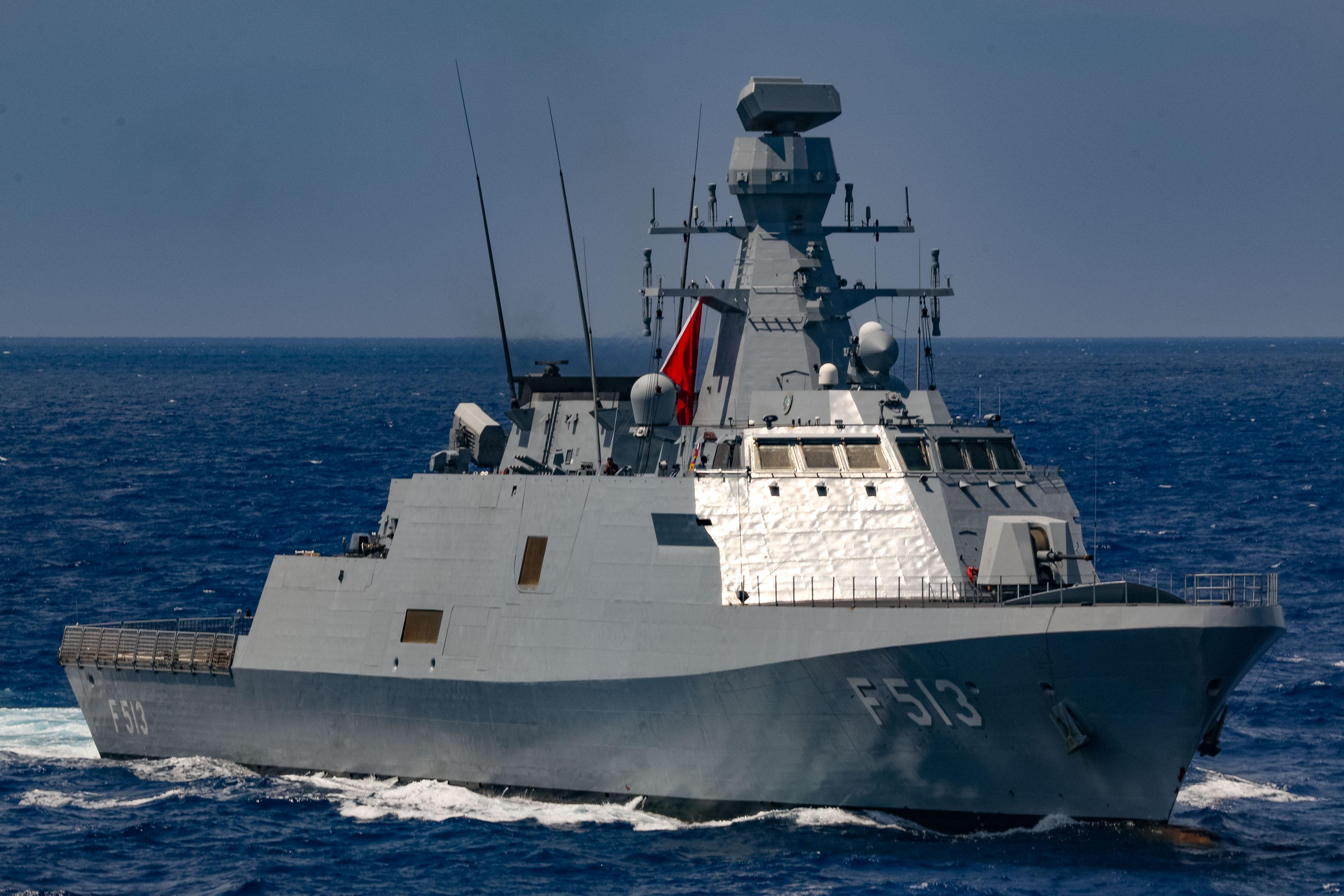
MILGEM project office focused on building a modern littoral combat ship with authentic anti-submarine warfare and high-seas patrol capability

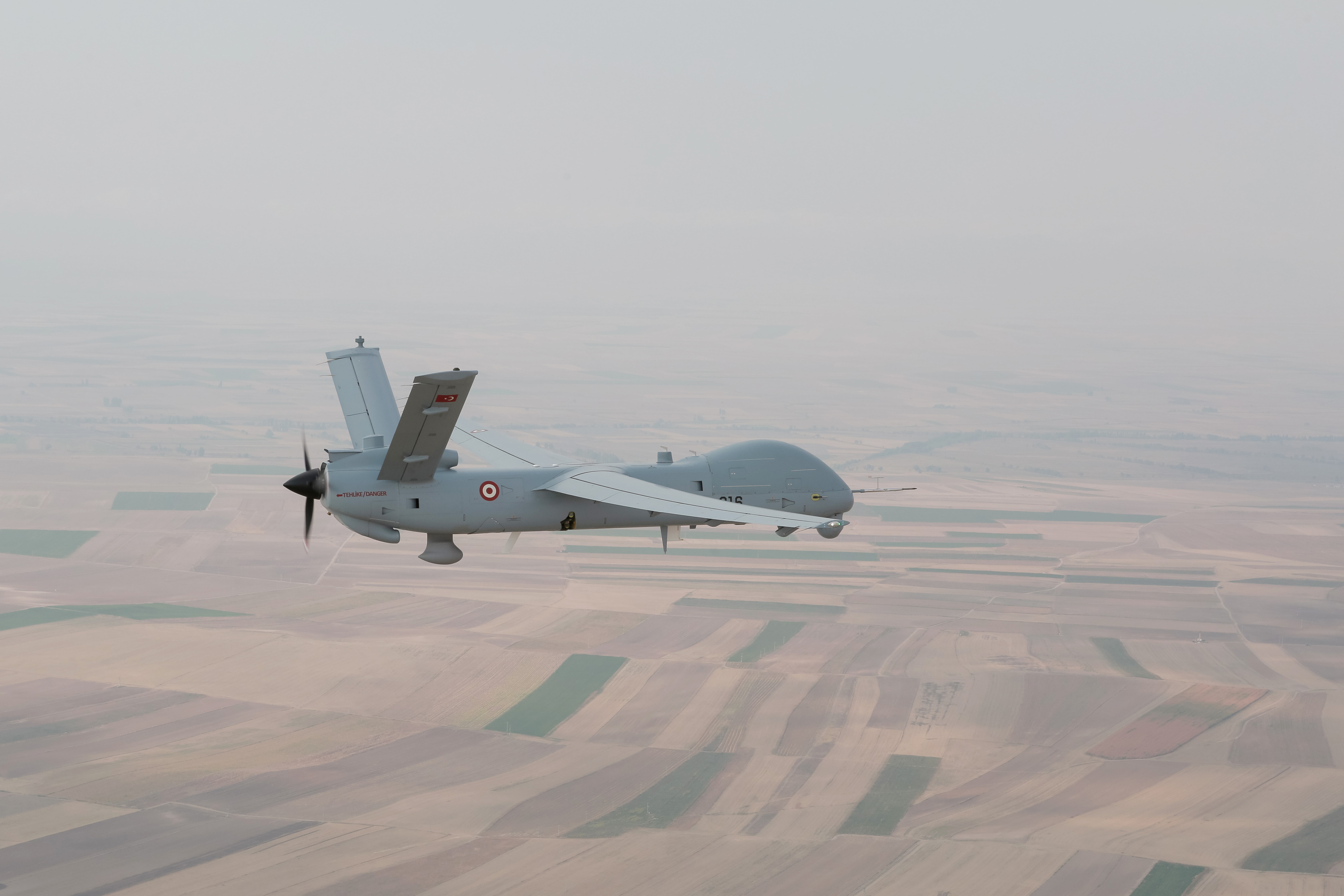
TAI Anka is a family of unmanned aerial vehicles (UAV) developed by Turkish Aerospace Industries. Turkey has 47 active TAI Anka in its inventory

On 13 May 2004, the Defense Industry Executive Committee, chaired by Prime Minister Erdoğan, convened with leading military and civilian executives in Turkey. As a result of the meeting, all tenders made before 2004 to purchase weapons from foreign companies were cancelled. The amount of the cancelled tenders was more than 11 billion US dollars. Under the leadership of Erdoğan, the committee decided that the Turkish defense industry would be independent and that the needs of the armed forces would be met with domestic products. According to this decision, Turkey would order many important war equipment such as tanks, aircraft, helicopters and warships from Turkish companies. In line with this, critical projects were initiated such as the National Infantry Rifle (MPT), National Tank Production Project (MİTÜP), National Ship Project (MİLGEM), National Submarine Project (MİLDEN), Aircraft Carrier Project (MUGEM), Attack Helicopter Project (ATAK), National Combat Aircraft Project (MMU), Steel Dome air defense system, and the space-based Regional Positioning and Timing System (BKZS) along with the low Earth orbit (LEO) communications satellites projects. This meeting and the decisions taken completely changed the modern Turkish defense industry.

Turkey has reached a level where it can produce rifles such as MKE MPT, HGK Guided Bombs, anti-tank missiles such as UMTAS, Karaok, Roketsan Cirit, OMTAS, Atmaca anti-ship missiles with its own engine, Sungur MANPAD, Hisar and Siper air defense missiles, Aselsan GOKDENIZ, KORKUT air defence systems, armored vehicles such as Otokar Cobra II, Otokar Tulpar, Otokar Arma, FNSS Pars, FNSS ZAHA, BMC Kirpi, BMC Vuran, Nurol Ejder, Altay main battle tank and Kaplan light tank, T-155 Fırtına self-propelled howitzer, T-129 and T-929 attack type helicopters with its own engine, drones such as TB-2 Bayraktar, Anka, TAI Aksungur, Akıncı, jet powered drones such as TAI Anka-3 and Bayraktar Kızılelma, ballistic missiles such as Tayfun and Bora, air-to-air missiles Gökdoğan, Bozdoğan, Gökhan, cruise missile such as SOM and Çakır, torpedoes such as Roketsan Akya, electronic warfare systems such as Koral, AESA radars such as MURAD AESA Radar, Ada-class corvettes, Istanbul-class frigates, TF2000-class destroyers, a national aircraft carrier, military satellites such as the Göktürk-3, fighter planes such as TAI Hürkuş, Hürjet and finally the fifth-generation stealth warplane called Kaan. In 40 years, the Turkish defense industry has come to a point where it can produce almost anything, from infantry rifles to fifth-generation fighter jets.

== See also ==
- Modern equipment and uniform of the Turkish Army
- Turkish Armed Forces
- Turkish Army
- Turkish Navy
- Turkish Air Force
- Turkish Gendarmerie
- Defense industry

== Sources ==
- https://web.archive.org/web/20081221175824/http://www2.ssm.gov.tr/katalog2007/eng/urunler.html
- http://www.ssm.gov.tr/EN/savunmasanayiimiz/Pages/BugunkuDurum.aspx
- http://www.ssm.gov.tr/EN/savunmasanayiimiz/Pages/Tarihce.aspx
