= MD-22 =

Type of aircraft

General information
- Type: unmanned combat aerial vehicle
- National origin: China
- Manufacturer: CAS Institute of Mechanics and the Guangdong Aerodynamic Research Academy (GARA)
- Status: In development

History
- Manufactured: 2022

MD-22 (Chinese: 鸣镝-22 / 鸣镝-二十二; pinyin: míng dí-22 / míng dí-èrshíèr) is a hypersonic unmanned combat aerial vehicle developed by the CAS Institute of Mechanics and the Guangdong Aerodynamic Research Academy (GARA), this Unmanned Aerial Vehicle, the MD-22, is a near-space hypersonic technology demonstrator and test platform. The aircraft can be launched through a specialized Xian H-6 mothership.

== Specification ==
Data from turdef.com

General characteristics

- Crew: 0
- Length: 10.8 m (35 ft 5 in)
- Width: 4.5 m (14 ft 9 in)
- Height: 1.6 m (5 ft 3 in)
- Empty weight: 1,000 kg (2,205 lb)
- Gross weight: 4,000 kg (8,818 lb)

Performance

- Maximum speed: 8,645 km/h (5,372 mph, 4,668 kn)
- Maximum speed: Mach 7
- Range: 8,000 km (5,000 mi, 4,300 nmi)
- g limits: 6

== See also ==
- FL-71
- FH-97A
- AVIC Dark Sword
- Baykar Bayraktar Kızılelma
- Lockheed Martin SR-72
- WZ-8
