= Bayraktar Kızılelma =

Turkish unmanned combat aerial vehicle

Bayraktar Kızılelma (Red Apple)
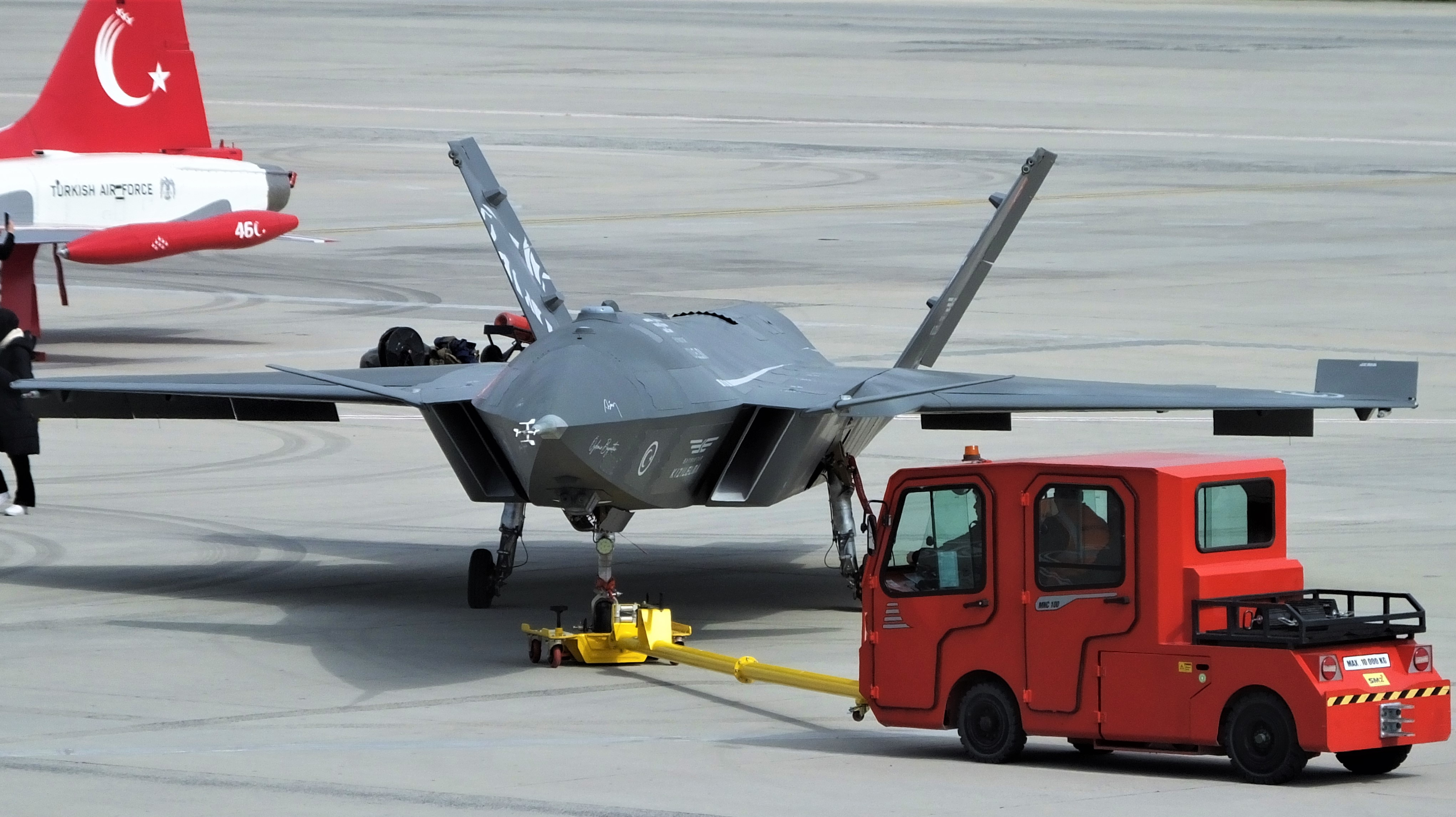
- Baykar Kızılelma at Teknofest 2023

General information
- Type: Loyal wingman capable stealth multirole unmanned fighter aircraft; Artificial intelligence based autonomous aircraft
- National origin: Turkey
- Manufacturer: Baykar; LBA Systems (joint Baykar and Leonardo partnership)
- Primary user: Turkish Armed Forces
- Prototypes: 5 prototypes
- Number built: 5 serial production

History
- Introduction date: 2025
- First flight: 14 December 2022
- In service: 19 November 2026-present

The Bayraktar Kızılelma (English: Red Apple) is a single-engine, stealth, carrier-capable, jet-powered, artificial intelligence capable multirole unmanned fighter aircraft, developed by Turkish defense company Baykar. It is also a loyal wingman drone. It is the world's first operational unmanned fighter aircraft. It is one of the two Turkish jet-powered stealth UCAV, along with the TAI Anka-3. The aircraft incorporates autonomous flight, take off, landing and taxi capability. It is equipped with an artificial intelligence (AI) enabled mission computer. Its structure is optimized for both short-runway and aircraft carrier operations. The aircraft is equipped with Aselsan made MURAD AESA Radar, KARAT Infrared search and track system and TOYGUN Electro-optical targeting system (EOTS).

On 30 November 2025, the Kızılelma successfully completed an air-to-air BVR engagement test, launching a Gökdoğan missile at a target drone guided by its own radar, becoming the first autonomous aerial platform to do so. On 17 December 2025, two Kızılelma performed the world's first autonomous close-formation flight by two unmanned fighter jets, using artificial intelligence. On 22 June 2026, Bayraktar Kızılelma demonstrated its loyal wingman capabilities by conducting aerial manned-unmanned teaming operations alongside a Leonardo M-346 manned aircraft for the first time.

== Development ==
Bayraktar Kızılelma flight at Teknofest

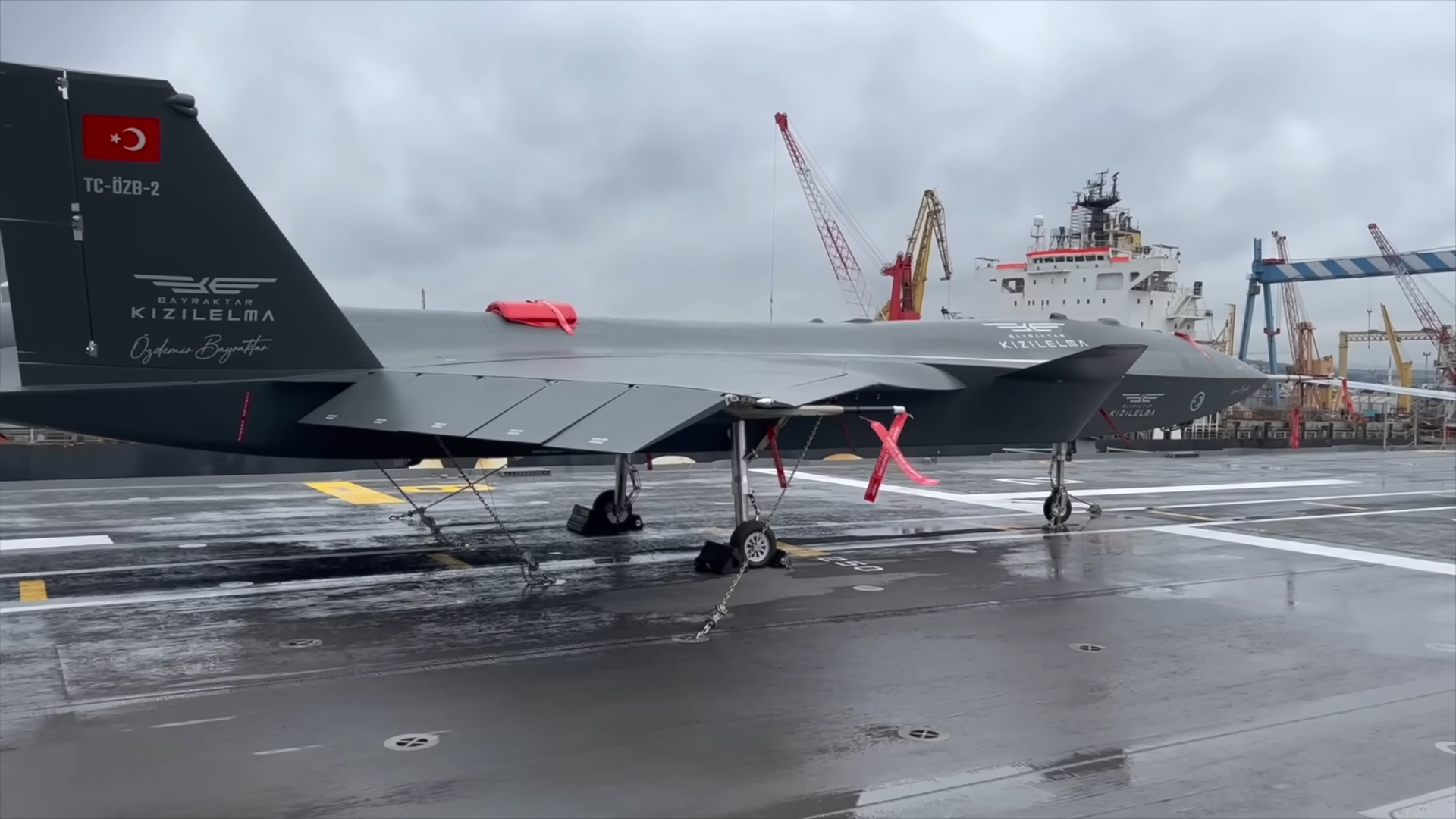
Bayraktar Kızılelma on drone carrier-amphibious assault ship TCG Anadolu

The aircraft project was initially known as Project MIUS (Turkish: Muharip İnsansız Uçak Sistemi; English: Combatant Unmanned Aircraft System). The first conceptual studies for the Bayraktar MIUS program for the Bayraktar Kızılelma started in 2013. In July 2021, the first design images and information about the characteristics of the aircraft were shared with the public. Haluk Bayraktar stated that Baykar is considering spending $1 billion in the development process of project. Its official name, Kızılelma (Red Apple) was made public in March 2022. The name is a reference to the Red Apple in Turkish mythology.

Baykar CTO Selçuk Bayraktar had initially announced that the Kızılelma was expected to take its maiden flight in 2023, adding that a jet-powered uncrewed fighter was a "12-year-long dream". The Kızılelma was able to complete its first flight ahead of the expected date, in 14 December 2022.

In 2025, after Baykar decided to form a partnership with Leonardo in the field of UAVs, Aviation analysts suggested the Kızılelma could be selected as the loyal wingman aircraft of the Global Combat Air Programme.

=== Prototypes ===
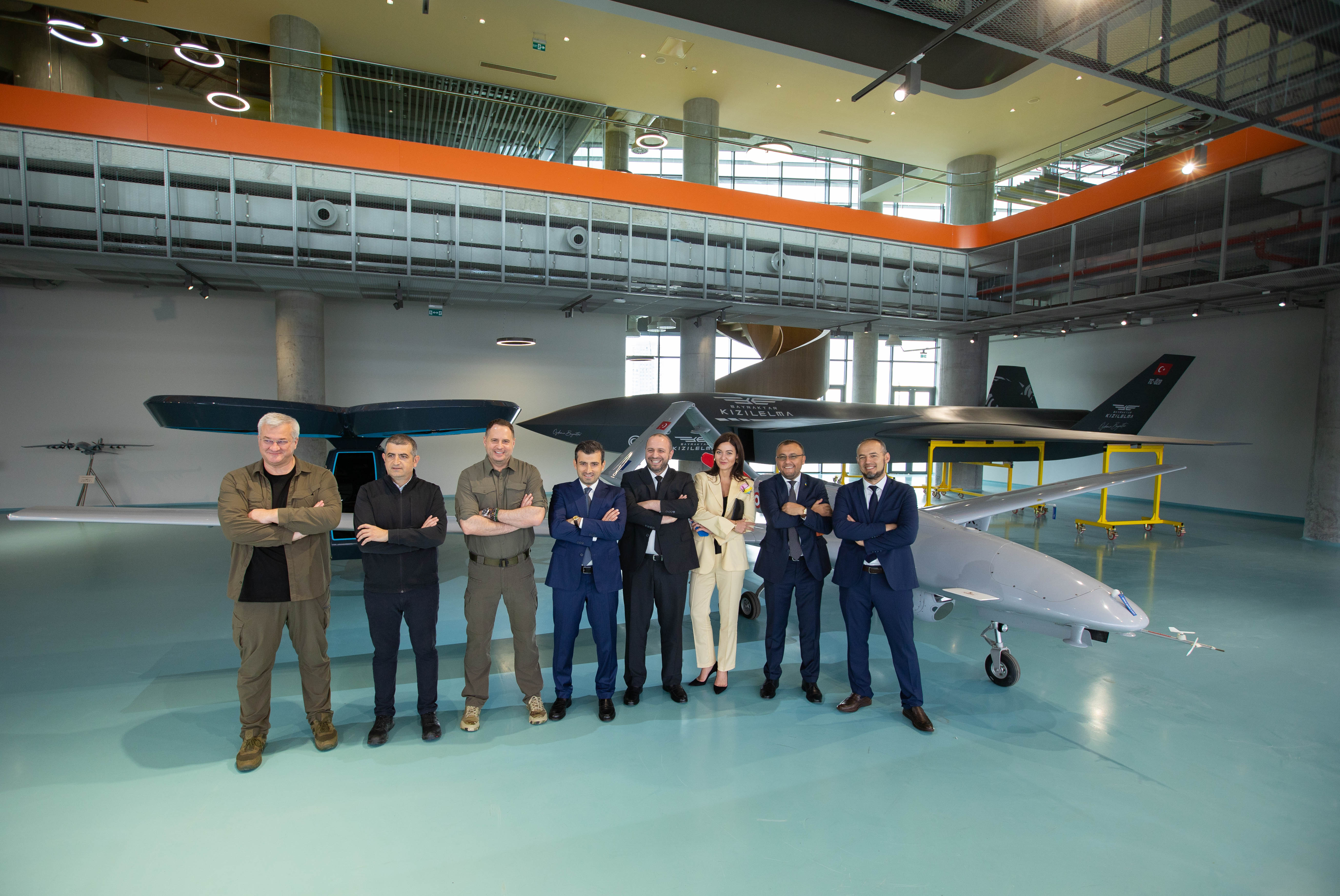
The Bayraktar brothers along with Andriy Yermak and others, in front of the Bayraktar Kızılelma and Bayraktar TB2

On the same day of the name disclosure, Selçuk Bayraktar revealed that the first Kızılelma prototype had entered the assembly line. The first ready-to-fly prototype was displayed to the public in Teknofest 2022. The third prototype, which is considered the production prototype, successfully completed its first flight on 25 September 2024 from the AKINCI Flight Training and Test Center in Çorlu. This prototype, with tail number TC-ÖZB3, featured significant structural and airframe differences from the original, including an afterburning engine, aerodynamic improvements, and an updated avionics architecture.

=== Testing process ===
- The first engine integration test was successfully conducted on 19 September 2022.
- On 20 November 2022, automatic taxiing and ground running tests were carried out.
- Take-off test flights began on 3 December 2022 and the aircraft completed its initial short-hop test.
- The aircraft made its maiden flight on 14 December 2022.
- The drone successfully made its second flight in mid-January 2023.
- 15 April 2023, the aircraft completed its fourth flight test.
- 18 April 2023, the aircraft completed its flight test with landing gear folded inside the fuselage .
- 19 April 2023, the aircraft completed its sixth and seventh flight tests with serial landing-take-off and high-speed flight trials.
- 20 April 2023, the aircraft completed its eight flight test with high-speed flight and maneuver trials, as well as serial landing-take-off and passing trials.
- 30 April 2023, Kızılelma flew in formation with a SoloTürk F-16C during TEKNOFEST 2023 in Istanbul.
- 17 June 2023, KIZILELMA reached an altitude of 9.5 km during the 12th test flight.
- 8 October 2025, the third prototype of Kızılelma (PT-3) carried out two separate sorties during live-fire tests at the AKINCI Flight Training and Test Center in Çorlu, Tekirdağ. In the first sortie, the aircraft released an ASELSAN TOLUN precision-guided munition that struck its target.
- At SAHA Expo 2026, Mike Baulkwill, a representative of BAE Systems, stated that the Eurofighter Typhoon would not only support Türkiye’s existing F-16 fleet, but would also operate within a future network-centric structure alongside the national stealth aircraft KAAN, the F-16 ÖZGÜR modernization program, and unmanned systems such as Kızılelma and Anka-3.
- On 22 June 2026, Kızılelma completed the first phase of live flight trials under the Leonardo–Baykar K-SWARM programme. During the tests, Kızılelma autonomously rejoined a Leonardo M-346 Master following take-off and conducted formation changes, separations, and rejoins in response to commands from the M-346 crew as part of crewed–uncrewed combat teaming (CUC-T) trials.
- On 24 June 2026, Kızılelma conducted live-fire tests using Aselsan's TOYGUN electro-optical targeting system. During the tests, munitions equipped with Roketsan's Teber-82 and Aselsan's LGK-82 guidance kits struck their targets.
- On 14 July 2026, Kızılelma conducted live-fire tests. During the tests, Roketsan's Jet-230 missile from a range of more than 120 kilometers (74.6 miles), successfully struck the target.
- On 19 November 2026, Baykar announced that three Kızılelma had successfully completed acceptance tests and entered the inventory of Turkey's security forces, marking a first in global aviation history. The delivery followed a programme that had accumulated 600 test and training sorties.

=== See also ===
Baykar Bayraktar Kemankeş 1
Baykar Bayraktar Kemankeş 2

=== Production ===
In October 2024, Baykar Chairman Selçuk Bayraktar announced that mass production of Kızılelma had begun, with one aircraft already produced. The company aims to achieve production of over 10 units by 2026.

== Design ==
=== Airframe ===
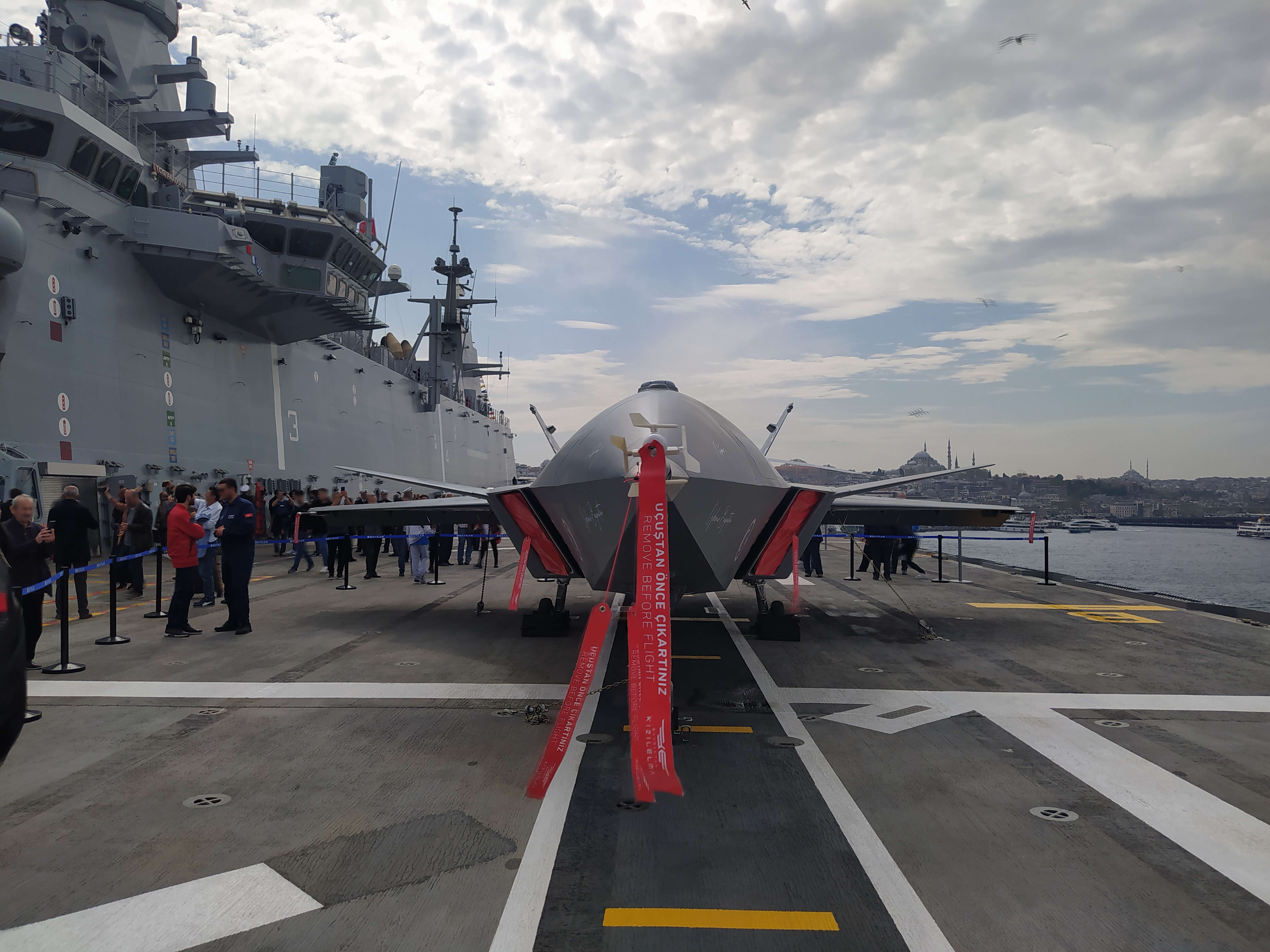
TCG Anadolu (L-400) amphibious assault ship (LHD and V/STOL aircraft carrier) of the Turkish Naval Forces, anchored at the Golden Horn in Istanbul. Baykar Kızılelma, developed as part of Project MIUS for the Turkish Navy and Turkish Air Force, is a jet-engined uncrewed fighter designed to operate on TCG Anadolu. Its maiden flight took place on 14 December 2022. TCG Anadolu was commissioned on 10 April 2023.

The Kızılelma is an uncrewed aircraft featuring a low-RCS supersonic airframe equipped with an AESA radar. The aircraft is powered by a turbofan engine fed by two air inlets. Yaw control is achieved with two vertical stabilizers. The aircraft has coupled-canard controls for increased maneuverability or better controlling the main wing airflow. Internal compartments will allow the aircraft to operate in contested environments while sustaining low observability.

The aerodynamic controls feature canards-delta configuration, previously seen on certain stealth aircraft such as the Chengdu J-20 and the AVIC Dark Sword. The canards offer a trade-off between relatively less stealth but great maneuverability. Some control measures could be implemented to reduce its impact on radar signature.

The Kızılelma has a maximum takeoff weight (MTOW) of 6,000 kilograms (13,200 lb), with 1,500 kg of weight available for the payload. According to data shared by the company, the Kızılelma will have an operational altitude of 25,000 feet (7,620 m).

The production prototype incorporates an AESA radar, likely the MURAD-200A, for improved situational awareness. It also features provisions for defensive and survivability suites such as Aselsan's KARAT-100 Infra-Red Search and Track (IRST), TOYGUN-100 Electro-Optical Tracking System, a Distributed Aperture System (DAS), and an IRIS Missile Approach Warning System (MAWS).

The aircraft is designed in a way that makes it capable to takeoff and land on an amphibious assault ship, such as the TCG Anadolu, without any need for a catapult system.

=== Engine ===
The AI-322 Turbofan Engine Supply Agreement and AI-25TLT Turbofan Engine Integration Agreement were signed between Baykar and Ukrainian Ivchenko-Progress at the SahaExpo event in November 2021. The first prototypes will reach subsonic speeds using AI-25TLT engines. The next prototypes are expected to be supersonic with AI-322F engines.

=== Features ===
- Satellite control
- Fully-autonomous takeoff and landing
- Low radar cross-section
- High maneuverability
- Line Of Sight (LOS) and Beyond LOS (BLOS) controlled
- Takeoff and landing capability from short-runway aircraft carriers
- High situational awareness with AESA radar
- Internal weapons bays
- Carrier capability

== Potential sales ==
=== Indonesia ===
In May 2026, Baykar signed the first export agreement for the Bayraktar Kızılelma-C with Indonesian company PT Republik Aero Dirgantara (Republikorp) during the SAHA 2026 defense exhibition in Istanbul. The framework agreement includes an initial batch of 12 aircraft scheduled for delivery beginning in 2028, with options for additional orders that could increase the total number to 60 aircraft. The deal also includes the establishment of local production and maintenance facilities in Indonesia.

In October 2026, the Ministry of Defense of Indonesia stated that there are no procurement contract nor acquisition commitment of Kızılelma for the Indonesian military. The Kızılelma is still under cosideration.

=== Pakistan ===
The Pakistan Air Force has reportedly expressed interest in buying the Bayraktar Kızılelma and potentially even co-producing it for future manned-unmanned teaming with its fleets of JF-17s, J-35s, and Kaans, however no official deal were signed.

== Variants ==
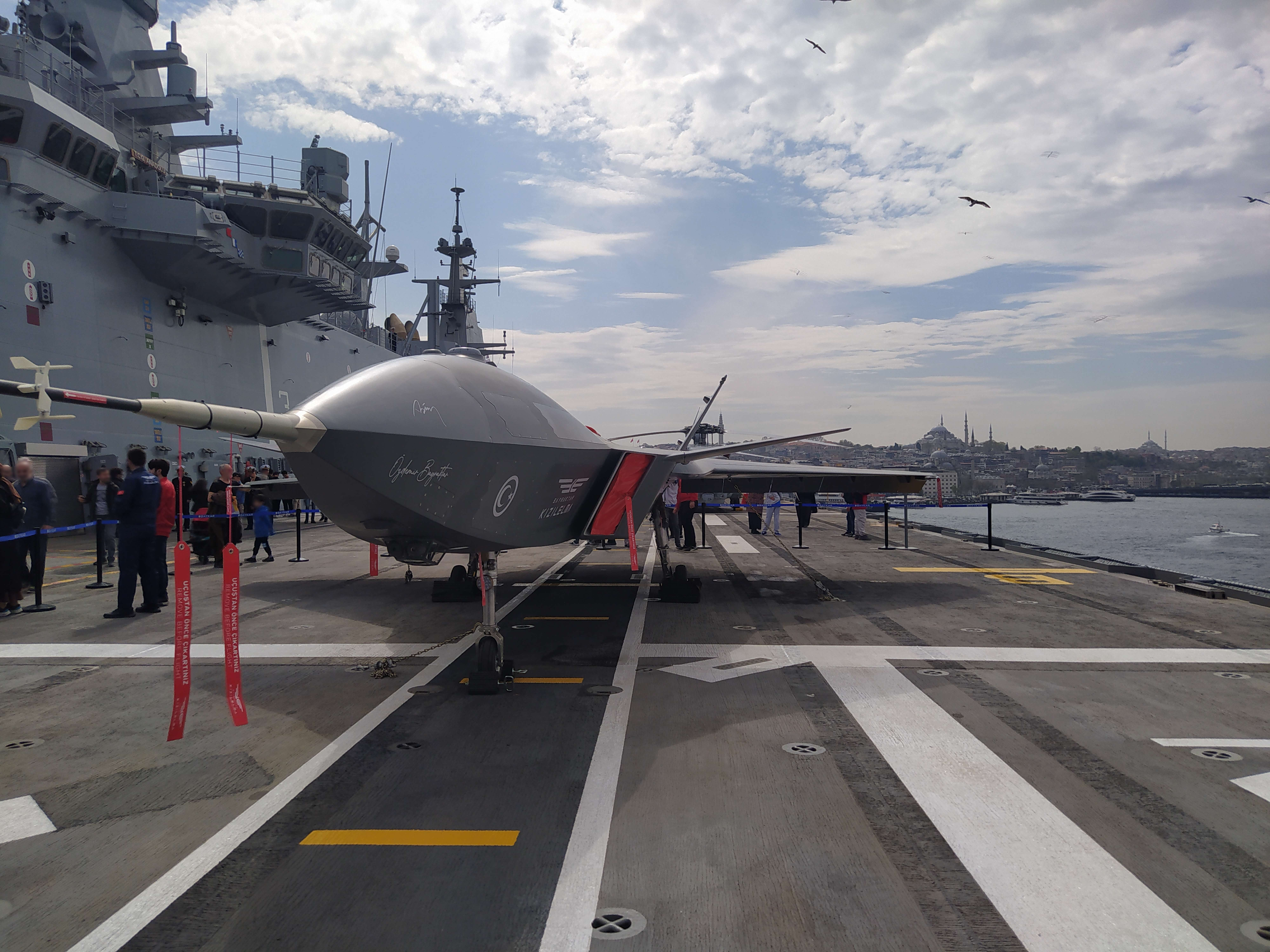
Baykar MIUS Kızılelma uncrewed fighter on TCG Anadolu

During Teknofest 2022, Baykar announced that there will be at least 3 variants of Kızılelma with different engine configurations. The initial Bayraktar Kızılelma (Kızılelma-A) is subsonic. Planned variants (Kızılelma-B and Kızılelma-C) are intended to be supersonic, with the latter having a twin-engined configuration.

The engines are produced by the Turkish-Ukrainian joint venture Black Sea Shield. Kızılelma-A will be capable of near-supersonic speeds, being powered by the AI-25TLT engine. Kızılelma-B will fly at supersonic speeds, powered by a single Ukrainian AI-322F engine. The Kızılelma-C will incorporate two AI-322F engines.

While the production prototype uses a Ukrainian AI-322 afterburning engine, allowing it to approach sonic speeds with improved maneuverability at high speeds. Baykar has stated that there will be several types of engines available for Kızılelma within 5–6 years, aiming to reduce foreign dependency.

== Operators ==
=== Operators ===
- Turkey:
  - Turkish Air Force
  - Turkish Navy

== Specifications (Kızılelma-A) ==
Data from Baykar Technology and Turkey Today

General characteristics

- Capacity: 1,500 kg (3,300 lb)
- Length: 14.5 m (47 ft 7 in)
- Wingspan: 10 m (32 ft 10 in)
- Height: 3.5 m (11 ft 6 in)
- Max takeoff weight: 8,500 kg (18,739 lb)
- Fuel capacity: unspecified Jet-A1 or JP-8 fuel capacity
- Powerplant: 1 × Ivchenko-Progress AI-25TLT Turbofan engine, 16.9 kN (3,790 lbf) thrust - no afterburners (Kızılelma-A).
- Powerplant: 1 × Ivchenko-Progress AI-322F Turbofan engine, 24.5 kN (5,510 lbf) thrust dry, and 9,900 lbf (44 kN) with afterburner (Kızılelma-B).

Performance

- Maximum speed: 1,100 km/h (680 mph, 590 kn) 0.9 Mach
- Cruise speed: 735 km/h (457 mph, 400 kn) 0.6 Mach
- Combat range: 930 km (580 mi, 500 nmi) on internal fuel
- Endurance: 3+ hours
- Service ceiling: 14,000 m (45,000 ft)
- Operational altitude: 7,600 m (25,000 ft)

Armament

- Hardpoints: 2 × internal stations, 6 × external stations on wings
- Guided rockets
  - CIRIT
- Missiles
  - Air-to-air missiles
    - Gökdoğan BVR AAM
    - Bozdoğan AAM
    - Akdoğan AAM
    - Gökhan AAM
  - Air-to-surface missiles
    - SOM air-launched cruise missile
    - TUBITAK-SAGE KUZGUN-TJ Turbojet-powered, air-to-surface missile
    - TUBITAK-SAGE KUZGUN-KY Solid fuel rocket-powered, air-to-surface missile
    - TUBITAK-SAGE KUZGUN-ER, Turbojet-powered, air-to-surface missile (According to TUBITAK-SAGE, this missile will be equivalent to Penguin Missiles.)
    - TUBITAK-SAGE KUZGUN-EW, Kuzgun-EW will be able to carry miniaturised EW payload which will act as a stand-in jammer and suppress enemy air defences to significantly increase the survivability of the aircraft of the Turkish Air Force.
    - L-UMTAS Air-to-surface, anti-tank guided missile
    - AKBABA, Air-to-surface, anti-radiation missile
    - ROKETSAN ÇAKIR, anti-ship, air-to-surface, surface-to-surface cruise missile.
    - TRG-230-iHA, Supersonic, air-to-surface missile
    - Jet-230, Supersonic, air-to-surface missile.
- Bombs
  - TOLUN guided glide bombs (The bomb has bunker buster capability. It is equipped with INS / GPS guidance.)
  - Teber-81 (Mark 81 bomb w/ ROKETSAN Laser Guidance Kit)
  - HGK-82 (Mark 82 bomb w/ TUBITAK-SAGE Precision Guidance Kit)
  - KGK-82 (Mark 82 bomb w/ TUBITAK-SAGE Wing Assisted Guidance Kit)
  - LGK-82 (Mark 82 bomb w/ ASELSAN Laser Guidance Kit)
  - Teber-82 (Mark 82 bomb w/ ROKETSAN Laser Guidance Kit)
  - HGK-83 (Mark 83 bomb w/ TUBITAK-SAGE Precision Guidance Kit
  - KGK-83 (Mark 83 bomb w/ TUBITAK-SAGE Wing Assisted Guidance Kit)
  - HGK-84 (Mark 84 bomb w/ TUBITAK-SAGE Precision Guidance Kit)
  - LHGK-84 (Mark 84 bomb w/ TUBITAK-SAGE Laser Sensitive Guidance Kit)
  - TUBITAK-SAGE TOGAN Rack of four 81 mm mortars (GPS/INS or unguided)
  - TUBITAK-SAGE KUZGUN-SS Glide bomb
  - Aselsan Miniature Bomb (MB)
  - SARB-83 Bunker buster
  - NEB-84 Bunker buster
  - TUBITAK-SAGE BOZOK
  - MAM-C
  - MAM-L
  - MAM-T

Avionics

- Aselsan MURAD 100-A AESA Radar
- Aselsan KARAT Infrared search and track (IRST) system
- Aselsan TOYGUN Electro-optical targeting system (EOTS)
- Aselsan Common Aperture Targeting System
- Electronic Warfare Pod
- National SIGINT module

== See also ==
=== Similar aircraft ===
Turkey:

- TAI Anka-3
- Bayraktar TB3

China:

- FH-97A
- MD-22
- FL-71

USA:

- Anduril FQ-44
- General Atomics FQ-42 Dark Merlin
- Kratos XQ-58 Valkyrie

Australia:

- Boeing MQ-28 Ghost Bat

India:

- HAL Combat Air Teaming System
