= MURAD AESA Radar =

Type of radar system

MURAD
- Country of origin: Turkey
- Manufacturer: Aselsan
- Designer: Aselsan
- Introduced: In development
- Type: Solid-state AESA

MURAD (Milli Uçak Radarı - National Aircraft Radar) is a solid-state active electronically scanned array (AESA) radar system family developed by Turkish state-owned Aselsan. The radar is designed to enhance air combat capabilities and features advanced multi-mode functionality for a variety of operational requirements. It employs cutting-edge technology to ensure high reliability and performance across different environments. There are currently two Murad radars under development; Murad 110-A and Murad 600-A.

== Development ==
The development of the MURAD AESA radars commenced in the early 2020s, with the aim of meeting the increasing demands for advanced radar systems in modern air combat. The radar was first showcased at the 2022 Istanbul Airshow, demonstrating its capabilities in real-time target detection and tracking. The radar's design focuses on flexibility and modularity, allowing it to be integrated into various aircraft platforms.

Aselsan is the primary contractor, overseeing the radar's development, testing, and production processes. The radar system aims to enhance the capabilities of existing platforms while being suitable for future fighter jets.

=== Testing ===
As of 2024, the MURAD radars has successfully completed initial testing phases, with numerous flight tests conducted on various testbed aircraft. The radar's performance includes enhancements for air-to-ground and maritime surveillance. The first UAV flight test was successfully carried out with Bayraktar Akıncı on 1 March 2025. The system is expected to be fully operational by 2025. On 5 november 2025, a Turkish F-16 during a test, used Turkish made Gökdoğan air-to-air missile with Murad AESA radar and shot a target drone.

== Features ==
- Full solid-state (electronics) radar system, utilizing GaN technology
- Multi-target tracking capabilities
- Simultaneous multi-mode operation
- Advanced ECM immunity
- Low side-lobe antenna characteristics
- Fast-beam agility and scanning capabilities
- Identification friend or foe (IFF) capabilities
- Compatible with existing Turkish Air Force platforms

== Applications ==
The MURAD radars are designed for integration with various Turkish fighter jets and UAV platforms, including:

- TAI TF Kaan (Planned): The next-generation fighter jet of the Turkish Air Force.
- F-16C/D Özgür/Özgür II (Testing phase): Integration with F-16s for improved target acquisition.
- Bayraktar Akinci (Testing phase): Planned integration with advanced UAVs for multi-role capabilities.
- Bayraktar Kızılelma (Testing phase):The flight test of the Murad radar with Kızılelma was carried out on October 21, 2025.

== Versions ==
- MURAD 110-A (for Turkish F-16)
- MURAD 600-A (for TAI TF Kaan)

== See also ==
- Active electronically scanned array
