= Space program of Turkey =

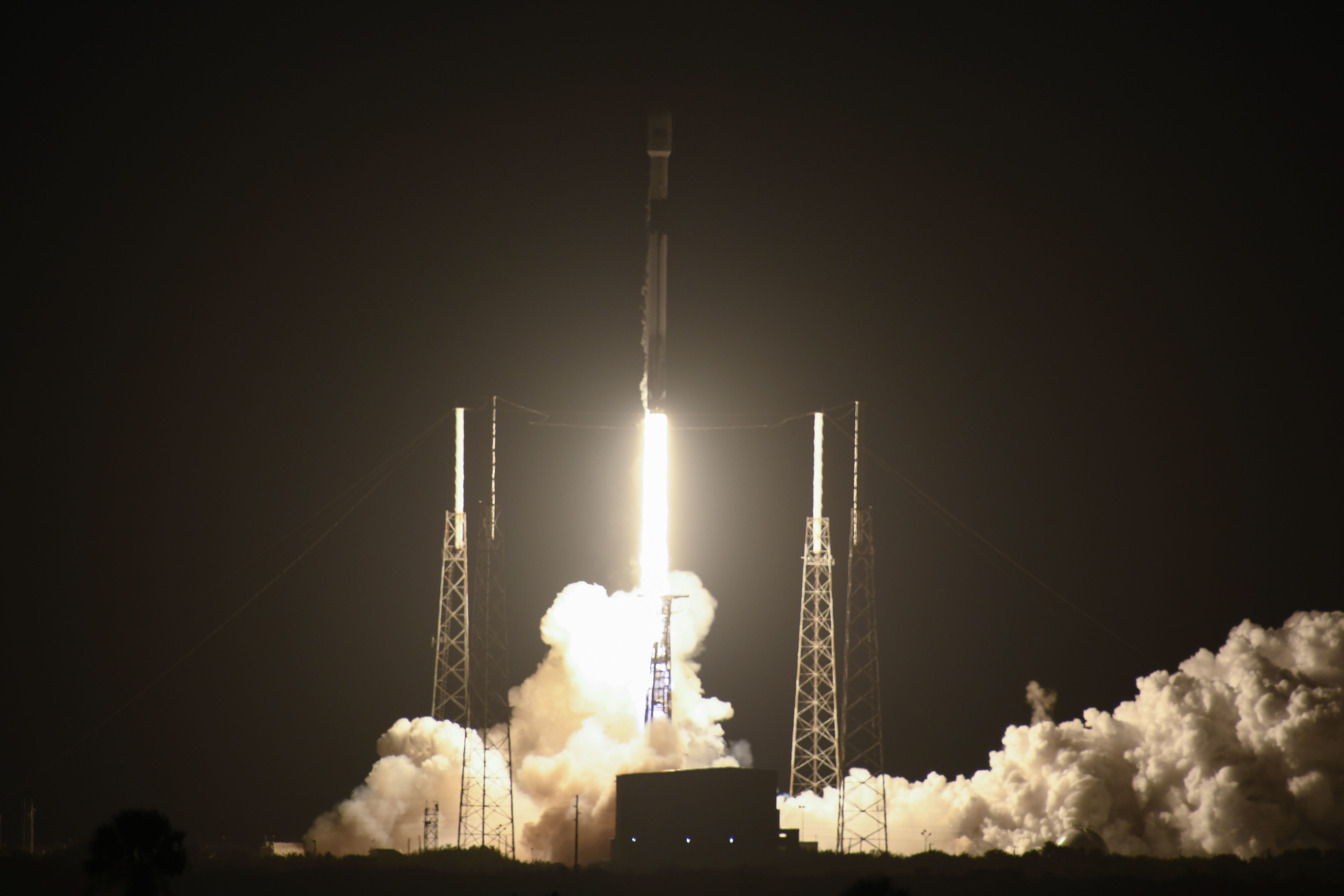
- The Türksat 5A satellite launching from the Cape Canaveral Space Force Station.

Program overview
- Country: Turkey
- Organization: Turkish Space Agency
- Purpose: Furthering Turkey's interests in aerospace
- Status: Ongoing

Program history
- Cost: ₺1.702 billion (2024)
- Duration: 1993; 33 years ago–present
- First crewed flight: Axiom Mission 3 (18 January 2024, 16:49 EST)
- Launch site(s): Baikonur Cosmodrome; Cape Canaveral Space Force Station; Guiana Space Centre

Vehicle information
- Launch vehicle(s): Ariane 4 Falcon 9 Proton-M

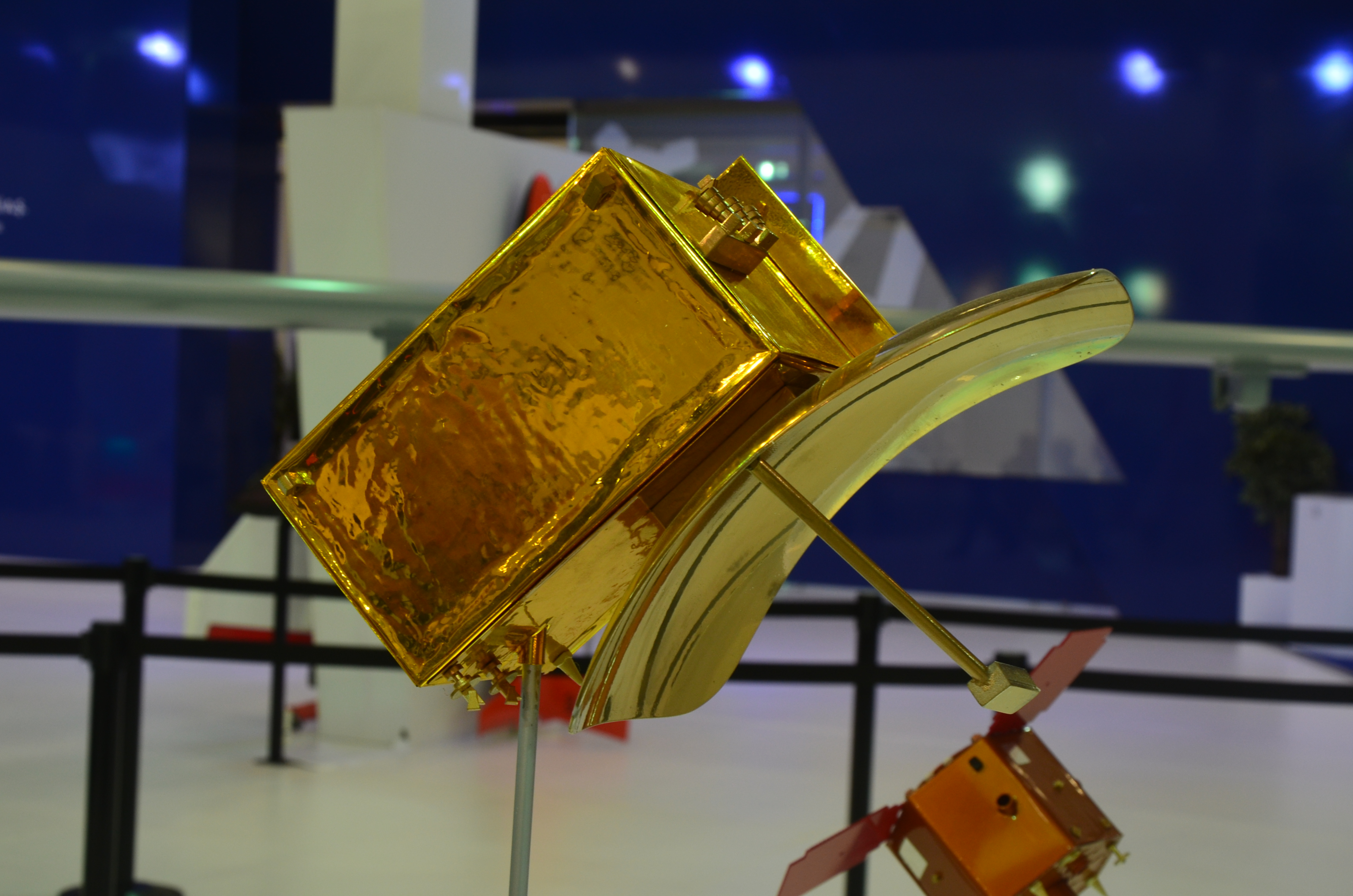
A model of the Göktürk-3 satellite.

Turkey first began developing its space program in 1993, and it has been under the authority of the Turkish Space Agency since 2018.

== History ==
The space program of Turkey developed as part of the Turkish Science and Technology Policy under the authority of the Scientific and Technological Research Council of Turkey in 1993, which designated space technology as one of the primary fields of technology. Prior to that, Turkey became one of the founding members of EUMETSAT as early as 1984. The Turkish Air Force was tasked with making recommendations on a national space agency in 2001. Turkey signed a cooperation agreement with ESA in 2004. In 2018, Turkish Space Agency was founded by Presidential decree. The stated objectives of the Turkish Space Agency include development and resource independence through space technology. The Turkish Space Agency also seeks to develop the space program to increase Turkey's influence and recognition on the world stage. Agency currently has agreements with Ukraine, Hungary and Kazakhstan's space programs, and claims to conduct extensive nation-wide assessments regarding membership to ESA since 2020.

In 2021, President Recep Tayyip Erdoğan announced a 10-year plan for Turkey's space program. Other objectives include development of new space technologies, establishment of a spaceport, the formation of a Space Technology Department, and sending a Turkish citizen to space on a scientific mission. As part of the Axiom Mission 3, Turkey's first astronaut Alper Gezeravcı was launched from the Florida of the United States on January 19, 2024. Gezeravcı, who spent 14 days in space, performed 13 scientific experiments prepared by academic and research institutions in Turkey on the International Space Station and returned to Turkey on February 12, 2024.

== Satellites ==
The state owned satellite communications company Türksat began launching a series of Türksat satellites in 1994. The TÜBİTAK Space Technologies Research Institute is responsible for research and development relating to space technology. It has developed multiple Earth observation satellites, including BILSAT-1 in 2003 and RASAT in 2011. Turkey has also developed the Göktürk series of satellites for military use. Other satellite-related projects being developed by the space program of Turkey include the Regional Positioning and Timing System and the Space Launch System.

== Spaceport ==
A spaceport is being built in Somalia.

== See also ==
- Science and technology in Turkey
