= Baykar Bayraktar Akıncı =

Turkish unmanned combat aerial vehicle

Bayraktar Akıncı
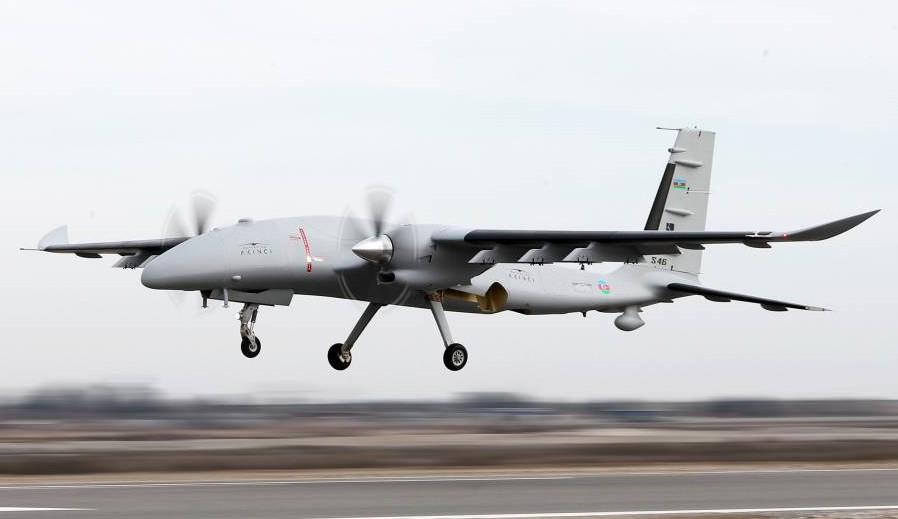
- Azerbaijani Air Force Akinci

General information
- Type: Multirole unmanned combat aerial vehicle
- National origin: Turkey
- Manufacturer: Baykar
- Designer: Baykar
- Status: In service
- Primary user: Turkish Armed Forces
- Number built: 110+

History
- Manufactured: 2019–current
- Introduction date: 29 August 2021
- First flight: 6 December 2019

Bayraktar Akıncı (Turkish pronunciation: [bairaktar akinji], Raider lit. "Akinji") is a multirole high-altitude long-endurance (HALE) unmanned combat aerial vehicle (UCAV) manufactured by Turkish defence company Baykar. The first three units entered service with the Turkish Armed Forces on 29 August 2021.

The aircraft has a six-ton maximum takeoff weight, of which over 1,500 kg (3,300 lb) is payload. Depending on variant, the Akıncı is equipped with two turboprop engines of either 450 hp (460 PS; 340 kW) or 750 hp (760 PS; 560 kW) or 850 hp (860 PS; 630 kW), as well as electronic support and ECM systems, dual satellite communication systems, air-to-air radar, collision avoidance radar, and advanced synthetic-aperture radar.

== Development ==
With the preliminary design phase completed in June 2019, Akıncı started engine ground run testing in August 2019 with a Ukrainian Ivchenko-Progress AI-450C turboprop engine. The first engine test was accomplished on September 1, 2019. Following the completion of other technical tests, the aircraft was moved to the Turkish Army's Çorlu Airfield Command. The UCAV made its maiden flight with automatic taxiing, take-off, 16-minute flight and successful landing on 6 December 2019.

Akıncı has a payload capacity of 881 lb (400 kg) internal and 2,094 lb (950 kg) external and a maximum combat load of 2,976 lb (1,350 kg). Powered by two 450 hp (460 PS; 340 kW) or 750 hp (760 PS; 560 kW) turboprop engines, the drone has a 66 ft (20 m) wingspan. It will be the first UAV capable of launching a cruise missile.

The first images of the UAV hit media reports in June 2018 and it was unveiled to the public during the Teknofest Aviation, Space and Technology Festival in September 2019.

On 22 April 2021, the Bayraktar Akıncı successfully conducted its first firing tests. During the tests, the aircraft was fitted with three different variants of the indigenously developed MAM-L smart munitions. These tests also featured the first public appearance of the ROKETSAN MAM-T smart munition. From 6-7 July, the aircraft completed a test flight of 25 hours and 45 minutes, flying 7,507 km (4,053 nmi; 4,665 mi) and reaching an altitude of 38,039 ft (11,594 m). On August 29, 2021, the Akıncı was added to the inventory of the Turkish armed forces.

The Akıncı is equipped with an indigenously manufactured active electronically scanned array (AESA) radar called MURAD, a SAR/GMTI radar, a surveillance system, electronic warfare, a signal intelligence suite, SATCOM, and ISTAR+C3.

=== Timeline ===
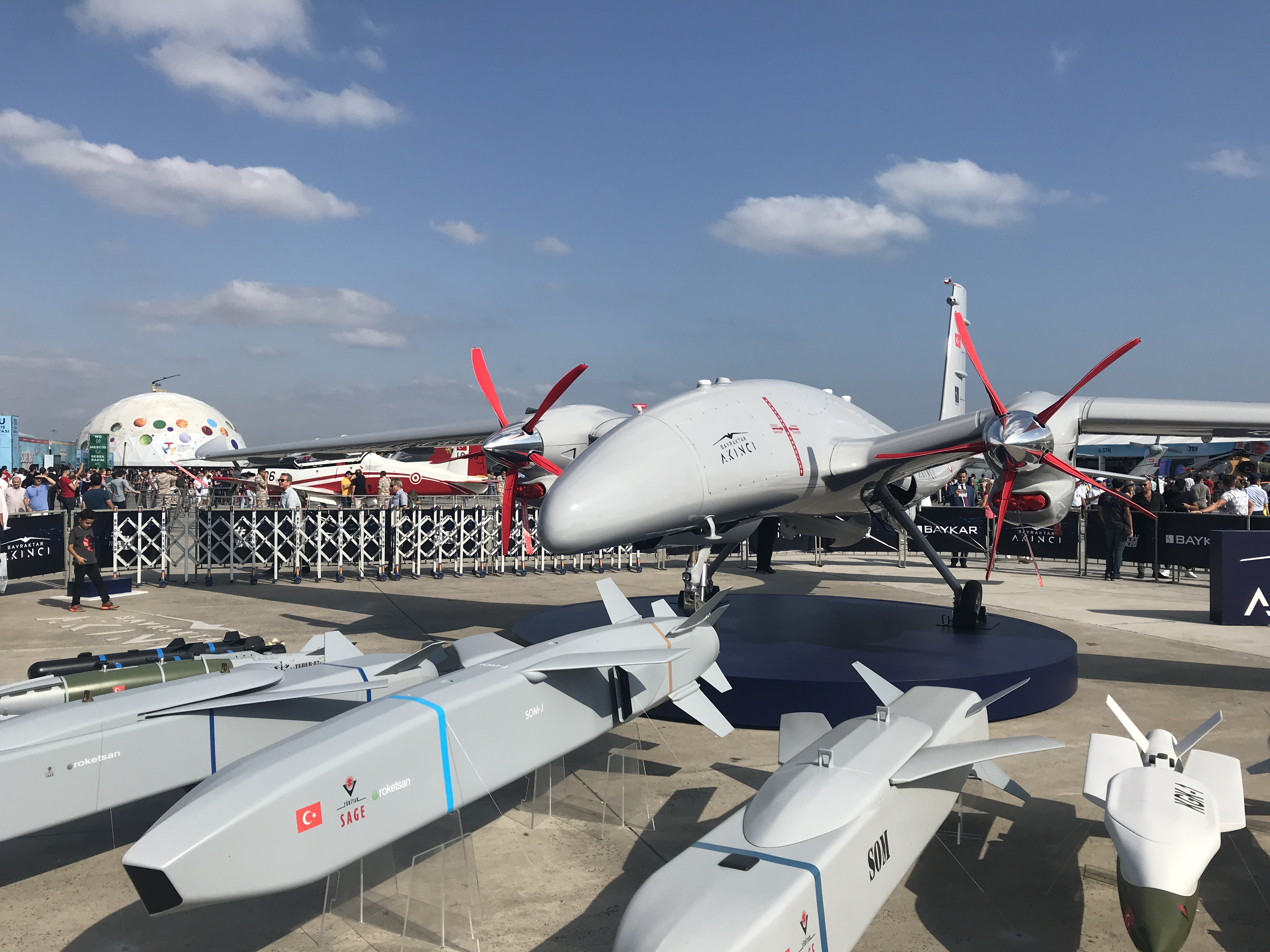
Bayraktar Akinci at Teknofest 2019

- On 6 December 2019, Bayraktar Akıncı made its maiden flight.
- On 10 January 2020, first prototype made its second flight and passed over 6000 ft.
- On 13 August 2020, second prototype made its maiden flights.
- On 19 August 2020, second prototype conducted medium altitude system integration flight tests.
- On 22 August 2020, first prototype exceeded 30.000 ft (9.144 m) during flight testing.
- On 5 September 2020, second prototype conducted high altitude and high speed flight tests.
- On 8–9 September 2020, Critical Design Review was conducted.
- On 11 September 2020, second prototype conducted medium altitude system integration flight tests.
- On 3 October 2020, second prototype 2 conducted asymmetric thrust tests.
- On 13 March 2021, Bayraktar Akıncı prototype 2 conducted its advanced system integration flight tests.
- On 27 March 2021, Bayraktar Akıncı prototype 3 conducted its maiden flight.
- On 10 April 2021, Bayraktar Akıncı prototype 3 conducted its medium altitude system integration flight tests.
- On 13 April 2021, Bayraktar Akıncı prototype 3 conducted its high altitude and high speed flight tests.
- On 22 April 2021, Bayraktar Akıncı conducted its first firing tests.
- On 19 May 2021, the first serial produced Bayraktar Akıncı conducted its maiden flight
- On 7 July 2021, Bayraktar Akıncı set the new national flight altitude record of Turkey by cruising at 38,039 feet (11,594 m) for 25 hours and 46 minutes at a distance of 7,507 km
- On 10 July 2021, Bayraktar Akıncı conducted a 13 hours and 24 minute long flight with 1360 kg payload. During the flight Akıncı was equipped with the NEB bunker buster bomb developed by TUBITAK SAGE. Marking the heaviest bomb ever carried by an UCAV
- On 29 August 2021, the first three units were delivered to the Turkish Armed Forces
- On 24 December 2021, two units were delivered to the Turkish Armed Forces
- On 23 January 2022, first export agreement of Bayraktar Akıncı was announced
- On 13 February 2022, Bayraktar Akıncı conducted its first combat mission
- On 2 March 2022, second export agreement of Bayraktar Akıncı was announced
- On 2 March 2022, the Baykar announced that the Bayraktar AKINCI-B version with twin 750 hp (560 kW) engines completed its maiden flight
- On 21 May 2022, the Bayraktar AKINCI crossed 3 countries (Turkey, Georgia, Azerbaijan), flying approximately 2000 km.
- On 14 June 2022, the Bayraktar AKINCI UCAV (Unmanned Combat Aerial Vehicle) has successfully completed its first firing test from 30 kilometers away with the KGK-SIHA-82 (Winged Guidance Kit) ammunition.
- On 21 June 2022, the Bayraktar AKINCI B Variant took off to carry out endurance, high altitude and high speed tests, The B Variant rose to an altitude of 45,118 feet (13,752 meters) within the scope of the test, returned to Bayraktar AKINCI Flight, Training and Test Center at Çorlu Airport Command after 20 hours and 23 minutes of flight.
- On 1 July 2022, the Bayraktar AKINCI carried out a test firing with the LGK-82 (Laser Guidance Kit), developed by ASELSAN, Flying at an altitude of 30 thousand feet, the target was laser-marked by Bayraktar TB2 SİHA, The LGK-82 was Launched from UAV for the first time.
- On 3 August 2022, three units were delivered to the Turkish Air Force
- On 24 August 2022, three additional units were delivered to the Turkish Armed Forces, bringing the number of drones operated by Turkey to 12
- On 22 February 2024, Akıncı equipped with ASELFLIR-500 shot a mobile Albatros USV.
- On 24 February 2024, Akıncı C variant successfully carried out its first flight test with two 850 HP engines.
- On 1 March 2025 Akıncı equipped with MURAD Aesa radar made its first maiden flight.

== Operational history ==
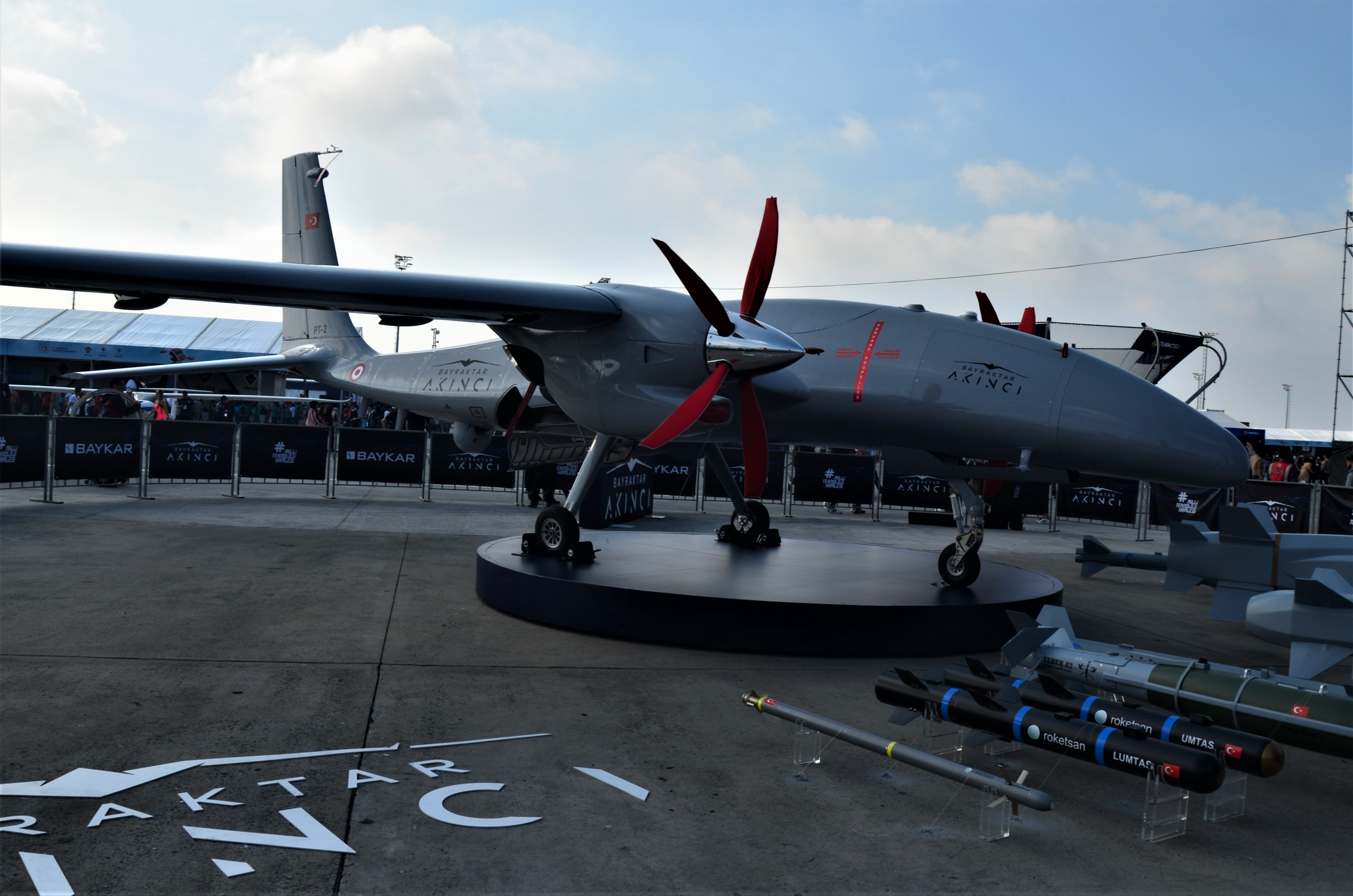
Bayraktar Akinci at Teknofest 2019

The Akıncı was first used in Pençe-Kilit operations by the Turkish military targeting PKK positions such as shelters and caves in northern Iraq.

Nine Akıncıs successfully flew over 1551 hours in the earthquake zone of the 2023 Turkey-Syria earthquake. The drones were instrumental in providing continuous updates and data to the crisis response team for damage detection, search and rescue support, and coordination activities.

In May 2024, an Akıncı assisted in finding the site of the 2024 Varzaqan helicopter crash which killed Iranian president Ebrahim Raisi and foreign minister Hossein Amir-Abdollahian. The mission reportedly lasted seven hours. Afterwards, the drone drew the star and crescent.

On 28 January 2025, a GNA Bayraktar Akıncı crashed approximately 15 kilometers west of Ajaylat in northwestern Libya. Video evidence showed smoke in the sky, suggesting the drone could have been hit by missile. The cause of its loss remains unknown.

On 16 March 2025, the People's Defense Forces (HPG) announced having shot down a Turkish Akıncı combat drone in the Qandil region of Iraq, showing footage of its wreckage. The drone reportedly crashed in the locality of Bingird, in the Ranya region.

On 31 March 2025, a Malian Air Force Akinci was shot down by the Algerian Territorial Air Defence Forces in Tinzaouaten.

On October 14, 2025, Rudaw reported that a Turkish-made Akıncı had crashed in the Qandil region of the Kurdistan Region in northern Iraq, between the villages of Pirdeşal and Zergelê. The incident was filmed by local civilians. According to the mayor of Qandil, Dilşêr Ibrahim, the crash site lies in a steep, mountainous area and no injuries or damage was reported.

On 17 March 2026, during the Sudanese civil war, a Sudanese Air Force Bayraktar Akıncı reportedly shot down another Akıncı over North Kordofan using a Roketsan EREN air-to-air missile. The downed Akıncı did not belong directly to the RSF. Khartoum claimed it had been operating for Emirati forces and had departed from Bahir Dar in Ethiopia; this was denied by Abu Dhabi. Infrared footage of the engagement was later released by Sudanese authorities and circulated by defense media outlets.

On 26 July 2026, the Yemeni rebel group Ansar Allah, also known as the Houthis, announced that it had shot down a Saudi Akıncı earlier that day in Al-Jawf governorate during the Houthi–Saudi Arabian conflict. It is not clear how it was shot down.

== Air to air combat in Sudan ==
During the Sudanese civil war, Sudanese Armed Forces' Bayraktar Akıncıs have reportedly been used to engage air to air combat with other UAVs operated by RSF. Independent sources claim Sudanese Akıncıs had shot down nearly 10 chinese made drones. SAF have been declaring that they have been shooting down CH-95/FH-95 drones that belonged to RSF.

== Operators ==
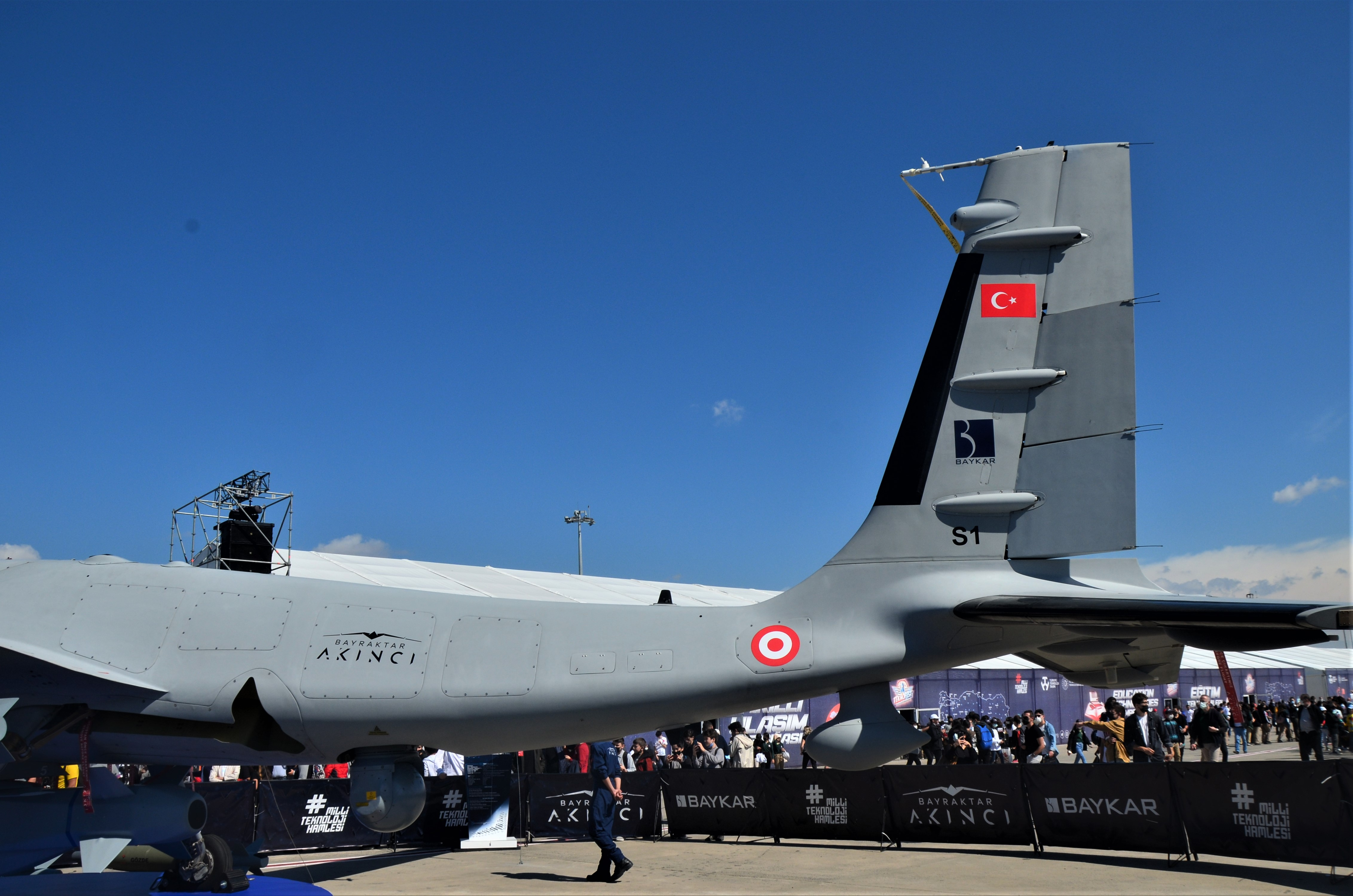
Tailfin of the Bayraktar Akinci at Teknofest 2021

=== Current operators ===
Turkey

- Turkish Land Forces – 8+ operational.
- Turkish Air Force – 6+ operational.
- Gendarmerie General Command - 3 operational.
- National Intelligence Organization (MIT) - 1 operational.

Azerbaijan

- Azerbaijan Air Force — 3

Burkina Faso

- Burkina Faso Armed Forces

Ethiopia

- Ethiopian Air Force

Libya

- Libyan Air Force – At least 1 Akıncı delivered.

Morocco

- Moroccan Armed Forces

Pakistan

- Pakistan Air Force – 6-7 Akıncı UAVs delivered during the first half of 2023.

Somalia

- Somali Air Force

United Arab Emirates

Saudi Arabia

- Royal Saudi Air Force

Sudan

- Sudanese Armed Forces

Mali

- Malian Air Force – Mali received two Bayraktar Akıncı-A drones in November 2024 as part of a partnership with the Turkish manufacturer Baykar. One of the aircraft was lost during a training exercise in January 2025. The second was shot down by Algerian armed forces in April 2025, following an incursion into Algerian airspace. 2 more delivered in 2026

=== Future operators ===
Indonesia

- Indonesian Air Force – During the visit of the Turkish president to Indonesia in February 2025, an agreement to acquire 9 Akinci drones and its joint production was signed.

Kyrgyzstan

- Kyrgyz Air Force

== Specifications ==
Data from Baykar Technology, Janes, Daily Sabah and Anadolu Agency

General characteristics

- Capacity: 1500 kg (3307 lb) payload
- Length: 12.2 m (40 ft 0 in)
- Wingspan: 20 m (65 ft 7 in)
- Height: 4.1 m (13 ft 5 in)
- Max takeoff weight: 6,000 kg (13,228 lb)
- Fuel capacity: unspecified Jet-A1 or JP-8 fuel capacity
- Powerplant: 2 × Ivchenko-Progress Motor Sich AI-450T turboprop engines for A variant, 340 kW (450 hp) each
- Powerplant: 2 × PT6A-135A turboprop engines for B variant, 560 kW (750 hp) each
- Powerplant: 2 × Pratt & Whitney Canada PT6 turboprop engines for C variant, 630 kW (850 hp) each
- Propellers: 5-bladed composite constant-speed propeller

Performance

- Maximum speed: 361 km/h (224 mph, 195 kn)
- Cruise speed: 280 km/h (170 mph, 150 kn)
- Range: 7,500 km (4,700 mi, 4,000 nmi) Traveled 7507 Kilometers in latest test.
- Endurance: 24+ hours
- Service ceiling: 13,716 m (45,000 ft)
- Operational altitude: 9,100 m (30,000 ft)

Armament

- Hardpoints: 8, with provisions to carry
  - Rockets
    - CIRIT
  - Missiles
    - Air-to-air missiles
      - GÖKTUĞ missile program
        - Akdoğan
        - Bozdoğan
        - Gökdoğan
        - Gökhan
    - Air-to-surface missiles
      - Akbaba
      - Çakır
      - SOM
      - TRG-230-İHA
      - İHA-300
      - TUBITAK-SAGE KUZGUN-TJ
      - TUBITAK-SAGE KUZGUN-KY
      - TUBITAK-SAGE KUZGUN-ER (According to TUBITAK-SAGE, this missile will be equivalent to the Penguin Missile.)
      - TUBITAK-SAGE KUZGUN-EW
      - UMTAS
      - Eren (jet-powered high-speed multi-purpose loitering munition)
    - Bombs
      - Teber-81 (Mark 81 bomb w/ ROKETSAN Laser Guidance Kit)
      - Teber-82 (Mark 82 bomb w/ ROKETSAN Laser Guidance Kit & Fixed Wing)
      - HGK-82 (Mark 82 bomb w/ TUBITAK-SAGE Precision Guidance Kit)
      - KGK-82 (Mark 82 bomb w/ TUBITAK-SAGE Wing Assisted Guidance Kit)
      - LGK-82 (Mark 82 bomb w/ Aselsan Laser Guidance Kit)
      - Teber-82 (Mark 82 bomb w/ ROKETSAN Laser Guidance Kit)
      - HGK-83 (Mark 83 bomb w/ TUBITAK-SAGE Precision Guidance Kit)
      - KGK-83 (Mark 83 bomb w/ TUBITAK-SAGE Wing Assisted Guidance Kit)
      - HGK-84 (Mark 84 bomb w/ TUBITAK-SAGE Precision Guidance Kit)
      - LHGK-84 (Mark 84 bomb w/ TUBITAK-SAGE Laser Sensitive Guidance Kit)
      - TUBITAK-SAGE TOGAN Rack of four 81 mm mortars (GPS/INS or unguided)
      - TUBITAK-SAGE KUZGUN-SS Glide bomb
      - Aselsan TOLUN Miniature Bomb (MB)
      - SARB-83 Bunker buster
      - NEB-84 Bunker buster
      - TUBITAK-SAGE BOZOK
      - TUBITAK-Gökçe
      - Alpagut (loitering munition)
      - MAM-C
      - MAM-L
      - MAM-T

Avionics

- Aselsan MURAD 100-A AESA radar
- Electro-optical reconnaissance, surveillance and targeting system:
  - Aselsan ASELFLIR 600 (option 1)
  - Aselsan ASELFLIR 500 (option 2)
  - Aselsan CATS (option 3)
- Electronic Warfare Pod
- National SIGINT module
- Fulmar 500-A Radar

== See also ==
- Baykar Bayraktar Mini UAV
- Baykar Bayraktar TB1
- Baykar Bayraktar TB2
- Baykar Bayraktar TB3
- Baykar Bayraktar Kızılelma
- TAI Anka
- TAI Aksungur
- TAI Anka 3
- Vestel Karayel
