= Regional Positioning and Timing System (Turkey) =

The Regional Positioning and Timing System (Turkish: Bölgesel Konumlama ve Zamanlama Sistemi), shortly BKZS, is a space-based project of the Turkish Armed Forces on global positioning and time transfer by satellite navigation system.

== Overview ==
The aim of the project is to provide positioning and timing information, which Turkish Armed Forces need during peace, crisis and military operations, independently from the existing foreign systems, which can be disabled in times of conflict. The project is developed by the Defence Technologies and Engineering Inc. (Savunma Teknolojileri ve Mühendislik A.Ş.) (STM), a subsidiary of the Undersecretariat for Defence Industries. In 2013, the project entered the first phase, comprising evaluation of the feasibility study. BKZS was named as one of the ten flagship goals of Türkiye’s National Space Program in 2021. An 8 satellite constellation with an estimated cost of $2.8 billion is planned.

== See also ==
- Quasi-Zenith Satellite System (QZSS)
- Indian Regional Navigation Satellite System (IRNSS, also known as NavIC)
