= HGK (bomb) =

Turkish precision-guided bomb kit

HGK - Hassas Güdüm Kiti - Precision Guided Munition Kit
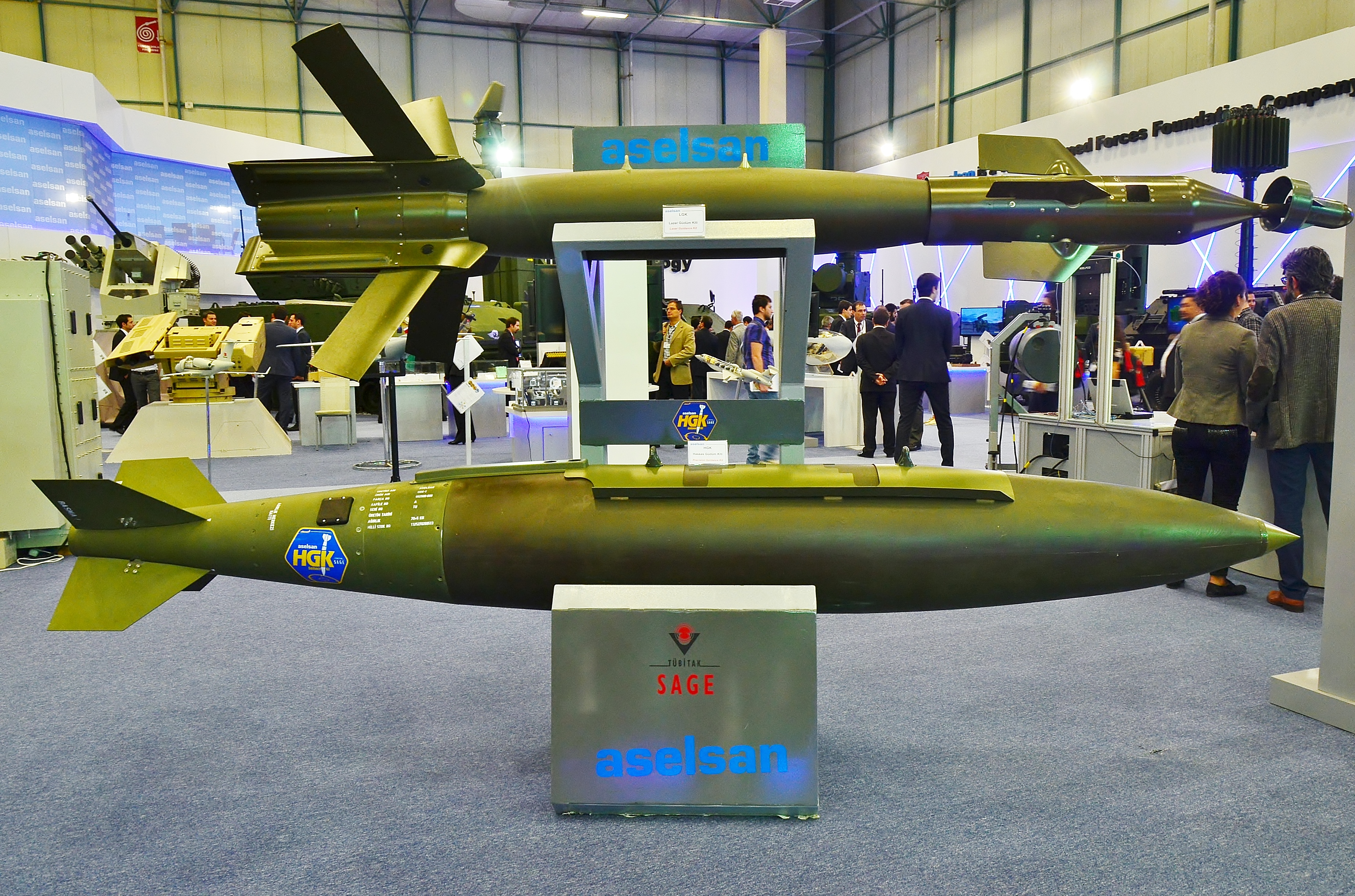
- Precision guidance kit HGK at the stand of TÜBİTAK during the IDEF 2015
- Type: Guided bomb
- Place of origin: Turkey

Service history
- In service: 2004
- Used by: Turkish Air Force

Production history
- Manufacturer: TÜBİTAK-SAGE

Specifications
- Mass: 500, 1000 or 2000 pounds
- Warhead: Mk.82, Mk.83 or Mk.84 warheads
- Operational range: 15nm (28km)
- Accuracy: 6 meters CEP (INS/GPS); 10 meters CEP (INS only)
- Launch platform: F-16; Baykar Bayraktar Akıncı; TAI TF-X; TAI Hürjet (HGK-83 and HGK-82 only); TAI Aksungur (HGK-83 and HGK-82 only); TAI Hürkuş (HGK-82 only)

The HGK guidance kit (HGK, Turkish: Hassas Güdüm Kiti / Precision Guidance Kit), developed by TÜBİTAK-SAGE, is a GPS/INS guidance kit that converted bombs ranging from 227 kg (500-lb) to 907 kg (2000-lb) Mark 80-series munitions into smart bombs. A CAMGÖZ (glass eye) laser seeker, resistant to countermeasures, and with over 315 degrees of view angle. It enabled precise strike capability in all weather conditions with long range (up to 24 km) at a dispersion of 6 m (20 ft).

The kit could be used with Mark 84, Mark 83, and Mark 82 bombs.
