= FL-71 =

Chinese Unmanned combat aerial vehicle

FL-71 (Fei Long-71)

General information
- Type: Unmanned combat aerial vehicle
- National origin: China
- Manufacturer: Zhong Tian Guide Control Technology Company
- Designer: Zhong Tian Guide Control Technology Company
- Status: in development

History
- Manufactured: 2018

FL-71 is a Chinese Unmanned combat aerial vehicle unveiled at the 2018 Zhuhai Airshow.

The aircraft features stealth technology, including for the engine exhaust. It has a fuselage with stealth shaping, trapezoidal wings.

== Specification ==
Data from asianmilitaryreview
defense-update

General characteristics

- Crew: 0
- Capacity: 0
- Gross weight: 22,000 kg (48,502 lb)
- Max takeoff weight: 28,000 kg (61,729 lb)

Performance

- Maximum speed: 2,200 km/h (1,400 mph, 1,200 kn)
- Maximum speed: Mach 1,8
- Range: 7,000 km (4,300 mi, 3,800 nmi)
- Service ceiling: 15,000 m (49,000 ft)

Armament
Bombs missiles and more
