= GÖKTUĞ =

Turkish air-to-air missile program

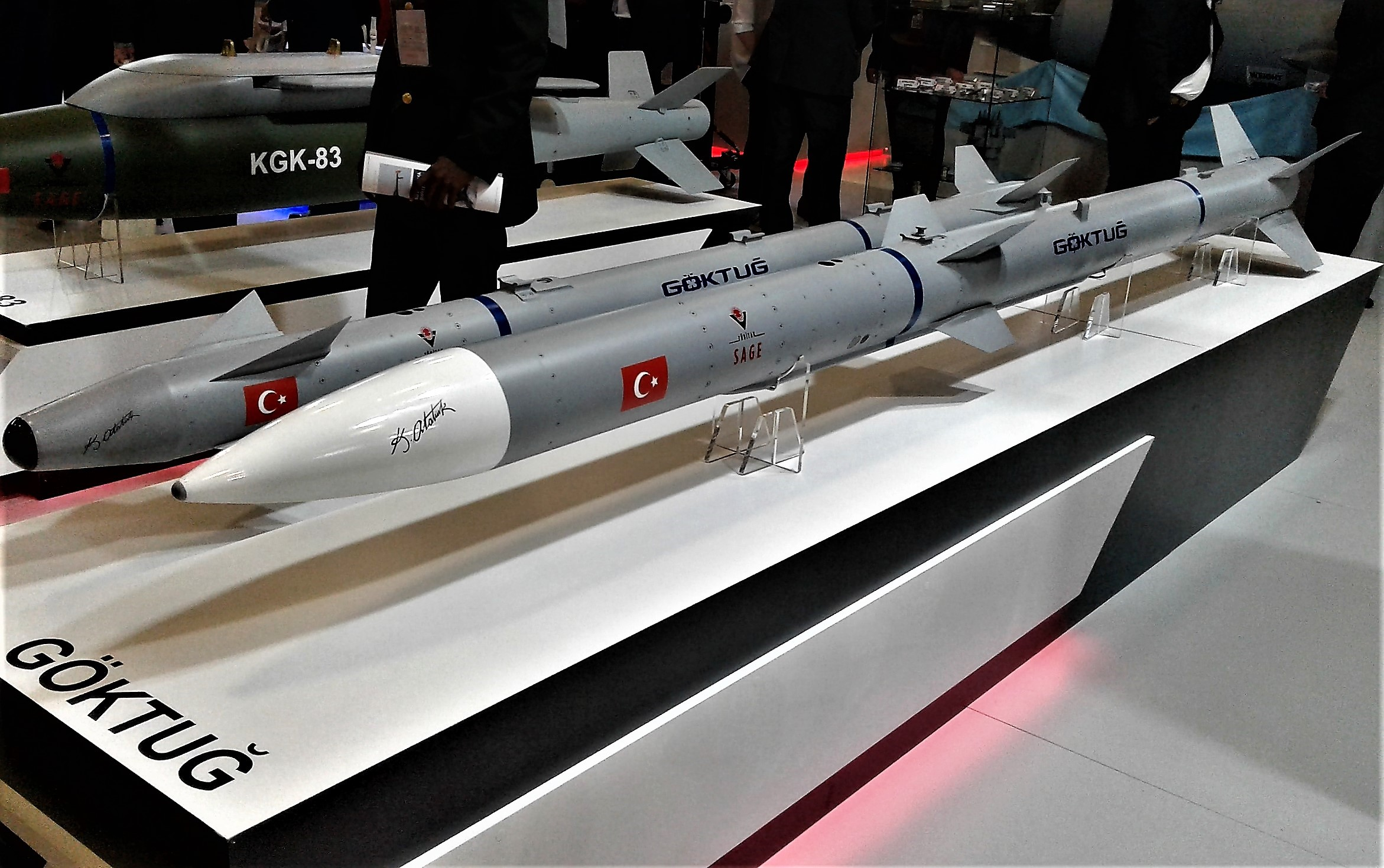
Merlin and Peregrine air-to-air missiles at the IDEF 2019 in Istanbul, Turkey.

GÖKTUĞ (combination of GÖK (sky) and TUĞ, Tug banner) is a Turkish weapons program started in 2013 by TÜBİTAK-SAGE to develop four variants of air-to-air missiles intended to be launched from F-16s, future Turkish indigenous TAI Hürjet and TAI TF Kaan combat aircraft, and combat aircraft from other nations such as CAC/PAC JF-17 Thunder. The program intends to produce Turkey's first indigenous air-to-air missiles. Bozdoğan (Merlin) is short-range infrared homing missile and Gökdoğan (Peregrine) is a beyond-visual-range active radar homing missile. Other projects include Gökhan, a ramjet-powered beyond-visual-range air-to-air missile and a very-short-range miniature air-to-air missile for helicopters.

The Merlin and Peregrine missiles were successfully flight-tested in 2018. These missiles are planned to replace the AIM-9 Sidewinder and AIM-120 AMRAAM, respectively, on Turkey's crewed warplanes, and are planned to be integrated on Bayraktar AKINCI and Bayraktar Kızılelma, indigenously developed Turkish UCAVs. It was announced that preparations for mass production have begun in 2022. Both Merlin and Peregrine missiles entered inventory on 30 July 2024.

== Bozdoğan (Merlin) ==
Bozdoğan (Merlin), is a short-range air-to-air missile developed by the Turkish state institution TÜBİTAK SAGE. The missile is developed under the GÖKTUĞ program starting in 2013. The missile uses an off-boresight capable IIR (Imaging infrared) seeker with all aspect engagement capability and counter-countermeasure capability. The missile has high-thrust reduced smoke solid propellant technology and an electronic rocket motor aiming and firing system. According to the manufacturer, it will have advanced agility due to use of thrust vectoring, a unique warhead for maximum probability of kill and a reliable fuze. The missile compatible with MIL-STD-1553 and MIL-STD-1760 and is designed for use with the LAU-129 guided missile launcher and has a range of 25+ km.

On 14 April 2021, Bozdoğan conducted a live firing test from a Turkish Air Force F-16. The missile successfully destroyed a TAI Şimşek target drone. Bozdoğan reaches a speed of greater than Mach 4. It was announced that preparations for mass production have begun in 2022. The first prototype contract for the supply of the missile to the Turkish Air Force was made in 2023. The project scope includes integrating the Bozdoğan and Gökdoğan Missiles into the PO-III configuration of F-16 aircraft and to procure 25 Bozdoğan missiles, 25 Gökdoğan missiles and 14 launchers, with first delivery in 2025. According to Mehmet Fatih Kacır, both missiles have been received. The Bozdoğan missile will also be used in the air defense system Göksur, developed by Aselsan. The Göksur system successfully completed its first firing test in February 2025.

== Gökdoğan (Peregrine) ==
Gökdoğan (peregrine) is a beyond-visual-range air-to-air missile developed by TÜBİTAK SAGE, also developed under the GÖKTUĞ program from 2013. The contract for the development of the missile was signed in 2013. The missile was first successfully flight-tested in 2018. It has a solid-state active radio frequency smart seeker with fire and forget capability and electronic counter-countermeasures, It uses all aspect engagement capable home on jam capability, using an update-capable tactical data link to enable lock-on after launch. In the words of the manufacturer, it has high thrust, with reduced smoke solid propellant technology and an electronic rocket motor arming and firing system. It too has a design to maximize probability of kill and a reliable fuze. Gökdoğan is compatible with MIL-STD-1553 and MIL-STD-1760 and is designed for use with the LAU-129 guided missile launcher. The missile has an official range of 65+ km.

It was announced that preparations for mass production have begun in 2022. The first prototype contract for the supply of the missile to the Turkish Air Force was made in 2023. Gökdoğan successfully hit a target aircraft in a test conducted in February 2025. The planned Gökdoğan-ER features a dual-pulse solid rocket motor and an estimated range exceeding 180 km (110 mi), making it comparable to the Astra Mk-II and PL-15.

== Gökhan (Khan of Sky) ==
The Gökhan is a Turkish ramjet-powered beyond-visual-range air-to-air missile conceptually modeled after the MBDA Meteor and developed jointly by Roketsan and TAPSAN. Designed for sustained Mach 4+ cruise speeds and an operational range of 200–250 km (120–160 mi), it completed aerodynamic trials at TÜBİTAK SAGE ahead of planned flight tests aboard a modified F-16. A planned extended-range variant, the Gökhan-ER, is projected to reach up to 400 km (250 mi) for integration onto indigenous platforms such as the TAI TF Kaan and TAI Hürjet.

The development of an air-to-air missile powered by a ramjet engine was officially announced in August 2021. The director of the TÜBİTAK SAGE Gürcan Okumuş stated the completion of more than 100 tests that carried the firing of the new ramjet engine.
