= Ivchenko-Progress AI-222 =

Turbofan aircraft engine

AI-222
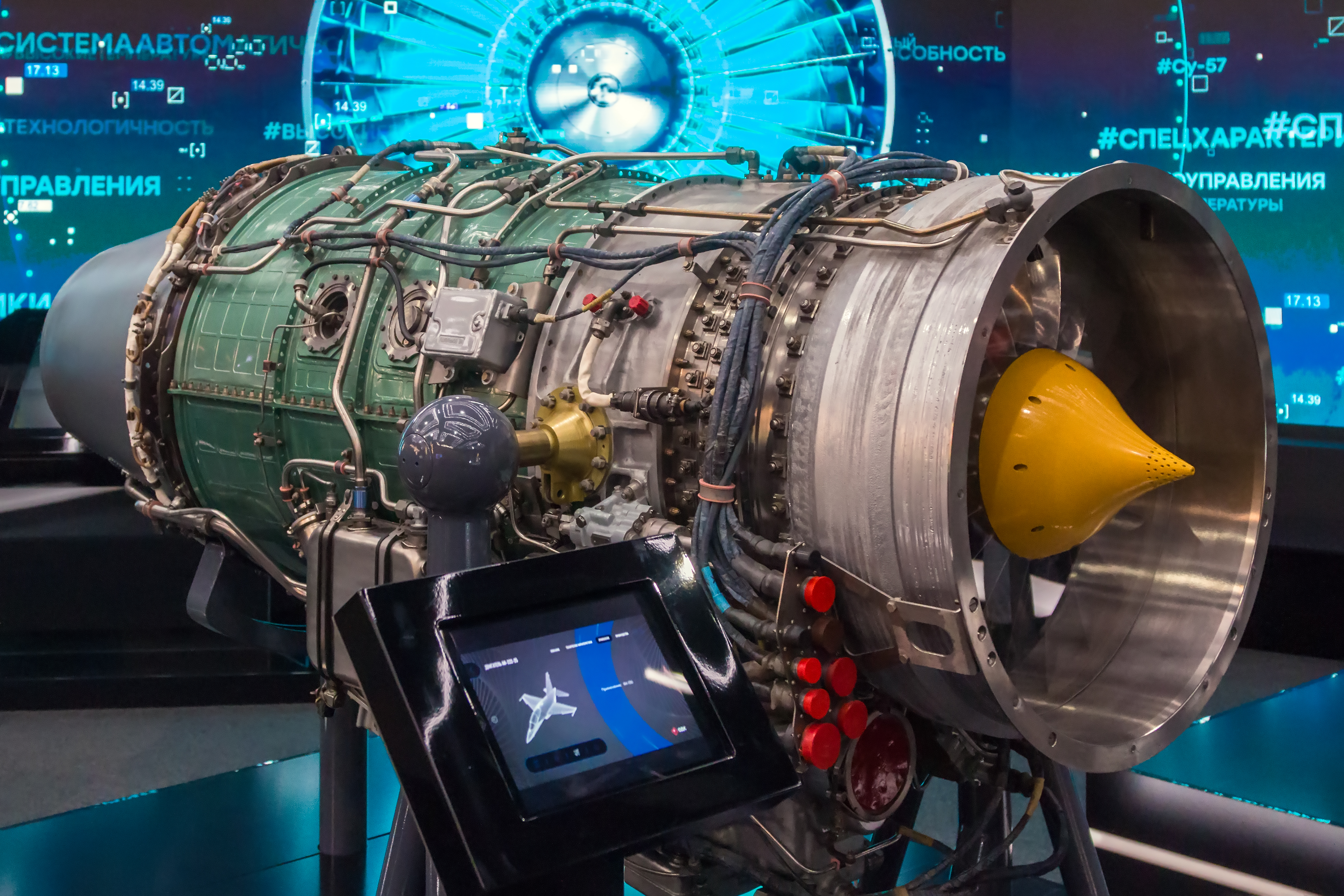
- Type: Turbofan
- National origin: Ukraine / Russia
- Designer: Ivchenko-Progress
- Built by: Motor Sich; FGUP Saljut
- First run: 2003
- Major applications: Hongdu JL-10; Yakovlev Yak-130
- Developed from: Progress AI-22
- Developed into: Progress Al-322; Salyut SM-100

The Ivchenko-Progress AI-222 (Ukrainian: AI-222, Russian: АИ-222-25) is a family of low-bypass turbofan engines.

== Design and development ==
The development of the engine started at Ivchenko-Progress of Zaporizhzhia, Ukraine in 1999. The engine was originally intended for the Yakovlev Yak-130 trainer aircraft. An afterburning version, the AI-222-25F (from Russian/Ukrainian term "Форсаж") is also available with thrust vectoring.

In 2015, Russian manufacturer "Saljut" began to produce AI-222-25 without any Ukrainian involvement.

== Variants ==
AI-222-25
AI-222-25F
AI-222-25KVT
AI-222-25KFK
AI-222-28
AI-222-28F

== Applications ==
- Hongdu JL-10 (L-15)
- Yakovlev Yak-130

== Specifications (AI-222-25) ==
Data from

==== General characteristics ====
- Type: Two-spool low-bypass turbofan
- Length: 1,960 mm (77.17 in)
- Diameter: 640 mm (25.20 in)
- Dry weight: 440 kg (970.03 lb) in base configuration, 560 kg (1,234.59 lb) in afterburning configuration

==== Components ====
- Compressor: axial, 2-stage LP compressor and 8-stage HP compressor
- Combustors: annular
- Turbine: 1-stage HP, 1-stage LP

==== Performance ====
- Maximum thrust: 2520 kgf / 24.7 kN (5,552.78 lbf) in takeoff mode (non-afterburning), 4200 kgf / 41.2 kN (9,262.13 lbf) afterburning.
- Overall pressure ratio: 15.43:1
- Bypass ratio: 1.19:1
- Turbine inlet temperature: 1,470 K (1,200 °C)
- Specific fuel consumption: 0.66 kg/(kgf h)
- Thrust-to-weight ratio: 5.68 (non-afterburning), 7.5 (afterburning)

== See also ==
Related development

- Ivchenko-Progress AI-322
- Progress AI-22
- Progress D-27

Comparable engines

- HAL HTFE-25
- Honeywell/ITEC F124
- IHI Corporation XF5
- Lotarev DV-2
- Rolls-Royce Turbomeca Adour
- TEI-TF6000

Related lists

- List of aircraft engines
