= TEI-TF35000 =

Turbofan engine developed by Tusaş Engine Industries

- Type: Turbofan
- National origin: Turkey
- Manufacturer: Tusaş Engine Industries (TEI)
- Designer: Tusaş Engine Industries; TRMOTOR
- Major applications: TAI TF Kaan

TEI-TF35000 is a turbofan engine developed by the Turkish cooperation of Tusaş Engine Industries (TEI) and TRMOTOR, designed to deliver 35,000 pounds-force of thrust. The engine is primarily intended for use in Turkish fifth generation aircraft TAI TF Kaan. The TF35000 forms part of Turkey's complete initiative for self-sufficiency in advanced defense technologies.

== Design and development ==
On 8 November 2018, an agreement was signed between the Turkish Defense Industry Presidency and TRMOTOR to develop a domestic engine for TAI TF Kaan. In 2021, TEI and TRMOTOR decided to form a partnership in engine development.

The status of the studies for the production of a Turkish-made engine for KAAN was announced with the introduction of the TEI-TF6000 engine. It was stated that the TF-6000 and the TF10000 engine developed in parallel with it were preliminary preparations for a more powerful and larger engine. On 15 May 2025, both TEI and TRMOTOR announced the TF35000 engine on their websites and showed the design of the engine for the first time.

TEI CEO, who attended the Paris Air Show on June 23, 2025, stated that they have been working on the design of the engine for a long time and have reached the end of the design phase. He continued his statement by saying that the first prototype production is planned for the end of 2025, the first tests in 2026 and the integration into Kaan in 2032. TEI CEO Akşit announced at a trade fair he attended in September 2025 that the TF-35000 will not be a large-scale copy of the TF-10000, but will be a fifth-generation fighter jet engine incorporating new technologies.

In February 2026, TEI General Manager Prof. Dr. Mahmut Faruk Akşit announced that the TF-35000 engine had entered the Critical Design Review (CDR) phase.

A parallel turbofan engine project, designated GÜÇHAN, is being developed by the Turkish Ministry of National Defence Research and Development Center. The engine is reported to generate 42,000 lbf (187 kN) of thrust. As of 2026, six prototype engines had reportedly been manufactured, with qualification testing scheduled to begin in 2026.

== See also ==
Related development

- TEI-TF6000
- TEI-TF10000

Comparable engines

- Eurojet EJ200
- Snecma M88
- Pratt & Whitney F119
- Pratt & Whitney F135
- General Electric F110
- Saturn AL-51
- Shenyang WS-15

Related lists

- List of aircraft engines
