= Ivchenko-Progress AI-322 =

Ukrainian afterburning turbofan engine

AI-322
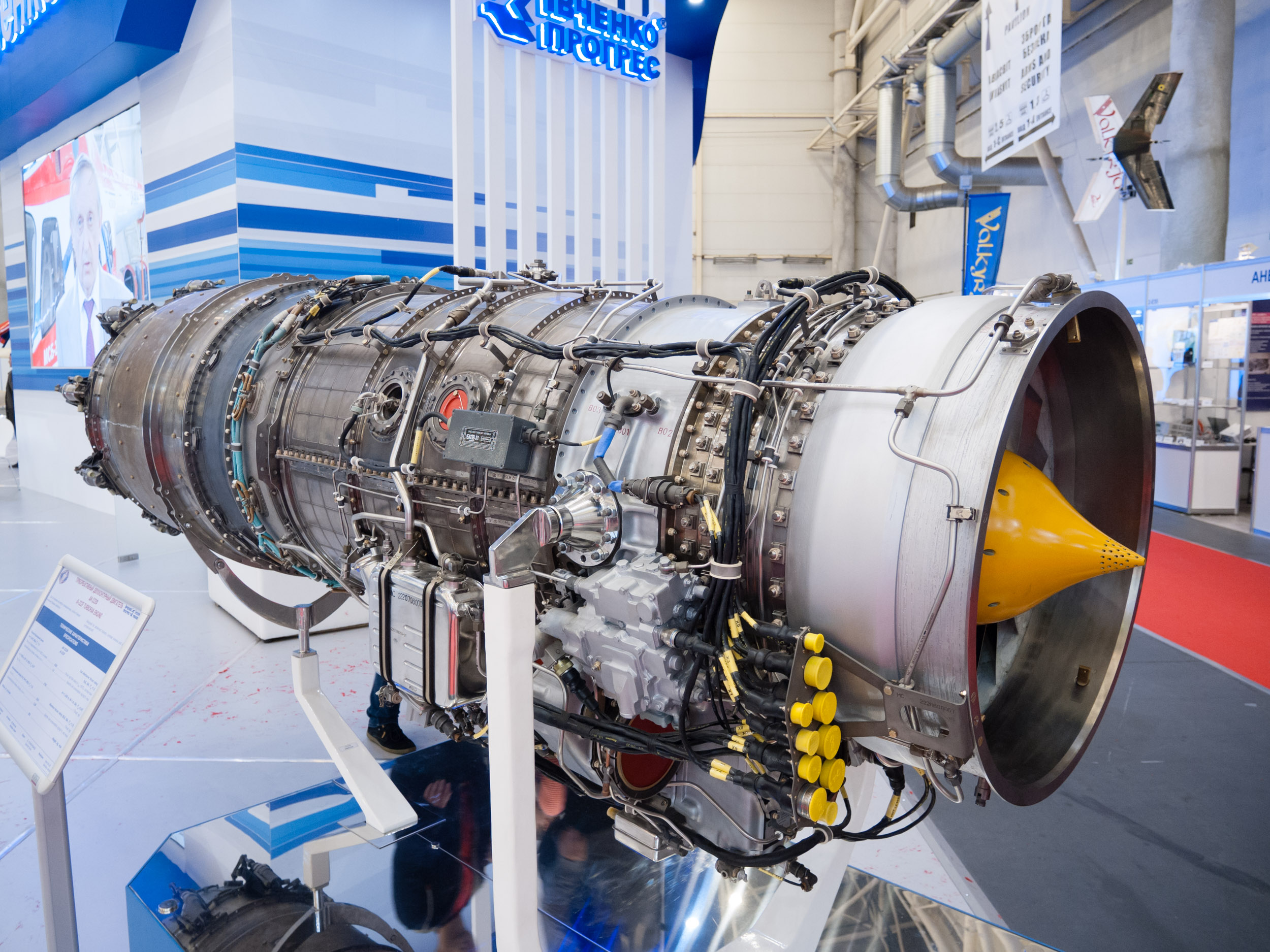
- Ivchenko-Progress AI-322F
- Type: Turbofan
- National origin: Ukraine
- Designer: Ivchenko-Progress
- Built by: Motor Sich
- Major applications: Baykar Bayraktar Kızılelma
- Developed from: Ivchenko-Progress AI-222

The Ivchenko-Progress AI-322 (Ukrainian: AI-322, Russian: АИ-322) are a family of low-bypass turbofan engines developed from the AI-222 engine.

== Design and development ==
The development of the engine continues at Ivchenko-Progress of Zaporizhzhia, Ukraine. The engine was originally intended for the Hongdu L-15 trainer aircraft and it is now planned to be used in Baykar Bayraktar Kızılelma fighter UAV. An afterburning version, the AI-322F is also available.

== Variants ==
AI-322
AI-322F

== Applications ==
- Baykar Bayraktar Kızılelma
- Hongdu L-15
- TAI Anka-3

== Specifications (AI-322F) ==
Data from

==== General characteristics ====
- Type: Two-spool low-bypass turbofan
- Length: 1,960 mm (77 in)
- Diameter: 640 mm (25 in)
- Dry weight: 440 kg (970 lb) in base configuration, 560 kg (1,230 lb) in afterburning configuration

==== Components ====
- Compressor: axial, 2-stage LP compressor and 8-stage HP compressor
- Combustors: annular
- Turbine: 1-stage HP, 1-stage LP

==== Performance ====
- Maximum thrust: 2,500 kgf (24.5 kN; 5,511.6 lbf) in takeoff mode (non-afterburning), 4,200 kgf (41.2 kN; 9,259.4 lbf) afterburning.
- Overall pressure ratio: 15.43:1
- Bypass ratio: 1.19:1
- Turbine inlet temperature: 1,470 K (1,200 °C)
- Fuel consumption: 0.66 kg/kgf.h (18.7 g/kNs) (non-afterburning), 1.9 kg/kgf.h (53.8 g/kNs) (afterburning)
- Specific fuel consumption: 0.66 kg/(kgf h)
- Thrust-to-weight ratio: 5.68 (non-afterburning), 7.5 (afterburning)

== See also ==
Related development

- Ivchenko-Progress AI-222

Comparable engines

- HAL HTFE-25
- Honeywell/ITEC F124
- IHI Corporation XF5
- Lotarev DV-2
- Rolls-Royce Turbomeca Adour
- TEI-TF6000

Related lists

- List of aircraft engines
