= Progress AI-22 =

2000s Ukrainian/Russian turbofan aircraft engine

- Type: Turbofan
- National origin: Ukraine, Russia
- Manufacturer: ZMKB Progress, Motor Sich JSC, KMPO, KAPO
- First run: September 26, 2000
- Developed from: DV-2
- Developed into: AI-222

The Progress AI-22 is a turbofan engine, developed by ZMKB Progress, Motor Sich JSC, KMPO and KAPO.

== Development ==
The AI-22 was developed in the 1990s and is designed for the Tupolev Tu-324 regional airliner.

The engine is based on a gas generator version of the DV-2 engine. It has a modular design consisting of 10 modules. Materials and special coatings of parts allow the engine to operate in various climatic conditions.

A successful start of a full-size engine was made on September 26, 2000. Further development of the engine is suspended indefinitely.

=== Organisation ===
The AI-22 is created in a cooperation of four enterprises:

- ZMKB Progress is tasked with the manufacturing of external piping and cabling. It also conducts tests and performs the final assembly of the engine.
- Motor Sich JSC is tasked with the manufacturing of the high-pressure compressor, combustion chamber, high-pressure turbine, air starter, air separator, start valve, air bypass valve, parts for piping, and fasteners used in the assembly of the engine.
- KMPO is tasked with the manufacturing of the low-pressure compressor and fan, the low-pressure turbine, middle and rear support, transmission units, engine mountings, and oil system units.
- KAPO is tasked with the manufacturing of the thrust reverser, jet nozzle, and cowlings.

=== Emissions ===
The specific emissions of the engine during the landing and takeoff cycle are as follows:

- CO = 110 g/kN
- HC = 12 g/kN
- NOx = 45 g/kN
- SN = 20 g/kN

== Applications ==
- Tupolev Tu-324 (proposed)
- Yakovlev Yak-48 (proposed)

== Specifications (AI-22) ==
Data from ivchenko-progress.com, aviaros.narod.ru and trade.tatcenter.ru

==== General characteristics ====
- Type: Two-spool turbofan engine
- Length: 3,060 mm (120 in)
- Diameter: 1,020 mm (40 in) (fan)
- Dry weight: 765 kg (1,687 lb)

==== Components ====
- Compressor: Fan & 5LP + 7HP
- Combustors: Annular with 16 nozzles
- Turbine: 1HP + 3LP
- Fuel type: T-1, TS-1 or RT kerosene type fuel

==== Performance ====
- Maximum thrust:
  - 4,340 kgf (42.6 kN; 9,600 lbf) in maximum emergency mode
  - 3,820 kgf (37.5 kN; 8,400 lbf) in takeoff mode
  - 840 kgf (8.2 kN; 1,900 lbf) in maximum cruising mode
  - 775 kgf (7.60 kN; 1,710 lbf) in cruising mode
- Overall pressure ratio:
  - 15.49 in takeoff mode
  - 19.16 in cruising mode
- Bypass ratio:
  - 4.94 in takeoff mode
  - 4.57 in cruising mode
- Air mass flow:
  - 125.85 kg/s (277.5 lb/s) in takeoff mode
  - 45.6 kg/s (101 lb/s) in cruising mode
- Turbine inlet temperature:
  - 1,450 °C (2,640 °F) in takeoff mode
  - 1,249 °C (2,280 °F) in cruising mode
- Specific fuel consumption: 0.63 kg/(kgf⋅h) in cruising mode

== See also ==
Related lists

- List of aircraft engines
