= Tusaş Engine Industries =

Turkish Engine Manufacturer

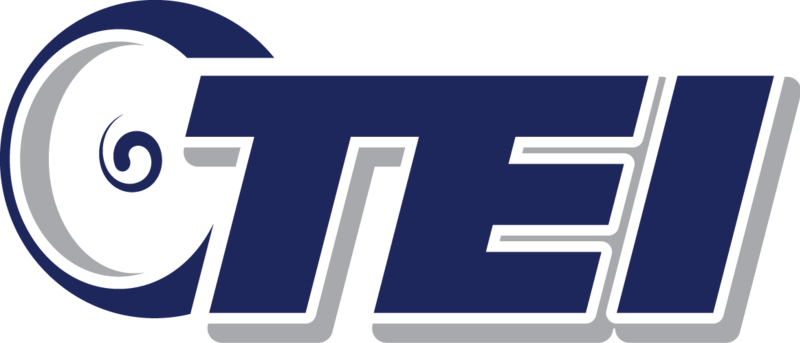

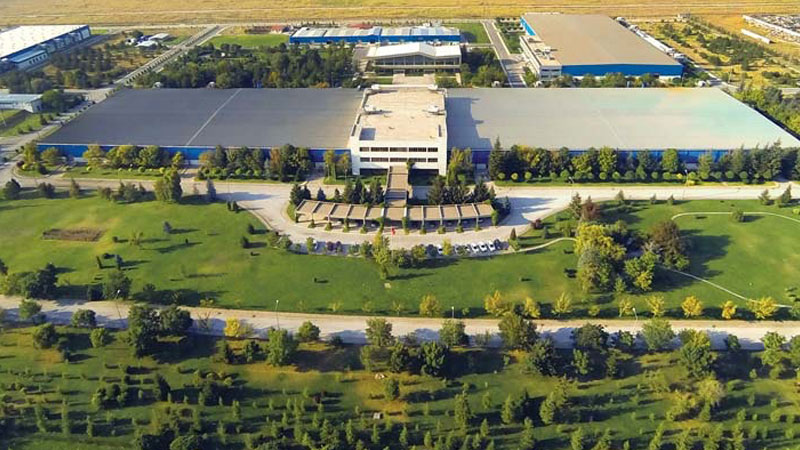
- Headquarters complex in Eskişehir
- Trade name: TEI
- Company type: Incorporated company
- Industry: Aerospace
- Founded: 1985; 41 years ago
- Headquarters: Eskişehir, Turkey
- Key people: Mahmut Faruk Akşit (CEO)
- Number of employees: 4000
- Website: tei.com.tr/en

Tusaş Engine Industries (TEI; Turkish: TUSAŞ Motor Sanayii A.Ş.) is an aerospace engine manufacturer and a design center for the production of engines and engine parts for commercial and military aircraft. It is based in Eskişehir, Turkey.

TEI was founded in 1985 as a joint venture between Turkish Aerospace Industries (50.5%) and GE Aerospace (46.2%), the Turkish Armed Forces Foundation, and the Turkish Aeronautical Association(3.3%).

== History ==
The company started with component manufacturing for the General Electric F110 engines in the F-16 aircraft of the Turkish Air Force. Since 2010, great importance has been given to domestic design and a large amount of resources have been allocated. TEI designed 13 engines in a 10-year period between 2014 and 2024. Flights were carried out with 7 of these engines. 6 of them entered mass production. TEI is developing Türkiye's first turbofan engine, TEI-TF6000. The company's long-term goal is for Türkiye to become a self-sufficient country in the field of aviation engines.

TEI's employee count was 1,200 in 2014. This number increased to 4,000 in 2025. In 2014, 70 percent of employees were blue-collar. By 2025, 57 percent of employees were white-collar. In 2024, the company achieved $400 million worth of exports. In 2025, the company announced that it would produce the TF-35000, which will be the engine for Türkiye's domestically produced TAI Kaan fighter jet.

== Products and projects ==
=== Indigenous engines ===
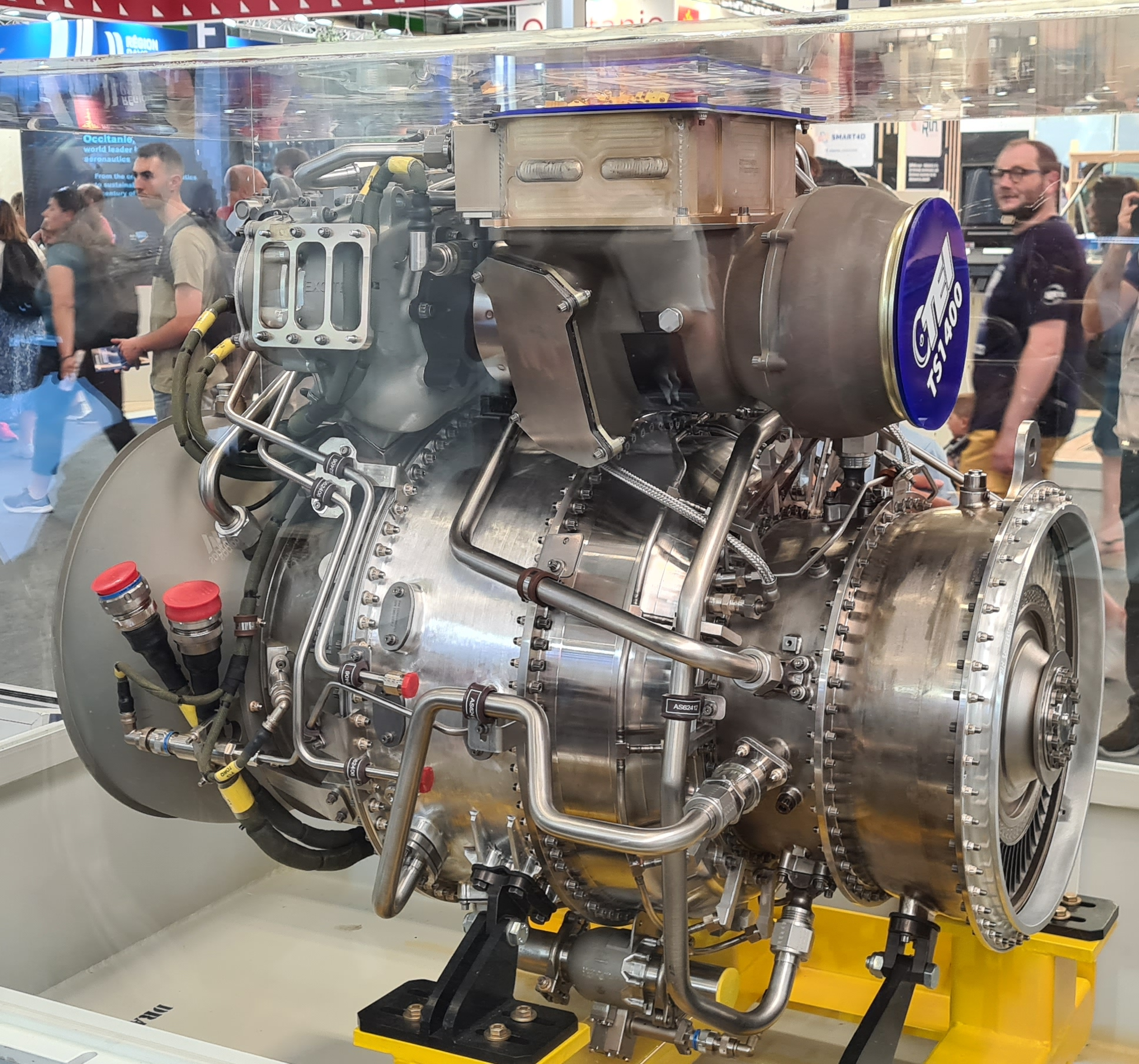
TEI TS1400 Engine

- TEI-PD170 turbodiesel aviation engines for the TAI Anka UAVs
- TEI-PD222ST turbodiesel aviation engine
- TEI-PG50 2-stroke gasoline aviation engine
- TEI-PG50S 2-stroke gasoline aviation engine
- TEI-TJ300 turbojet medium range anti-ship missile engine
- TEI-TJ90 turbojet engine for UAVs, including TAI Şimşek target drone
- TEI-TJ35 turbojet engine
- TEI-TP38 turboprop engine
- TEI TS1400 turboshaft aviation engine for rotary wing applications such as the TAI T625 Gökbey, T-129 ATAK
- TEI TS3000 turboshaft aviation engine for rotary wing applications such as the TAI T925, TAI T929 ATAK 2
- TEI-TF6000 turbofan engine
- TEI-TF10000 turbofan engine
- TEI-TF35000 turbofan engine

=== Licensed engines ===
- General Electric T700 (T700-TEI-701D variant) for the T-70, a local variant of the S-70 Black Hawk
- General Electric F110 engines (Original Equipment Manufacturer)
- LHTEC T800 turboshaft engines for rotary wing applications such as the T-129 Atak

=== Parts and modules ===
- CFM International LEAP
- General Electric GEnx
- CFM International CFM56
- General Electric GE90
- General Electric GE9X
- General Electric T700 (T700-TEI-701D variant)
- Europrop TP400 (Engine of the Airbus A400M Atlas)
- Also for many other engines
