= TEI-TF10000 =

Turbofan engine

- Type: Turbofan
- National origin: (Turkey)
- Manufacturer: TEI
- First run: Under development
- Status: Under development
- Developed from: TEI-TF6000

The TF-10000 is a Turkish 10,000 lbs turbofan engine based on TEI-TF6000 and developed by the Tusaş Engine Industries. The main goal of the project is gaining experience for the development of an advanced combat aircraft-capable engine, TEI-TF35000 - which will be the main engine for Kaan aircraft - and an indigenous engine for light combat aircraft. It is firstly introduced in 12 December 2022 and it is stated by Mahmut Akşit that TF10000 maybe used for Bayraktar Kızılelma.

== History and development ==
On 12 December 2022, the ninth innovation week, TF10000 made its first appearance. The engine is still under development.

Development of the afterburning TF10000 turbofan engine, derived from the TEI-TF6000 core architecture, continued during the mid-2020s.

TEI General Manager Prof. Dr. Mahmut F. Akşit stated that the first ignition test of the engine with its afterburner section was targeted for late 2027.

Akşit stated that completion of the milestone would mark the first successful operation of an indigenous Turkish afterburning military turbofan engine.

== Specifications ==
Per TEI:

- Technical Specifications Thurst (SLS, ISA): 6.000
- (Dry) / 10.000 (Wet) lbf
- Dimensions (WidthxHeightxLength): 870x1150x3150mm
- By-pass Ratio (SLS, ISA): 1
- Configuration Fan: 2 Stage Axial
- Compressor: 6 Stage Axial
- Turbine: 1 Stage HPT - 1 Stage LPT
- Combustion Chamber: Through Flow
