= Hongdu JL-10 =

Chinese supersonic advanced training and light combat aircraft

JL-10 / L-15
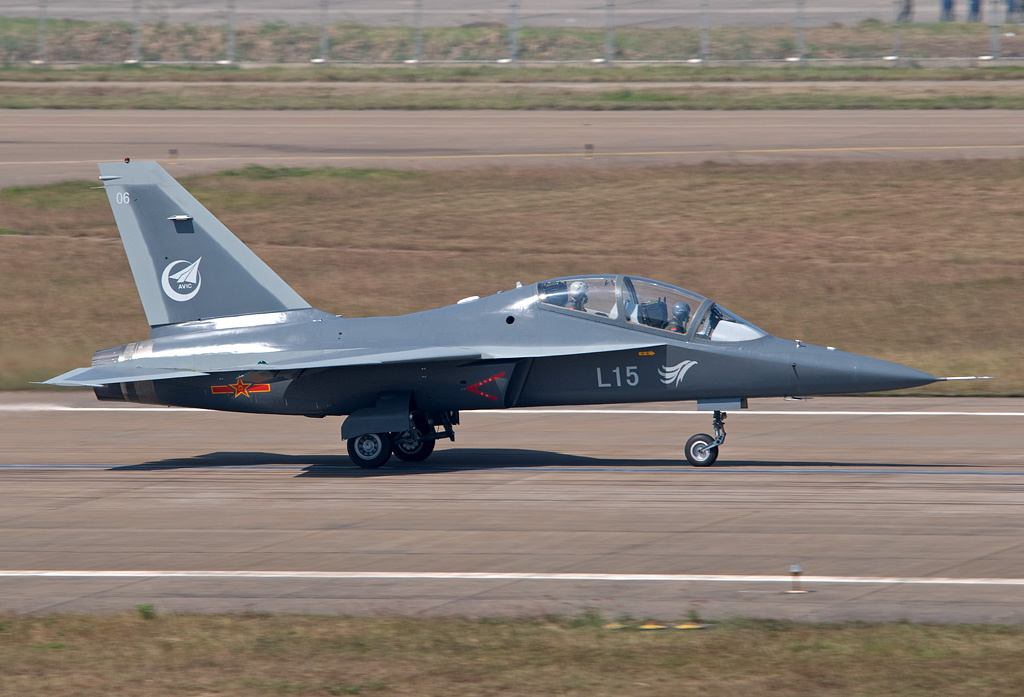

General information
- Type: Advanced jet trainer Light combat aircraft
- Manufacturer: Hongdu Aviation Industry Corporation
- Designer: AVIC II; Yakovlev
- Status: In service
- Primary users: People's Liberation Army Air Force United Arab Emirates Air Force

History
- Introduction date: 2013
- First flight: March 13, 2006

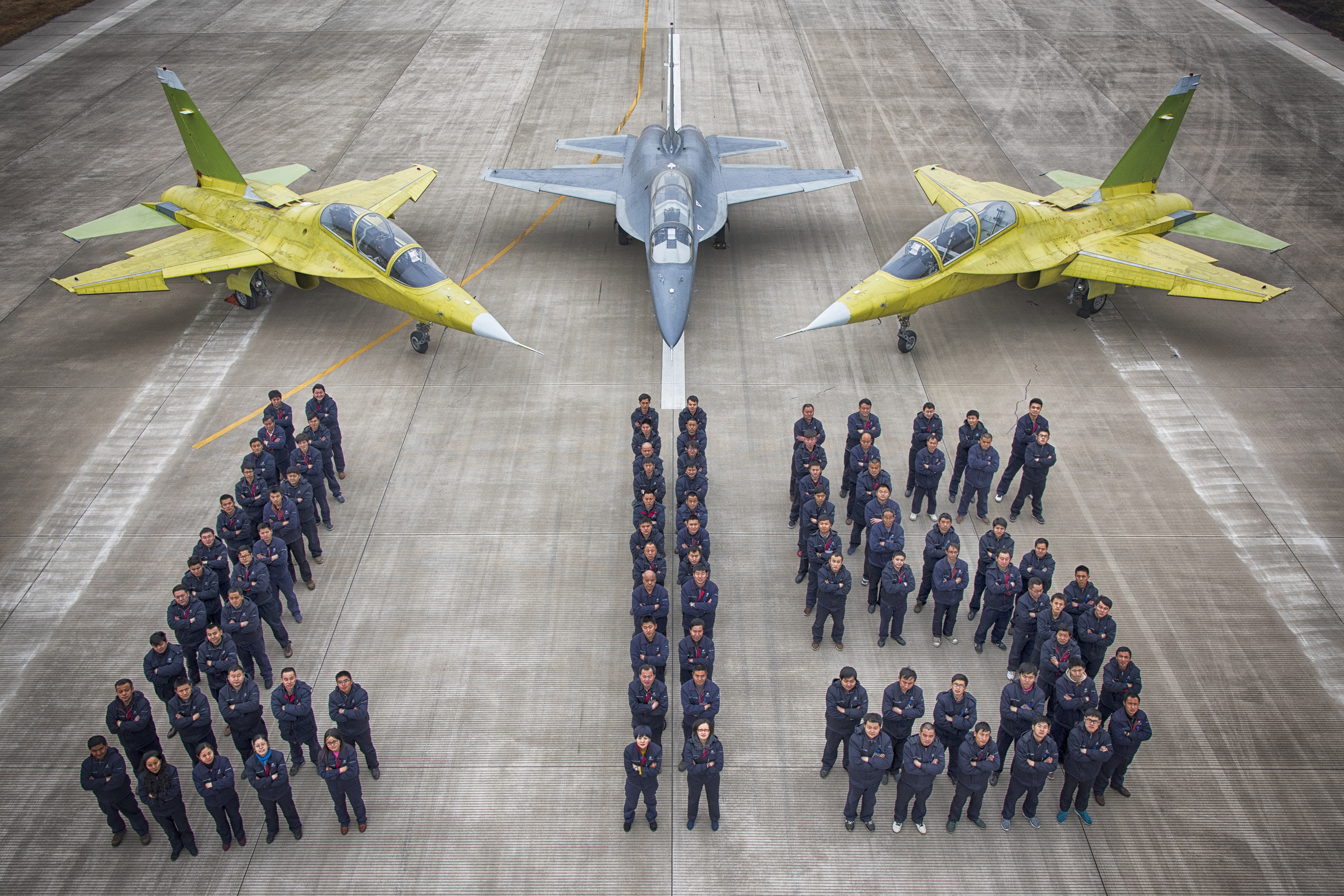
L-15 during a handover ceremony

The Hongdu JL-10, also initially known as Hongdu L-15 Falcon, is a supersonic advanced jet trainer and light combat aircraft developed by Hongdu Aviation Industry Corporation (HAIC). It is used by the People's Liberation Army Air Force (PLAAF) as a lead-in fighter trainer (LIFT).

== Design ==
The L-15 uses fly-by-wire (FBW) and a glass cockpit. The prototypes were powered by Lotarev DV-2 turbofans.

The L-15A subsonic advanced jet trainer is powered by the Ivchenko-Progress AI-222-25 and has seven weapon hardpoints. The supersonic advanced fighter trainer variant is powered by the afterburning AI-222K-25. According to a Ukrainian source, 25% of the aircraft is composed of composite materials and its service life is 10,000 hours.

The L-15B light attack aircraft is powered by the AI-222K-25F for a maximum speed of Mach 1.4. Compared to the L-15A, the L-15B has shorter take-off and landing distances and two more hardpoints. The L-15A and L-15B use a PESA radar. The aircraft can be armed with the air-to-air missiles.

== Development ==
China Aviation Industry Corporation II (AVIC II) was working toward a new advanced trainer for the People's Liberation Army (PLA) by 2000; that year AVIC II contracted the Yakovlev Design Bureau from Russia — and designer of the Yak-130 trainer — as a technical and scientific consultant for the L-15 programme. The L-15 would compete with the Guizhou JL-9 developed in parallel by China Aviation Industry Corporation I. The prototype was completed in September 2005 and first flew on March 13, 2006. The initial variants were a subsonic advanced jet trainer and a supersonic advanced fighter trainer.

Development of the L-15B, a supersonic variant for LIFT, was announced in 2010. It first flew on December 21, 2017.

The China National Aero-Technology Import & Export Corporation (CATIC) ordered 12 L-15 jet trainers in November 2012; it was not known whether these were for — or would be delivered to — a third-party.

Zambia ordered six advanced fighter trainers as the L-15Z in 2014 for US$100 million; they were delivered in 2016 and 2017.

The first L-15 in PLAAF colors was seen in 2016. The PLA used a few L-15s for flight-test evaluation before 2018. The People's Liberation Army Navy received 12 L-15s in August 2018. The PLAAF began using the JL-10 for LIFT in 2019. Compared to the less sophisticated JL-9, the JL-10 reduces candidate and conversion training time for more recent PLAAF aircraft.

On 23 February 2022, the United Arab Emirates announced its intention to buy 12 L-15s, with an option for 36 more. The value of the deal was not released, the Emirati newspaper The National reported that China sells the L-15 for $10–15 million per unit.

== Operational history ==
On September 2, 2026, an aerial encounter happened over the disputed Scarborough Shoal in the South China Sea. Three Chinese military Hongdu JL-10 light combat aircraft intercepted and drove away three propeller driven Philippine aircraft when armed with PL-5 short-range air-to-air missiles. China used the JL-10 light combat aircraft for low-risk interception missions as a cost-effective strategy.

== Variants ==
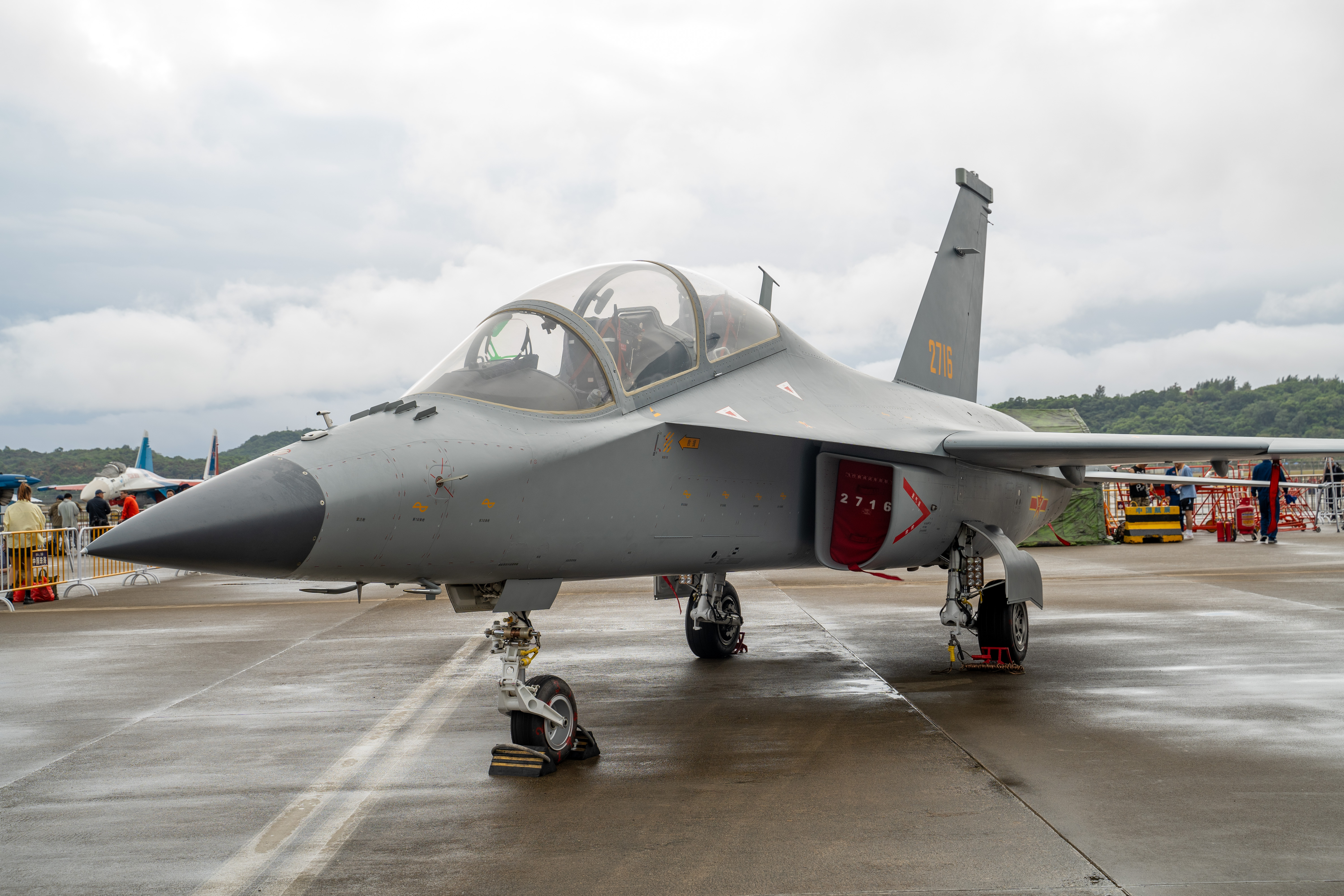
Hongdu JL-10 in Zhuhai airshow 2024

- L-15AW: Subsonic advanced jet trainer version with seven hardpoints. Previously marketed as L-15A.
- L-15 advanced fighter trainer: Supersonic variant of the L-15A.
- L-15Z: Designation of L-15 advanced fighter trainer in Zambian Air Force service.
- L-15B: Supersonic light attack variant with nine hardpoints.
- JL-10: PLAAF designation.
- JL-10J: Carrier-compatible version of the JL-10. Used for catapult launch training and was seen on Type 003 aircraft carrier.
- JL-10 Twin-Tail: Unnamed twin-tail aircraft largely based on the JL-10. The configuration is similar to the Boeing T-7 and the role is likely for carrier-based training. In October 2025, the jet trainer was observed in flight testing.

== Operators ==
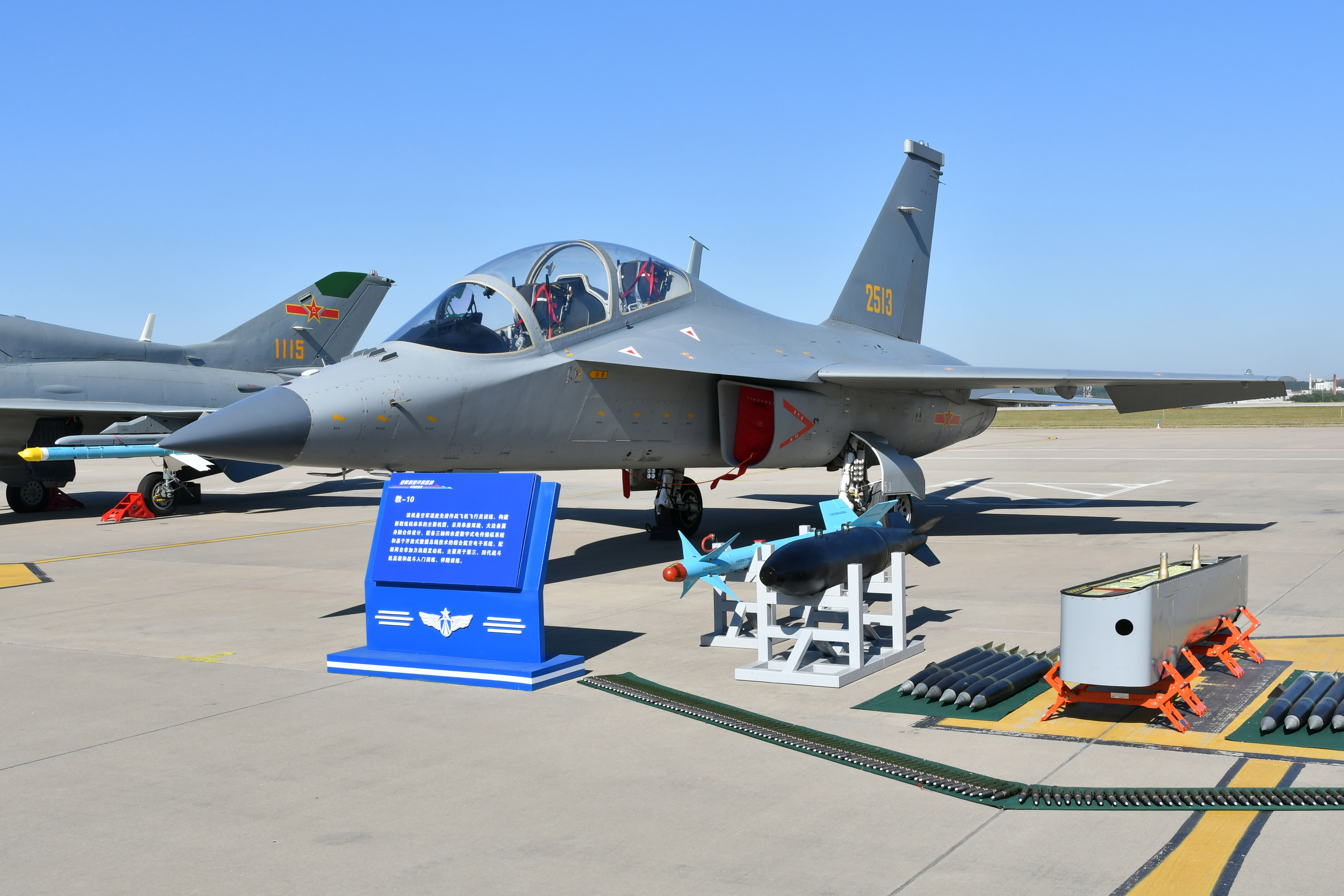
PLAAF JL-10 with armaments including the PL-5 short-range air-to-air missile

China

- People's Liberation Army Air Force: 50+
- People's Liberation Army Naval Air Force: 12

United Arab Emirates

- United Arab Emirates Air Force: 48 (projected)

Zambia

- Zambian Air Force: 6

== Specifications (L-15B) ==
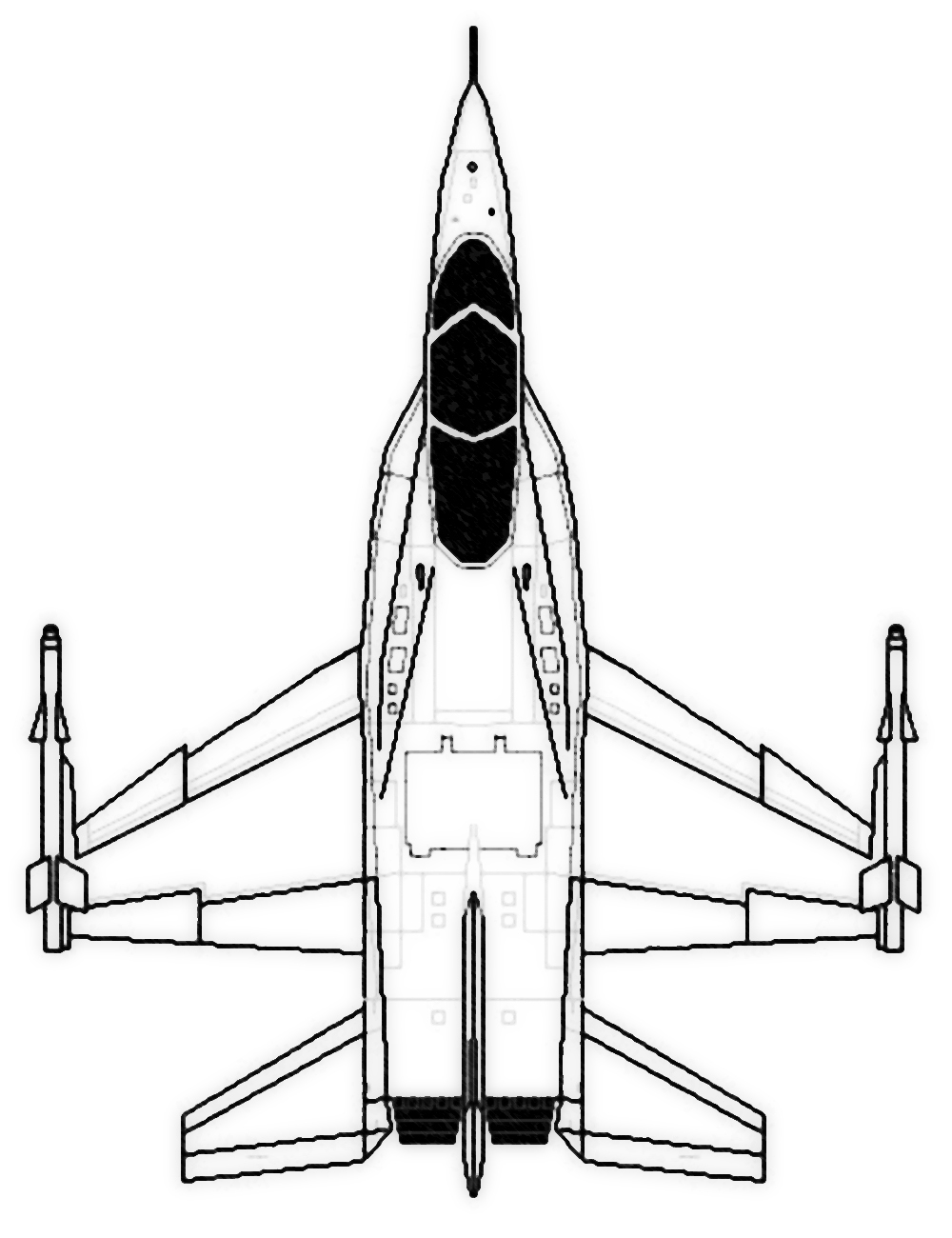
L-15 top view

Data from

General characteristics

- Crew: 2
- Length: 12.4 m (40 ft 8 in)
- Wingspan: 9.4 m (30 ft 10 in)
- Height: 4.7 m (15 ft 5 in)
- Max takeoff weight: 11,600 kg (25,574 lb)
- Powerplant: 2 × Ivchenko-Progress AI-222K-25F afterburning turbofan, 41.19 kN (9,260 lbf) with afterburner

Performance

- Maximum speed: Mach 1.4
- Ferry range: 2,600 km (1,600 mi, 1,400 nmi)

Armament

- Hardpoints: 7 for L-15AW and 9 for L-15B with a capacity of 3500kg
- Rockets: Rockets
- Missiles:
  - SD-10 (PL-12) BVR air-to-air missiles (offered for export with the L-15B)
  - PL-8 short-range air-to-air missiles
  - PL-5 short-range air-to-air missiles
- Bombs: LS-6 family of precision-guided bombs

Avionics

- PESA radar
- Radar warning receiver
- Electronic warfare pod

== See also ==
Aircraft of comparable role, configuration, and era

- AIDC T-5 Brave Eagle
- Alenia Aermacchi M-346 Master
- Boeing T-7 Red Hawk
- Guizhou JL-9
- KAI T-50 Golden Eagle
- TAI Hürjet
- Yakovlev Yak-130
