= HAL HTFE-25 =

Aircraft engine

HTFE-25
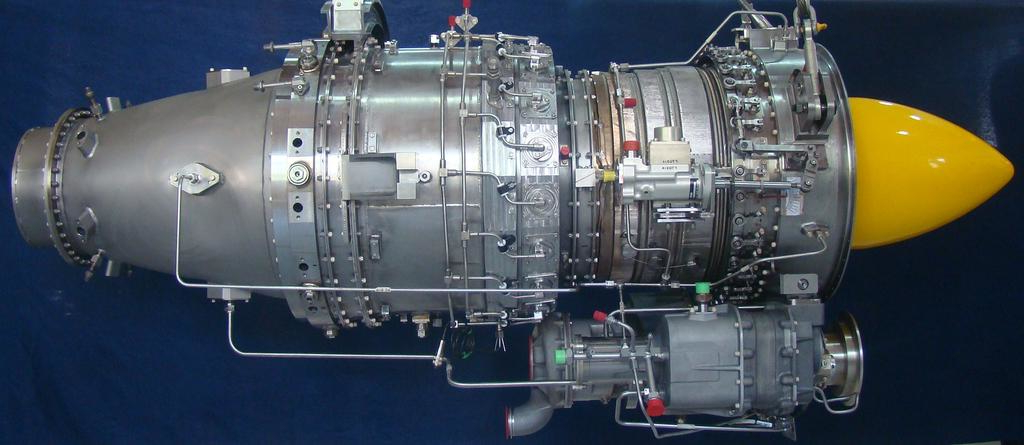
- HTFE-25 turbofan engine from HAL
- Type: Afterburning turbofan
- National origin: India
- Manufacturer: Hindustan Aeronautics Limited
- First run: 14 December 2015
- Status: Under development
- Number built: 2 (Core engines) 1 Technology demonstrator

The HAL HTFE-25 ("Hindustan Turbo Fan Engine") is a 25 kN turbofan engine under development by Hindustan Aeronautics Limited (HAL). The engine can be used in trainer jets, business jets and UAVs in single-engine configuration for weight categories up to 5 tonnes and in twin engine configuration for weight categories up to 9 tonnes. Based on the technical feasibility, the market potential for engine is of 200–250 units.

== Development ==
The project commenced in 2013–14 with a projected timeline of completion within six years.

Two engines have been produced and completed 339 runs as of 2019 out of which 96 runs were conducted in 2018–19. Engine has successfully completed cold starting test at 14 °C with spark igniters and has also achieved 100 per cent max speed with and without IGV modulation.

The company has also initiated the development for integrating afterburner technology on engine. In March 2019, first test with "basic afterburner" configuration was conducted on the engine. Cold weather trials and hot weather high altitude trials were completed at Leh. Full engine (technology demonstrator) has been built and first run completed successfully. Completion of acceleration trials up to 55% of the speed achieved.

As of July 2026, the second core engine has completed acceleration trials with 99.5% of the speed. While further trials are underway, HAL plans to certify the engine within the next 4–5 years.

== Specifications ==
Data from

==== General characteristics ====
- Type: turbofan
- Length: 1,730 millimetres (68 in)
- Diameter: 590 millimetres (23 in)
- Dry weight: 350 kilograms (770 lb)

==== Components ====
- Compressor:

==== Performance ====
- Maximum thrust: 25 kN (2,500 kgf; 5,600 lbf) (dry thrust)
- Bypass ratio: 0.50
- Air mass flow: 43 kg/s
- Turbine inlet temperature: 1450 K
- Fuel consumption: 0.71 kg/kgf-hr (1.565 lb/lbf-hr)
- Thrust-to-weight ratio: 7.27

== See also ==
Related development

- HAL HTSE-1200

Comparable engines

- Honeywell/ITEC F124
- IHI Corporation XF5
- Ivchenko-Progress AI-322
- Rolls-Royce Turbomeca Adour
- TEI-TF6000

Related lists

- List of aircraft engines
