= TEI-TF6000 =

Turbofan engine developed by Tusaş Engine Industries

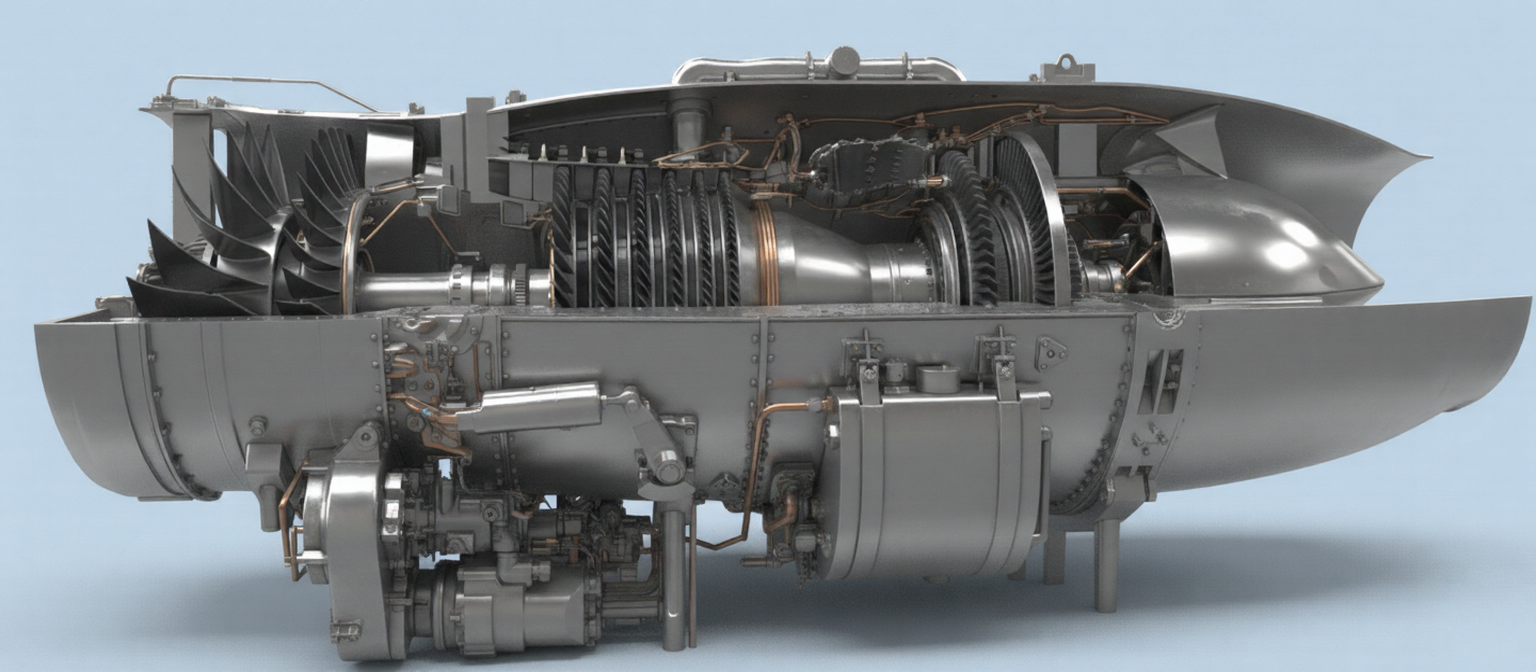
- TEI-TF6000 turbofan engine 3D modelling
- Type: Turbofan
- National origin: Turkey
- Manufacturer: Tusaş Engine Industries (TEI)
- First run: 9 March 2024
- Major applications: Bayraktar Kızılelma; TAI Anka-3
- Number built: 1
- Developed into: TEI-TF10000

The TEI-TF6000 is an indigenously developed turbofan engine by Tusaş Engine Industries (TEI), designed to deliver 6,000 pounds-force (26.7 kN) of thrust. The engine is primarily intended for use in Turkish unmanned aerial vehicles (UAVs), advanced trainer aircraft, and light combat aircraft. The TF6000 forms part of Turkey's broader initiative for self-sufficiency in advanced defense technologies.

== Design and development ==
The TEI-TF6000 project was initiated by TEI to create a domestically produced engine to power both unmanned and light combat platforms. It was stated by TEI that the engine is expected to be ready for testing in 2023. It was announced that the first rotating parts of the engine were produced on 31 August 2023. It first ran on 9 March 2024, marking a significant milestone in Turkey's aerospace engine capabilities. This engine also serves as a technological stepping stone for future projects, including a variant with afterburner capability, known as the TF10000. The engine underwent more than 30 tests in the two weeks following its first start-up. On 4 October 2024, the engine was publicly exhibited at the Teknofest technology festival. CEO Mahmut Faruk Akşit said the following at the fair; "TF6000 is a turbofan military aircraft engine... We have advanced to the US, UK, France, Germany league, the class of countries that have developed their own engines, the Super League. We started the engine in February. We increased it to 15 thousand rpm and kept it there for a long time."

By October 2024, more than 60 tests had been conducted. TEI's CEO Mahmut Faruk Akşit emphasized that the TF-10000 and TF-6000 engines were developed in parallel. "They both use the same core, of course the TF-6000 is without an afterburner. The TF-10,000 is a version with an afterburner," he said. In February 2025, TEI CEO Akşit stated that the engine was almost finished, but since it was developed in parallel with the TF-10000, they were considering completing both together. Aksit also stated that demands had come from abroad before the engine was even finished. TF-6000 is considered a pioneer engine for TAI Kaan's future domestic engine and is being prepared accordingly. The TF6000 is expected to fulfill various roles in Turkey's military, supporting advanced unmanned systems like the Bayraktar Kızılelma and the TAI Anka-3. TEI's development process for the TF6000 included advanced material engineering, fuel efficiency optimization, and modular design. On September 17, 2025, the engine was tested publicly for the first time.

During testing, the TF6000 turbofan reportedly achieved approximately 5,900 lbf (26 kN) of thrust, approaching and in some cases exceeding its nominal 6,000-lbf-class target performance.

TEI General Manager Prof. Dr. Mahmut F. Akşit stated that the engine had reached a power level suitable for unmanned combat aircraft such as the TAI Anka-3 and Baykar Bayraktar Kızılelma.

According to Akşit, the engine displayed during Teknofest demonstrations was operated only at limited power settings for public safety, while full-scale ground tests were conducted at substantially higher thrust levels.

Flight-test engines are expected to be delivered to platform manufacturers following the completion of ongoing maturation testing.

== Specifications ==
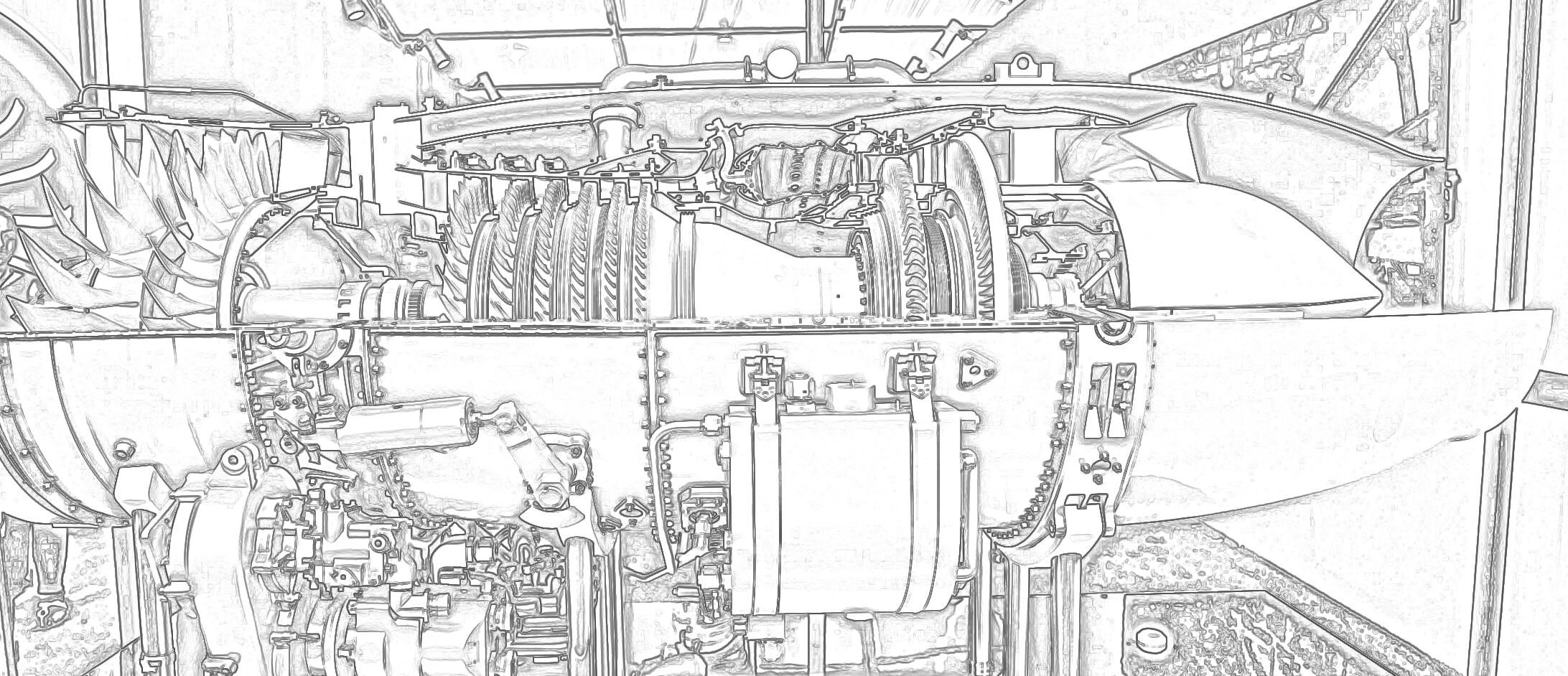
TF6000 Jet Engine sketch

Data from

==== General characteristics ====
- Type: turbofan
- Length: 2,250 millimetres (89 in)
- Diameter: 650 millimetres (26 in)
- Dry weight: 400 kilograms (880 lb)

==== Components ====
- Compressor: 2-stage axial fan; 6-stage axial HP
- Combustors: Annular
- Turbine: 1-stage high-pressure, 1-stage low-pressure
- Fuel type: Jet A-1
- Oil system: Closed-loop

==== Performance ====
- Maximum thrust: 26.7 kN (2,720 kgf; 6,000 lbf) (dry thrust)
- Bypass ratio: 1.08
- Air mass flow: 40 kg/s
- Turbine inlet temperature: 1400 K
- Specific fuel consumption: 0.70 lb/(lbf⋅h) (19.8 g/(kN⋅s))
- Thrust-to-weight ratio: 6.68

== See also ==
Related development

- TEI TS1400
- TEI-TF10000

Comparable engines

- HAL HTFE-25
- Honeywell/ITEC F124
- IHI Corporation XF5
- Ivchenko-Progress AI-322
- Rolls-Royce Turbomeca Adour

Related lists

- List of aircraft engines
