= TAI TF Kaan =

Turkish fighter aircraft

TAI Kaan
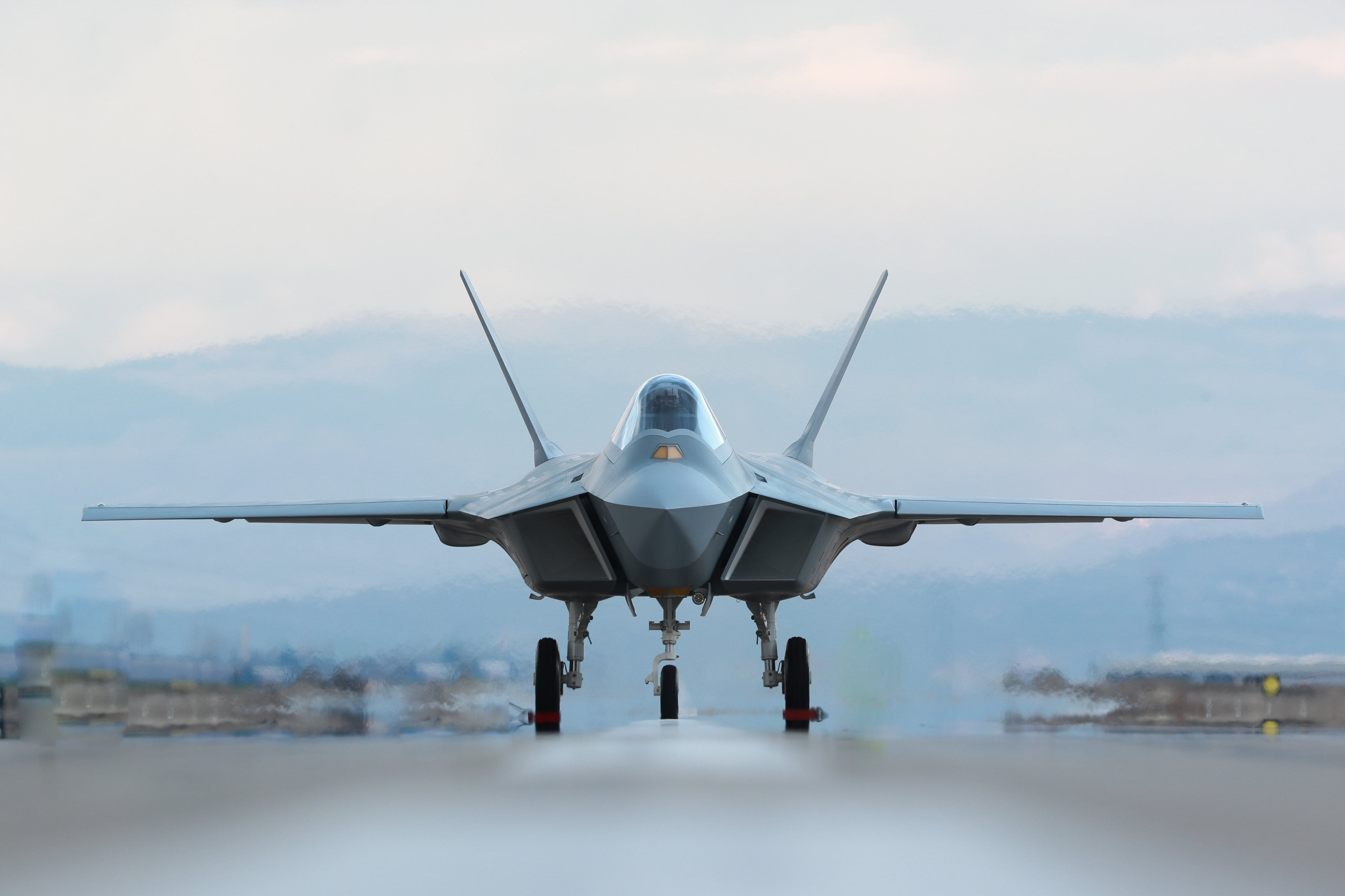
- Kaan during runway tests at its facilities in Ankara on 17 March 2023

General information
- Other name: TF or MMU
- Type: Stealth multirole/air superiority fighter
- National origin: Turkey
- Manufacturer: Turkish Aerospace Industries
- Status: Under development
- Primary user: Turkish Air Force
- Prototypes: 3
- Flights: 2

History
- Introduction date: 2030s (planned)
- First flight: 21 February 2024
- Initiated: 2010

TAI Kaan, internally referred to as the TF (lit. 'Turkish Fighter') and MMU (Turkish: Milli Muharip Uçak, lit. 'National Combat Aircraft'), is a fifth-generation stealth, twin-engine, all-weather air superiority fighter currently under development by Turkish Aerospace Industries (TAI). Designed to replace the Turkish Air Force’s fleet of F-16 Fighting Falcons, the Kaan is also intended for export to international markets.

The prototype performed taxi and ground tests on 16 March 2023 and was ceremonially rolled out two days later. Its maiden flight, initially scheduled for 27 December 2023, one day before the maiden flight of the TAI Anka-3, was completed on 21 February 2024.

== Development ==
On 15 December 2010, Turkey's Defence Industry Executive Committee (SSIK) approved the design, development, and manufacture of a national next-generation air superiority fighter to replace Turkey's F-16 fleet and operate alongside other key assets such as the F-35 Lightning II.

In 2011, Turkey's Undersecretariat for Defence Industries (SSM), now known as the Defence Industry Agency, signed an agreement with Turkish Aerospace Industries (TAI) for the conceptual development of the aircraft's basic capabilities. TAI and TUSAŞ Engine Industries (TEI) were assigned to lead the design, development, and entry processes of the fighter. The studies aimed to determine the fighter’s cost, evaluate potential mechanical and electronic systems, and assess the opportunities and challenges within military aviation.

Funding of approximately US$20 million was allocated for a two-year conceptual design phase, conducted by TAI. TAI officials projected completion of this phase by late 2013, after which a report would be submitted to the Prime Minister to approve the budget and framework for the development phase. Janes described the project as "extremely ambitious."

In 2024, it was announced that TÜBİTAK and Aselsan would support TAI in the development and construction of the aircraft.

=== Bid ===
In March 2015, the Turkish Undersecretariat for Defence Industries (SSM) issued a Request for Information to Turkish companies which had the capability "to perform a genuine design, development and production activities of the first Turkish fighter aircraft to meet Turkish Armed Forces' next generation fighter requirements" signalling the official start of the program. The contract for design and development of the fighter was signed between the SSM of Ministry of Turkish National Defence and Turkish Aerospace Industries Inc. in August 2016. The SSM granted $1.18 bn. to Turkish Aerospace Industries to acquire necessary technologies and infrastructure for the design, testing and certification of the aircraft.

In the same period, Request for Proposal was published for the engine of the aircraft, and General Electric, Eurojet and Snecma companies returned to this file. Within the scope of the RFP, the condition was for the engine infrastructure to be developed in Turkey and production be domestic as long as possible.

=== Development schedule ===
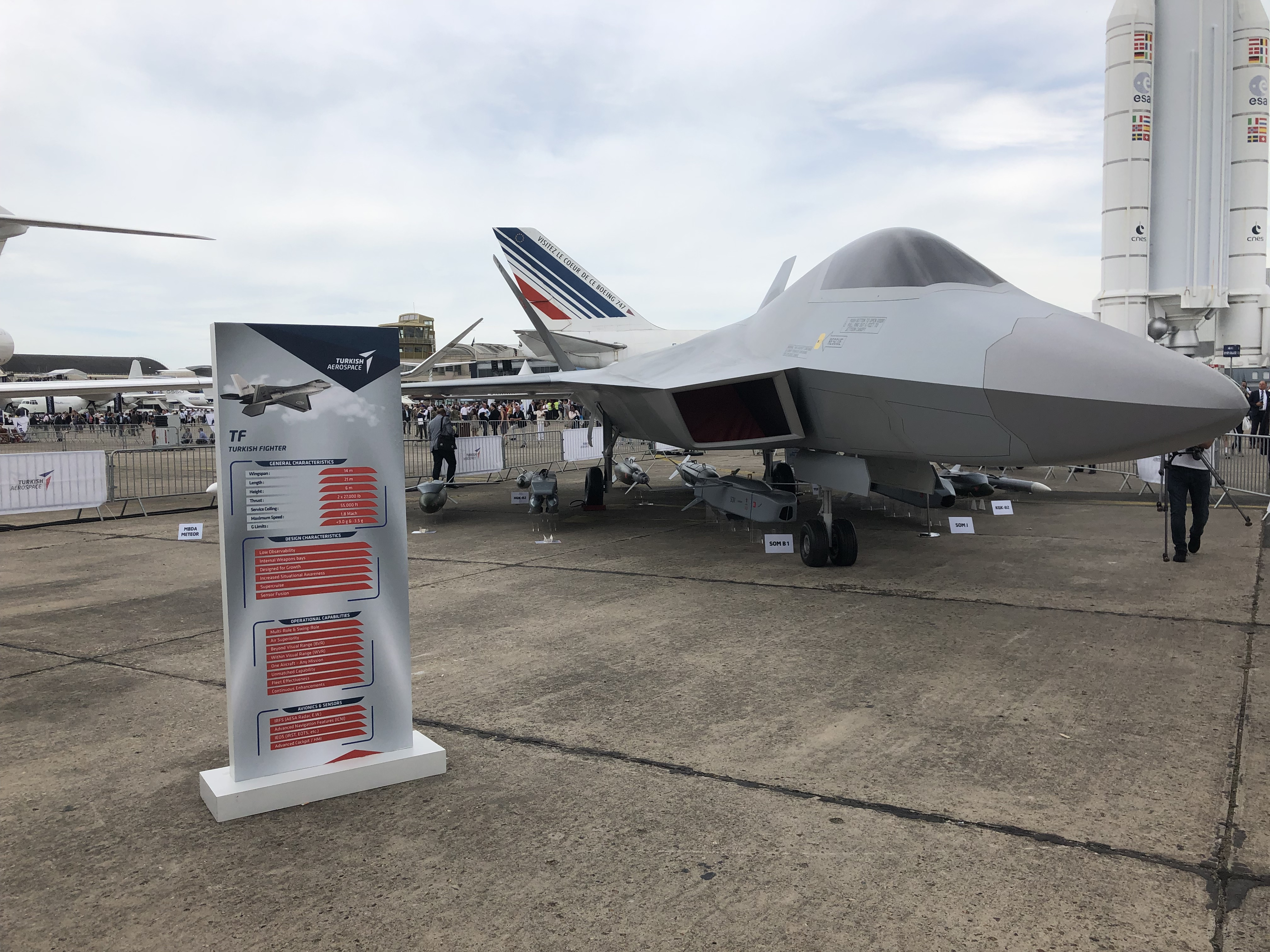
A TF-X mock-up at the 2019 Paris Air Show

Development Phase-1 was expected to officially commence by the end of 2014, however, initial conditions were met and the project was officially started in late 2018.

In June 2021, the Turkish Air Force made a presentation about the TF-X program to the press. It was stated that Phase-1 Stage-1 had started with preliminary design works, right after T0 stage. As part of preliminary design activities, a system requirements review (SRR) is currently being carried out. By the end of 2022, system functionality review (SFR) and system requirements review (SRR) will be completed. Thus, the preliminary design activities will come to an end. The program is expected to go to the next stage by 2023 when the initial roll-out occurs with engines capable of taxiing.

Phase-1 Stage-2 involves detailed design and qualifications carried out in the 2022-2029 period. The aircraft will roll out in 2023, critical design review (CDR) activities will be carried out in 2024, the production of the first aircraft, called Block-0, will be completed in 2025 and the first flight will be accomplished in 2026. Until that date, TAI aims to manufacture 3 prototypes. The Block-1 configuration is planned to be developed until 2029. The manufacture of 10 Block-1 fighter jets is planned within the scope of Phase-2, and the aircraft will be delivered to the Turkish Air Force between 2030 and 2033. In Phase-3, between 2034 and 2040, development and mass production activities of other TF-X blocks is planned.

=== Partnerships ===
==== Saab AB ====
In February 2013, meetings were held with Saab AB upon the instruction of then-Prime Minister Recep Tayyip Erdoğan. An agreement was signed between TAI and the Swedish firm Saab during the state visit of then-Turkish President Abdullah Gül to Sweden in March 2013, according to which:

- Saab AB would provide technological design assistance for Turkey's TF-X program.
- TAI would have the option to purchase Saab's fighter aircraft design unit.

This plan was later abandoned. In January 2015, then-Prime Minister Ahmet Davutoğlu announced that the TF-X program will be a completely independent domestic platform, not in partnership with Korea, Sweden, Brazil or Indonesia.

==== BAE Systems ====
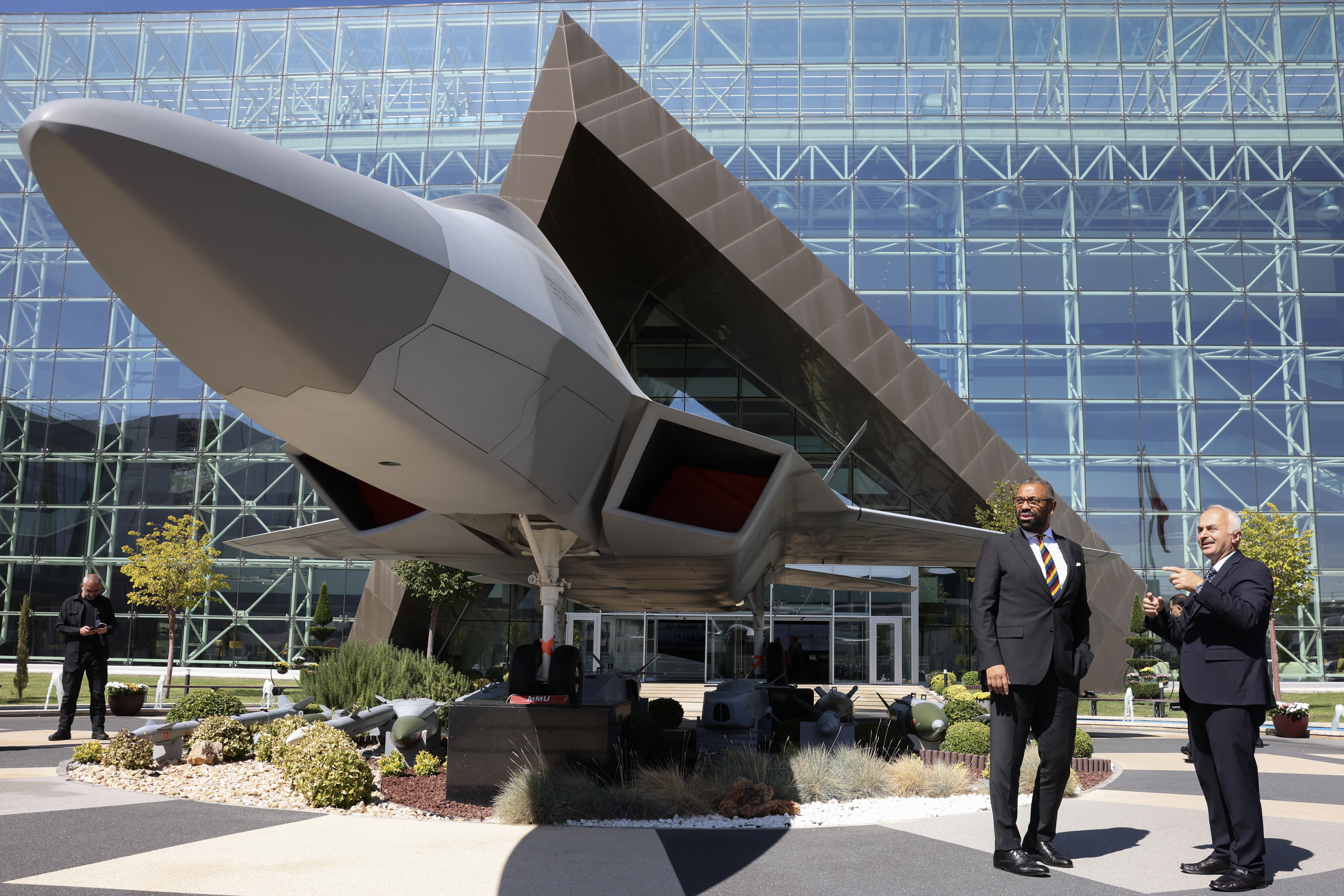
UK Foreign Secretary James Cleverly examines the TFX-Kaan mock-up during his visit to the Turkish Aerospace Industries headquarters in Turkey (2023)

In December 2015, Turkey's Undersecretariat for Defence Industries (SSM) announced that it had chosen BAE Systems of the United Kingdom to assist with the design of the nation's next-generation air superiority fighter. On the same day, Rolls-Royce offered technology transfer for the EJ200 engine and joint-development of a derivative for the TF-X program. During the visit of British Prime Minister Theresa May to Turkey in January 2017, BAE Systems and TAI officials signed an agreement, worth about £100 million, for BAE Systems to provide engineering assistance in developing the aircraft. Following the agreement, the UK issued an open general export licence to defence companies willing to export goods, software or technology to Turkey.

=== Engine ===
On 20 January 2015, ASELSAN of Turkey signed a memorandum of understanding with Eurojet, the manufacturer of the EJ200 engine used in the Eurofighter Typhoon. A derivative of the EJ200 will be used in the TF-X program. The two companies will additionally collaborate and co-develop engine control software systems and engine maintenance monitoring systems.

Turkey's selection of the EJ200 evidenced TAI's intention to use supercruise capability. In May 2017, Rolls-Royce established a joint venture with the Kale Group of Turkey to develop and manufacture engines for the project. Another competitor is TRMotor Power Systems Inc. established in April 2017 by BMC, TAI and SSTEK. In November 2018, TRMotor signed a memorandum of understanding with the Presidency of Defence Industries to develop a jet engine for the TF-X project.

While General Electric did not openly express interest in the TF-X project, its local partner Tusaş Engine Industries (TEI) announced that it will participate in the engine development phase. In June 2018, TEI General Manager Mahmut Faruk Akşit said that they proposed a mature engine for which they had completed a commercial proposal for the infrastructure of sub-component tests for the compressor. He emphasized the advantage of GE engines over its competitors stating that they have significant OEM support whereas the collaboration between other companies were yet to thrive. TEI committed to submit all intellectual rights to the government. In October 2018, local media reported that an unknown number of initial production fighters will be equipped with General Electric F110 engines until Turkish Air Engine Company (TAEC) finalizes the local engine.

On 14 March 2022, Kale & Rolls-Royce re-started the progress of developing an engine for the TF-X program, stating that the previous disputes between the companies have been resolved and that the first prototypes of the TF-X will use the F110 engine.

On 5 March 2022, İsmail Demir, undersecretary for Defence Industries, said the government would now negotiate a possible engine deal with Rolls-Royce. “We had some issues [with Rolls-Royce] before. These have been resolved. I think we are ready to work together.”

In May 2022, while visiting the UK, Demir said, "It is imperative for us that the engine be produced in Turkey… that Turkey should possess intellectual property rights." His statement implied that the same dispute over intellectual properties of the engine which previously stalled the negotiation between Rolls-Royce and Turkey in 2019 remained unresolved.

As of 2 June 2022, an unknown number of General Electric F110 engines were delivered to TEI as the first batch, according to the agreement between Tusaş Engine Industries (TEI) and GE Aerospace, that comprises a total delivery of 10 engines.

In July 2022, the Defence Industry Agency published the invitation to tender for the domestic development of the engine to be used. İsmail Demir, undersecretary for Defence Industry Agency, stated that TRMotor, which is a subsidiary of TAI, has submitted its proposal and Turkish Air Engine Company (TAEC), consortium by Kale Group and Rolls-Royce, will submit its offer soon.

In January 2025, President of Defence Industry Agency Haluk Görgün said that after 2030, Kaan will fly with a completely domestic engine. The TF35000 project was announced by the Tusaş Engine Industries in May 2025.

In June 2026, the U.S. government moved to approve the export of General Electric F110 engines for KAAN Block 10. Reuters reported that the proposed deal was valued at US$705 million. The U.S. government formally notified United States Congress.

=== Production ===
On 4 November 2021, the first piece of the MMU was manufactured. Temel Kotil, CEO of TAI said;

We have realized the production of the first part of our National Combat Aircraft. Every step we take for the survival project of our country is very meaningful and valuable for us. I would like to thank all my friends with whom we walked on the same path by working with enthusiasm and effort.

The other 20,000 parts of TF-X were planned to be ready by the end of 2022.

In February 2022, TAI's Deputy General Manager responsible for the TFX, Dr. Uğur Zengin, stated that 550 TF-X parts were in production. The maiden flight was planned for 2025, but has been rescheduled for the end of 2023.

The aircraft was officially named Kaan on 1 May 2023.

In May 2023, TAI CEO Temel Kotil said the company expects to deliver twenty Block 10 aircraft to the Turkish Air Force in 2028, then two aircraft per month by 2029, generating $2.4 billion in annual revenues for TAI.

Kotil also warned that the price tag of the aircraft may surpass his 2021 promise of $100 million per unit. This led the company to seek additional capital and production workers. In July 2023, at the 16th International Defense Industry Fair, a protocol agreement was signed to bring Azerbaijan into the project. Project officials began looking for Azerbaijani companies and production facilities that could be used and 200 Azerbaijani workers were to be immediately dispatched to join the project.

=== Prototypes ===
==== P0 ====
On 21 February 2024, Kaan's first prototype, the P0, conducted its maiden flight. TAI shared a video showing a Kaan jet taking off and then returning to Mürted Airfield Command in the north Ankara. During this flight, Kaan remained in the air for 13 minutes and reached a speed of 230 knots (426 km/h) at an altitude of 8,000 feet (2,438 m). Kaan successfully completed its second flight on 6 May 2024, reaching 10,000 feet (3,048 m) and stayed in the air for 14 minutes. Kaan successfully conducted a twin-engine afterburner test on the ground on 6 December 2024. It was announced by TAI that the second prototype of Kaan is under construction and will fly in the last quarter of 2025. The first image of the second prototype of Kaan was presented to the press by the President of the Defence Industry Agency on 14 January 2025. It was stated in the same statement that 6 prototypes of Kaan would be built for testing and development studies. TAI General Manager Demiroğlu stated that the first flight of Kaan's second prototype has been postponed to April or May 2026. Photos of the fuselage section of Kaan's second prototype, the P1, were released to the press on 26 September 2025. It was announced that Kaan's third prototype, the P2, is also under construction and is scheduled to fly a few months after the second, in July or August. It was stated that the second (P1) and third (P2) prototypes were much more advanced than the first prototype (P0) and would include many important flight and avionics parts that were not present in the first prototype. It was also reported that an unnamed prototype is under construction solely for ground testing. TAI announced on 13 February 2026 that Kaan prototypes were under construction and unveiled three prototypes to the press. Analysts have identified some modifications in prototypes P1 and P2 that differ from those in prototype P0.

==== P1 ====
The P1, the second prototype of the Kaan fighter jet, conducted its first ground tests on July 31, 2026. It was announced that the aircraft, along with the third prototype P2, would make its first flight in 2026. Unlike the first prototype P0, which was produced only for basic flight tests, P1 and P2 were developed for standard fighter jet testing.

== Design ==
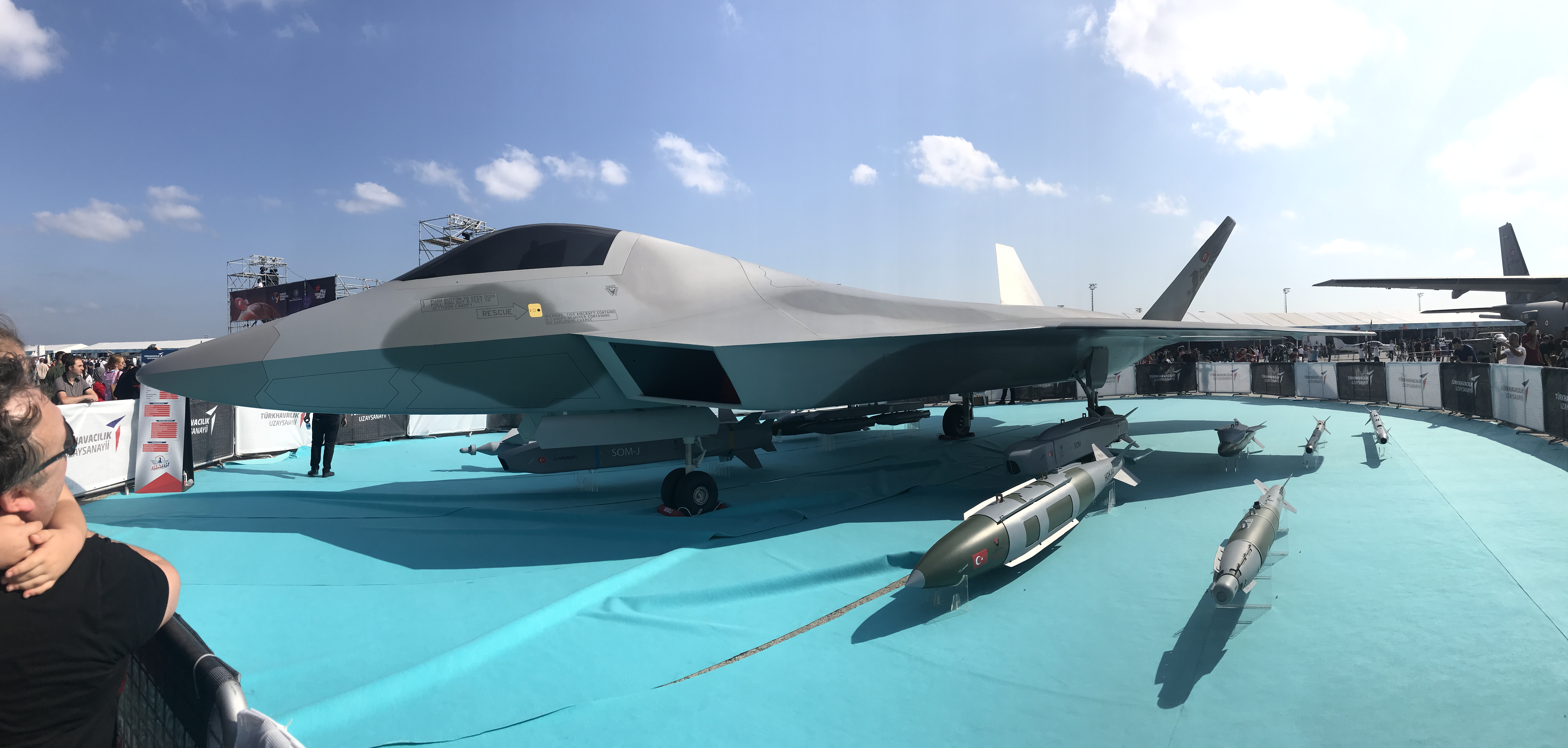
TAI TF-X (MMU) mock-up

=== Airframe ===
In 2015, the TAI released three potential airframe configurations:

- FX-1: Twin engine, Lockheed Martin F-22 like configuration
- FX-5: Single engine, General Dynamics F-16 like configuration
- FX-6: High agility single engine canard-delta Saab JAS 39 Gripen like configuration

Turkish Prime Minister Ahmet Davutoğlu announced in January 2015, that the TF-X will be a twin-engined fighter. The Undersecretariat for Defence Industries published its 2016 Performance Report in March 2017, with a final decision to continue with the twin engine FX-1 configuration.

Hüseyin Yağcı, TAI's chief engineer on the TF-X program, has stated that all three conceptual designs thus far feature a design optimized for low radar cross-sectional density, internal weapons bays, and the ability to supercruise, features associated with fifth-generation fighter jets.

TAI's Advanced Carbon Composites fuselage facility, which was commissioned to produce fuselages for Lockheed Martin's Joint Strike Fighter (F-35) program, has been tasked with developing an Advanced Carbon Composite fuselage for the TF-X. The Turkish Defence Industry Agency has also issued a tender for the development of a new lighter carbon composite thermoplastic for the TF-X fuselage.

=== Requirements ===
In June 2021, the Turkish Air Force, in a presentation made to the press, announced its requirements for minimum capabilities of the TF-X:

- Improved aerodynamics and propulsion
- Supercruise
- Sufficient and optimized combat radius
- Advanced and internal multi-spectral sensors (EW and RF/IR)
- Low observability
- Sensor fusion node and autonomy
- Improved data-link capabilities for network-enabled and network-centric warfare
- High precision stand-off weapons

=== Systems and capabilities ===
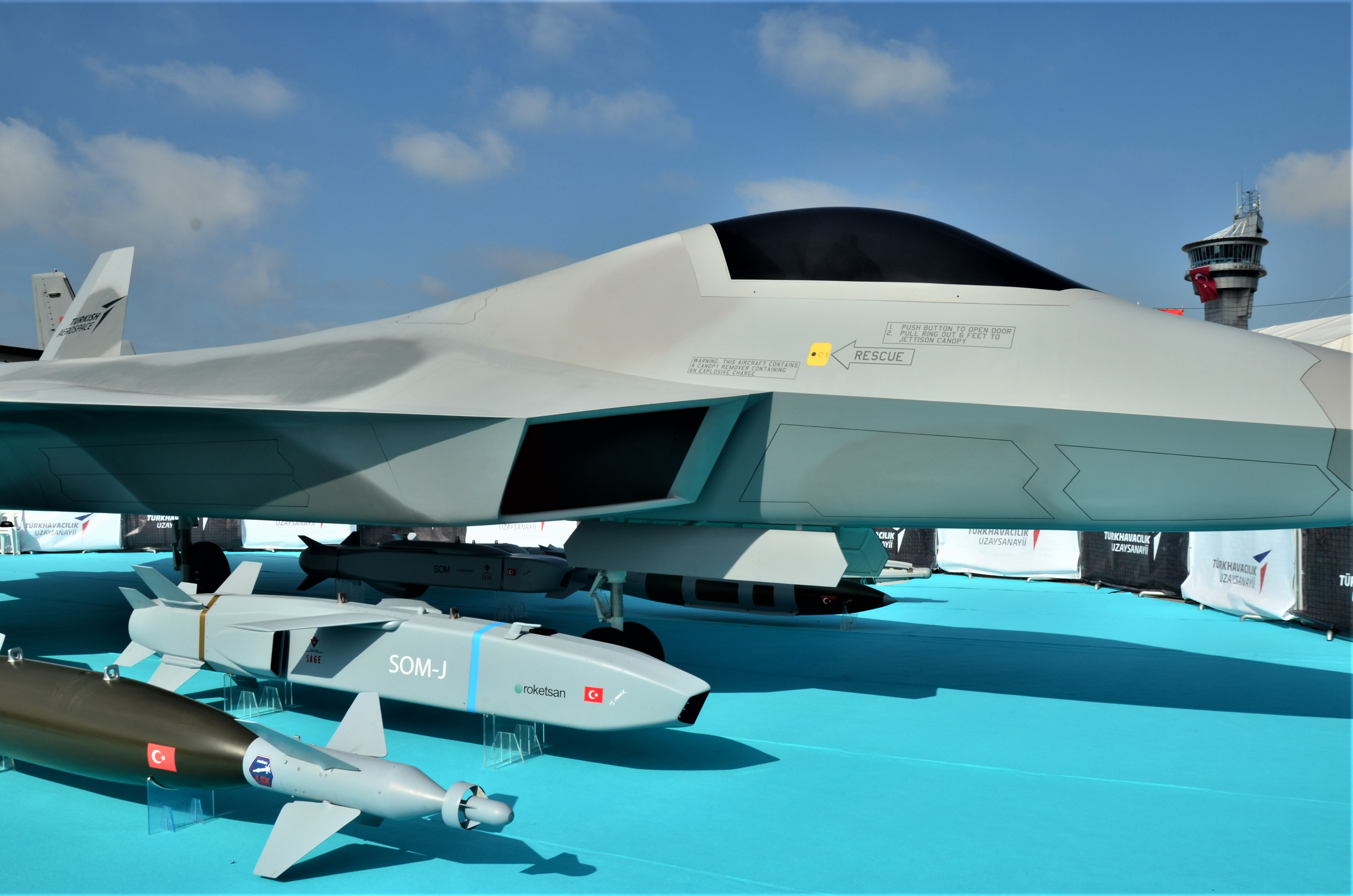
The SOM-J cruise missile developed by TÜBİTAK SAGE and Roketsan is designed to fit the internal weapons bay of the TAI TF-X and F-35.

Integrated Electro-Optical System (IEOS)

- The system includes an Infrared Search and Track (IRST) and an Electro-Optical Targeting System (EOTS).

Integrated Processing Unit (IPU)

- The unit includes components for central management, flight control, aircraft management, and mission computing. It uses deterministic networking technologies, optical communication channels, a multi-core real-time operating system, and cybersecurity measures.

Self-Protection Suite

- The suite consists of a Radar Warning Receiver (RWR), an IR-Missile Warning System (MWS), a Laser Warning Receiver (LWS), Directed Infrared Countermeasures, systems for managing countermeasures such as chaff and flares, a RF decoy dispensing system (CMDS), and a jamming system based Digital Radio-Frequency Memory (DRFM).

Autonomous Wingman Operations

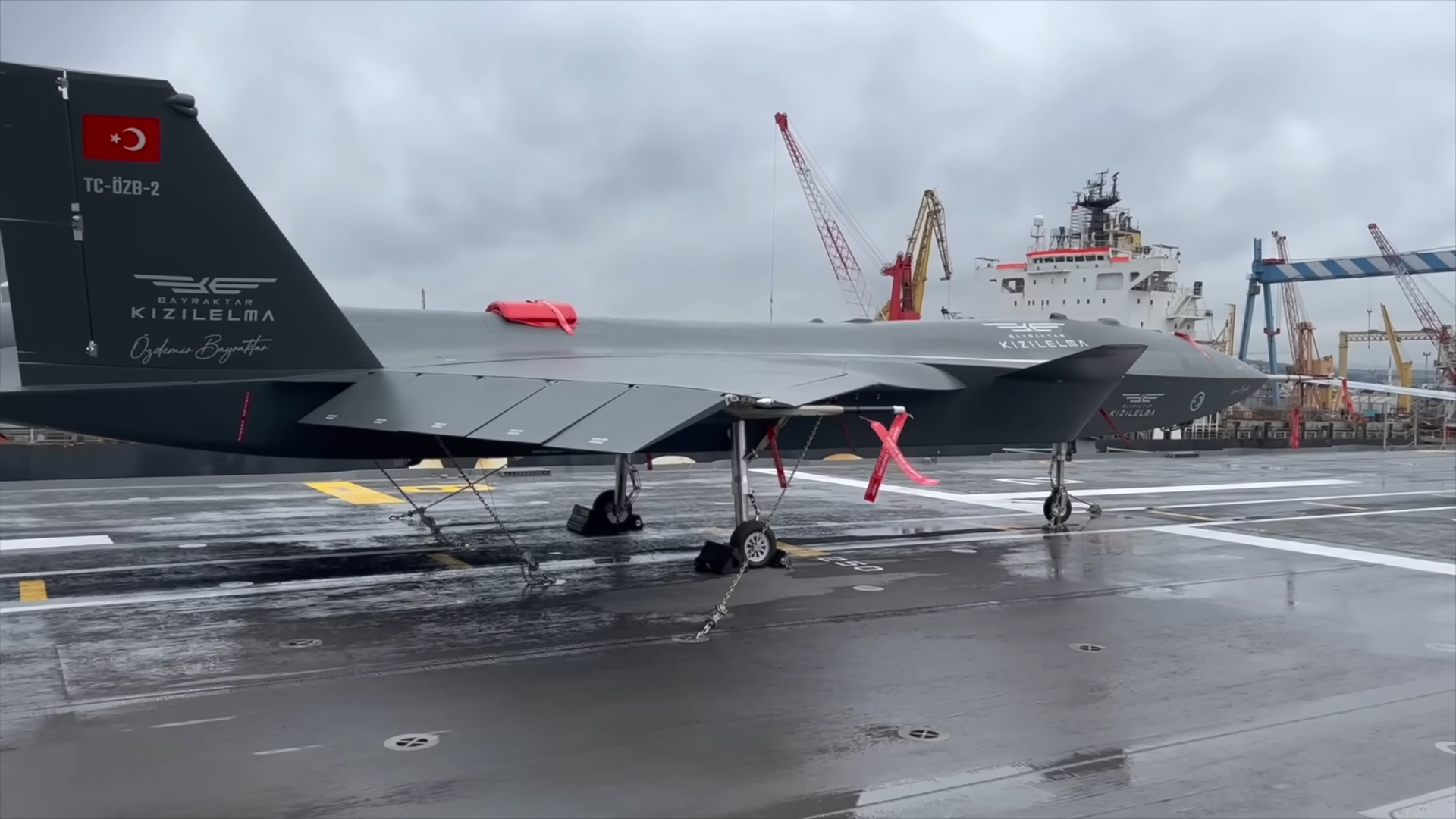
Kızılelma, loyal wingman of KAAN

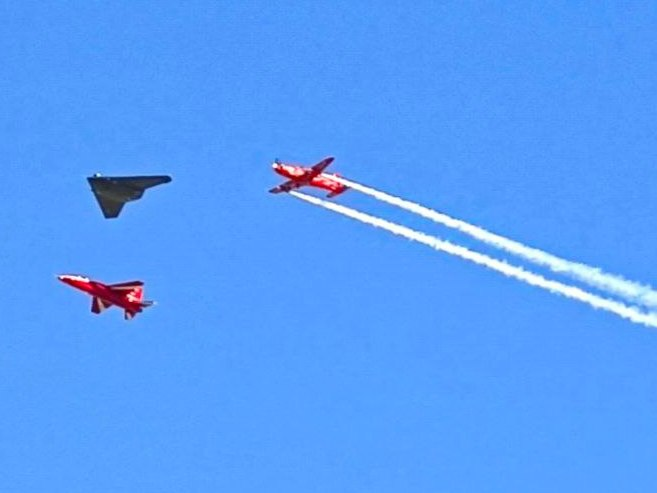
TAI Anka-3 (center) flying in formation with a TAI Hürjet (left) and a TAI Hürkuş (right) in 2024

- The Autonomous Wingman Operations (OKU) framework enables Kaan to control accompanying platforms, such as ANKA-III and Süper Şimşek using encrypted data links. The aircraft’s computational systems provide capabilities for autonomous mission execution, task assignment to UAVs, and coordination with other platforms in air, land, and naval domains, as well as air defense systems. The system allows for intelligence, surveillance, target acquisition, and reconnaissance (ISR), targeting, and air superiority tasks through collaborating aircraft and reduces the workload of onboard pilots. Bayraktar Kızılelma is one of the two Turkish jet-powered stealth UCAVs, along with the TAI Anka-3.

=== Propulsion ===
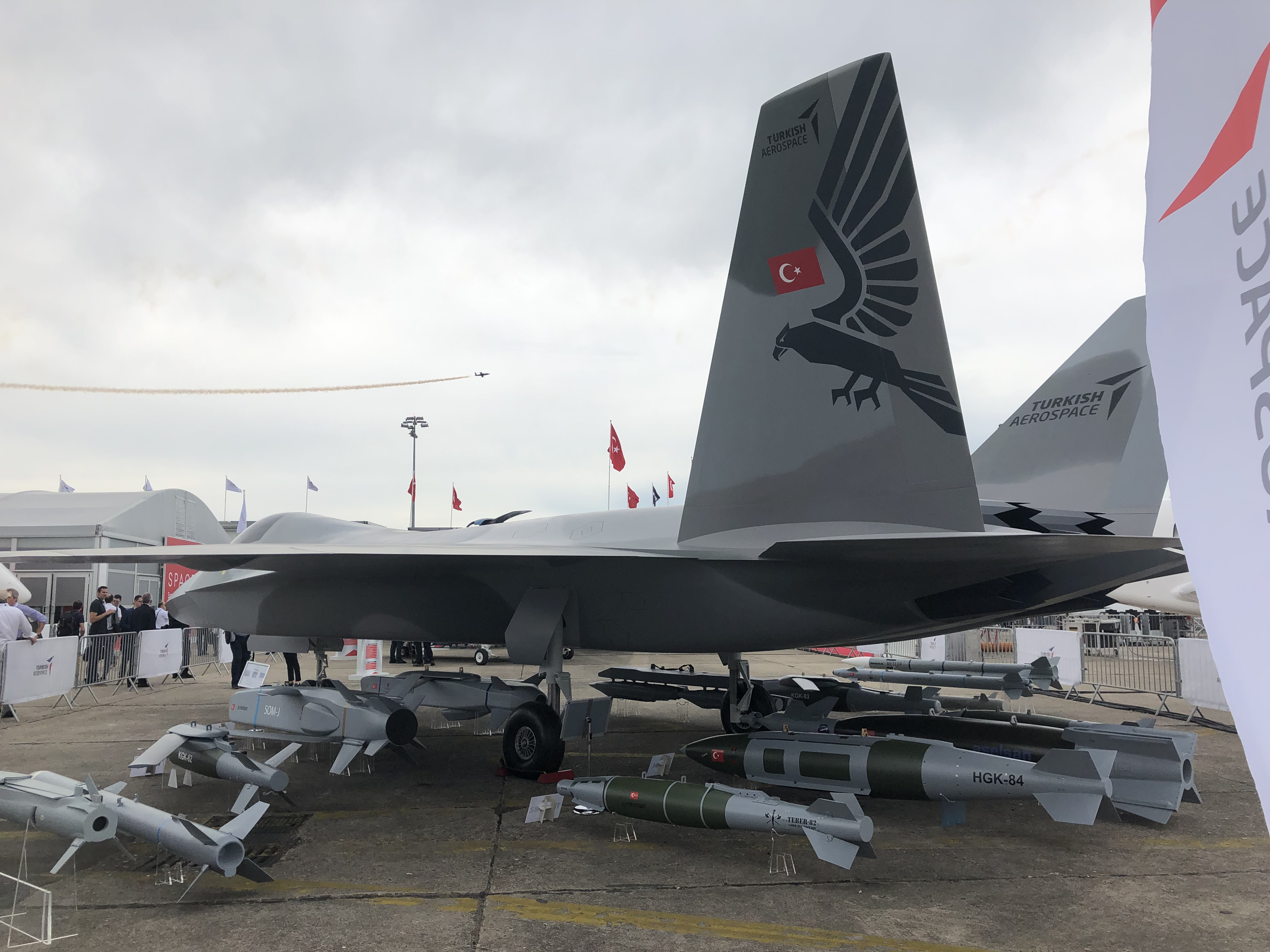
A TAI TF-X (MMU) mock-up, rear view

Prototypes and the first batch of aircraft will be equipped with General Electric F110 engines. TRMotor collaboration with TEI will develop locally made engines for the aircraft, which will produce at least 36,000 pound of thrust. Locally developed engines are planned to be integrated and tested on the aircraft in 2029–2030. In May 2025, TEI (TUSAŞ Engine Industries), the Turkish state-backed aerospace engine manufacturer, published the first official image and technical data of the TEI-TF35000

== Potential sales ==
=== Azerbaijan ===
Azerbaijan signed a protocol to determine the working procedures and principles of cooperation on production data, including the development work of the Kaan.

=== Egypt ===
Egypt expressed interest in Kaan program in September 2024. In July 2025, Turkey announced Egypt's participation in the Kaan program, including co-production of the aircraft. This agreement reflects a strategic shift and a focus on practical industrial collaboration between the two nations.

=== Indonesia ===
In June 2025, Minister of Defense of the Republic of Indonesia and the Turkish Defence Industry Agency (Savunma Sanayii Başkanlığı) signed a Memorandum of Understanding (MoU) for 48 Kaan at the Indo Defence Expo & Forum 2024 in Jakarta. The total order is planned to be delivered with Turkish-produced engines in approximately 10 years after the effective signatures. According to reports from Turkish media, the contract is valued at US$10 billion.

On 24 July 2025, Turkish Aerospace signed agreements with Indonesian Aerospace and PT Republik Aero Dirgantara (PT RAD), as the main local partners, regarding the procurement of 48 Kaan, along with cooperation in production engineering and technology transfers. Indonesian Aerospace would be responsible for final assembly of some of the airframes and technology transfers with Turkish Aerospace Industries, while PT RAD responsibilities are building the main MRO facility, strengthening sustainable local industrial support, and operating the simulator and training center. Indonesia signed a purchase contract for 48 Kaan on 26 July. However, according to some sources this is not a final sale contract as Indonesia has signed similar preliminary contracts with South Korea, France and the United States.

=== Pakistan ===
Pakistan is considered a tier-1 partner in the Kaan fighter project. On 2 August 2023, in Karachi, the Turkish Deputy Defence Minister at the time, Celal Sami Tüfekçi said that there were discussions in regards to Pakistan joining TAI TF Kaan project, with nearly 200 Pakistani technicians and engineers already embedded into the program. Turkey and Pakistan are also reportedly set to establish and operate a joint factory to produce the Kaan fighter jet. According to several Turkish and Pakistani news outlets, representatives from 32 institutions gathered at the 8th meeting of the Pak-Turkish Industrial Expo in Pakistan in April 2025, finalising plans for a partnership between Ankara and Islamabad for the joint-production of Turkey's Kaan fighter jet. (Note: Multiple sources: Kita, Kita (19 April 2025). "Turkiye, Pakistan to establish joint factory for production of KAAN fighter jet". Middle East Monitor.; Vandenbosch. "Türkiye and Pakistan Establish Joint Factory for Production of KAAN Fighter Jet". armyrecognition.com.; "Army Recognition: Pakistan to build KAAN fighter jets". Militarnyi.; "Pakistan close to agreement with Turkey to produce KAAN fighter - Air Data News". www.airdatanews.com. 23 January 2025.; Khan, Bilal (19 March 2025). "Turkish Aerospace Pakistan Test Flies IQBAL Scaled Technology Demonstrator - Quwa".; Sohaib, Rija (9 January 2025). "Turkey and Pakistan to Collaborate on KAAN Jet and Helicopter". ProPakistani.; Aviacionline (14 August 2023). "Pakistan is about to become a partner in Turkey's fifth-generation fighter KAAN program". Aviacionline.)

=== Saudi Arabia ===
It has been claimed that Saudi Arabia is considering purchasing 100 Kaan fighter jets in line with its goals of modernizing its military capacity.

In World Defense Show 2026, TAI displayed a model of the KAAN stealth fighter with the Saudi Arabian flag on its tail.

=== Spain ===
It was reported as of 8 October 2025 that Madrid is willing to acquire the Kaan as an alternative to the F-35.

=== United Arab Emirates ===
TUSAŞ General Manager Mehmet Demiroğlu announced that the United Arab Emirates is also interested in Kaan.

=== Ukraine ===
Ukraine's ambassador to Ankara, Vasyl Bodnar, has openly declared his country's interest in Kaan. The Ukrainian defence industry has shown interest in KAAN's final engine.

== Operators ==
=== Future operators ===
Turkey

- Turkish Air Force: According to TAI executives, the company will supply limited-capacity 20 Kaan Block 10 by 2028. The remaining aircraft will be improved variants.

== Preliminary specifications ==
Data from Turkish Aerospace Industries

General characteristics

- Crew: One
- Length: 20.3 m (66 ft 7 in)
- Wingspan: 13.4 m (44 ft 0 in)
- Height: 5 m (16 ft 5 in)
- Wing area: 71.6 m^{2} (770 sq ft)
- Max takeoff weight: 34,750 kg (76,500 lb)
- Powerplant: 2 × General Electric F110-GE-129 (Note: TAI Kaan will use the TF-35000 engine, which will be produced by TEI.) Turbofan, 76.3 kN (17.155 lbf) thrust each dry, 131 kN (29,000 lbf) with afterburner

Performance

- Maximum speed: Mach 1,8
- Service ceiling: 16,764 m (55,000 ft)
- g limits: +9,0 g & −3,5 g
- Wing loading: 485 kg/m^{2} (99 lb/sq ft)
- Thrust/weight: 0,75

Armament

- Guns: 30x113 mm
- Hardpoints: 8 internal; 3 per wing, total 6 external
- Missiles:
  - Air-to-air missiles:
    - GÖKTUĞ missile program:
      - Gökdoğan BVR active radar homing
      - Gökhan ramjet engine powered BVR active radar homing
      - Bozdoğan short-range infrared homing
  - Air-to-surface missiles:
    - SOM Cruise Missile (B1, B2, and J variants)
    - KUZGUN-TJ, Turbojet-powered Air-to-surface missile
    - KUZGUN-KY, Solid fuel Rocket-powered Air-to-surface missile
    - KUZGUN-ER, Turbojet-powered, Air-to-surface missile (According to TUBITAK-SAGE, this missile will be equivalent to Penguin Missiles.)
    - KUZGUN-EW, KUZGUN-EW will be able to carry miniaturised EW payload which will act as a stand-in jammer and suppress enemy air defences to significantly increase the survivability of the aircraft of the Turkish Air Force.
    - AKBABA, Air-to-surface, Anti-radiation Missile (ARM)
    - ROKETSAN ÇAKIR Missile Family, Anti-ship, Air-to-surface, surface-to-surface Cruise Missile.
- Bombs:
  - Teber-81 (Mark 81 bomb w/ ROKETSAN Laser Guidance Kit)
  - HGK-82 (Mark 82 bomb w/ TUBITAK-SAGE Precision Guidance Kit)
  - KGK-82 (Mark 82 bomb w/ TUBITAK-SAGE Wing Assisted Guidance Kit)
  - Teber-82 (Mark 82 bomb w/ ROKETSAN Laser Guidance Kit)
  - HGK-83 (Mark 83 bomb w/ TUBITAK-SAGE Precision Guidance Kit)
  - KGK-83 (Mark 83 bomb w/ TUBITAK-SAGE Wing Assisted Guidance Kit)
  - HGK-84 (Mark 84 bomb w/ TUBITAK-SAGE Precision Guidance Kit)
  - LHGK-84 (Mark 84 bomb w/ TUBITAK-SAGE Laser Sensitive Guidance Kit)
  - SARB-83, Bunker buster
  - NEB-84, Bunker buster
  - MAM (Smart Micro Munition) (MAM-T variant)
  - KUZGUN-SS, Glide bomb
  - ASELSAN Miniature Bomb
- Integrated RF System (IRFS)
  - MURAD-600A AESA radar
  - Radar warning receiver
- Integrated Electro-Optical System (IEOS)
  - KARAT-200 Infrared Search and Track (IRST)
  - TOYGUN Electro-optical reconnaissance, surveillance and targeting system
  - İRİS-300 Missile approach warning system (IR-MWS/360° day/night imaging)
  - YILDIRIM-300 Directional Infrared Counter Measures (DIRCM)
  - LİAS-300 Laser warning receiver (LWS)
- Integrated Communications Navigation and IFF (ICNI)
  - ICNAir-ASQ9683 communications suite
  - ARVEN radio-navigation equipment
  - IdentIFF Mode-5 identification friend or foe
- Advanced Cockpit / Human Machine Interface
  - TULGAR Helmet-mounted display (HMDS)
  - LAD-208 Large area display (LAD)

== See also ==
- Fifth-generation fighter

Aircraft of comparable role, configuration, and era

- Chengdu J-20
- KAI KF-21 Boramae
- Lockheed Martin F-22 Raptor
- Lockheed Martin F-35 Lightning II
- Shenyang J-35
- Sukhoi Su-57
- Sukhoi Su-75

Related lists

- List of fighter aircraft
