= K30 Biho =

South Korean Self-propelled anti-aircraft weapon

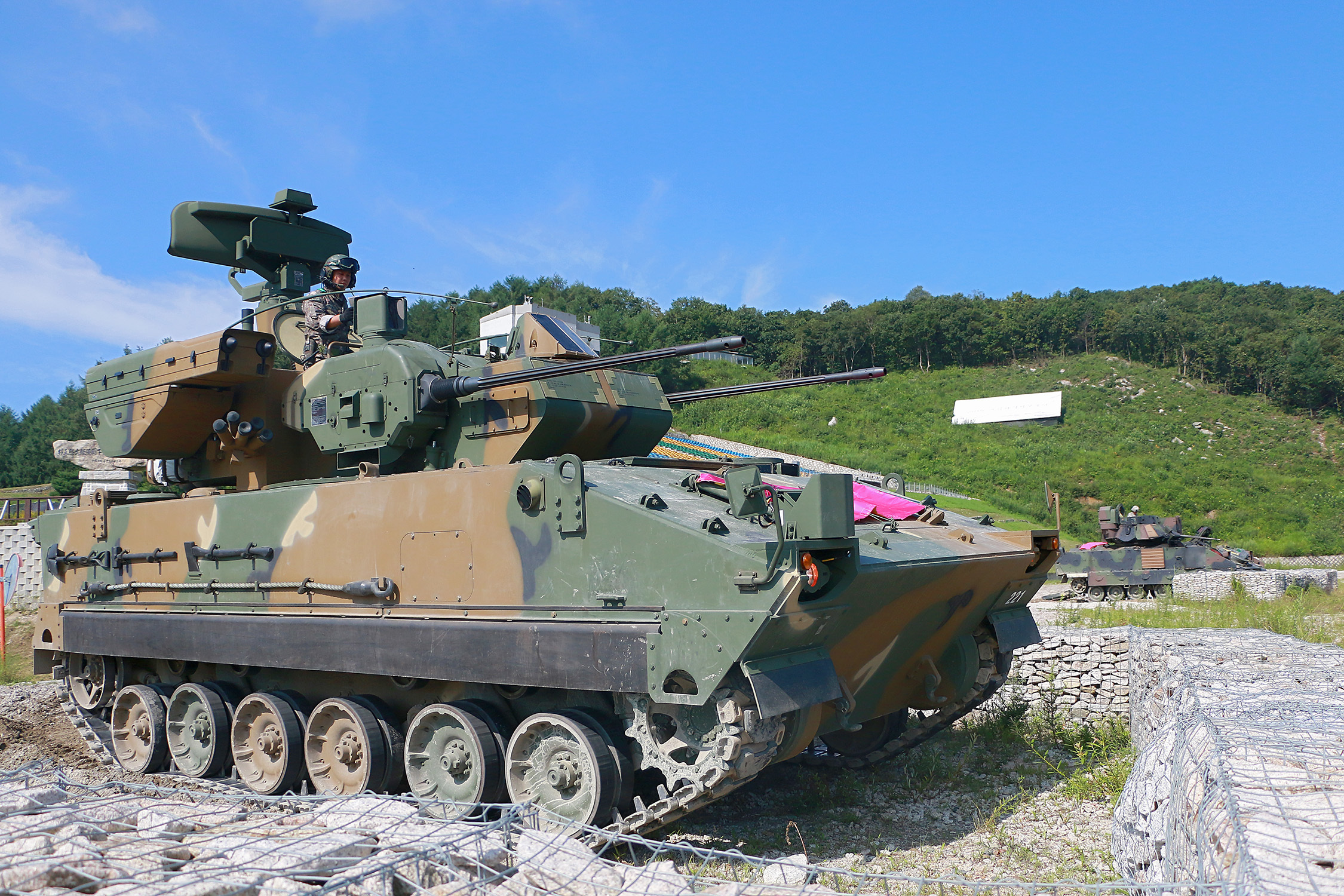
- Type: Self-propelled anti-aircraft gun
- Place of origin: South Korea

Service history
- In service: 1999–present
- Used by: See Users

Production history
- Designer: Agency for Defense Development
- Designed: 1983–1991
- Manufacturer: Hanwha Aerospace; LIG Defense & Aerospace
- Unit cost: 13,3 billion KRW (12.1 million USD)
- Produced: 1996–present
- No. built: 176

Specifications
- Mass: 26.5 metric tons (26.1 long tons; 29.2 short tons)
- Length: 6.77 meters (22 ft 3 in)
- Width: 3 meters (9 ft 10 in)
- Height: 4.05 meters (13 ft 3 in)
- Crew: 4
- Main armament: 2 × SNT Dynamics KKCB 30×170 mm autocannon
- Secondary armament: KP-SAM Chiron MANPADS
- Engine: MAN-Doosan D2840L 520 hp (388 kw) diesel engine
- Power/weight: 19.62 hp/t (14.63 kW/t)
- Transmission: S&T Dynamics HMPT500-3EK/4EK
- Suspension: Torsion bar
- Operational range: 500 km (310 mi)
- Maximum speed: 65 km/h (40 mph)

The South Korean K30 Biho (Korean: 비호, Hanja: 飛虎; literally "Flying Tiger") twin 30 mm self-propelled anti-aircraft weapon was developed to meet the operational requirements of the Republic of Korea Armed Forces for a highly mobile short range air defense system suited to the operational and terrain conditions of the Korean peninsula. It combines an electro-optically guided 30 mm gun system with a surveillance radar system on a K200 chassis. It supplements the K263A1 Chungung, a self-propelled 20 mm Vulcan system.

The K30 is primarily built by Hanwha Defense.

== History ==
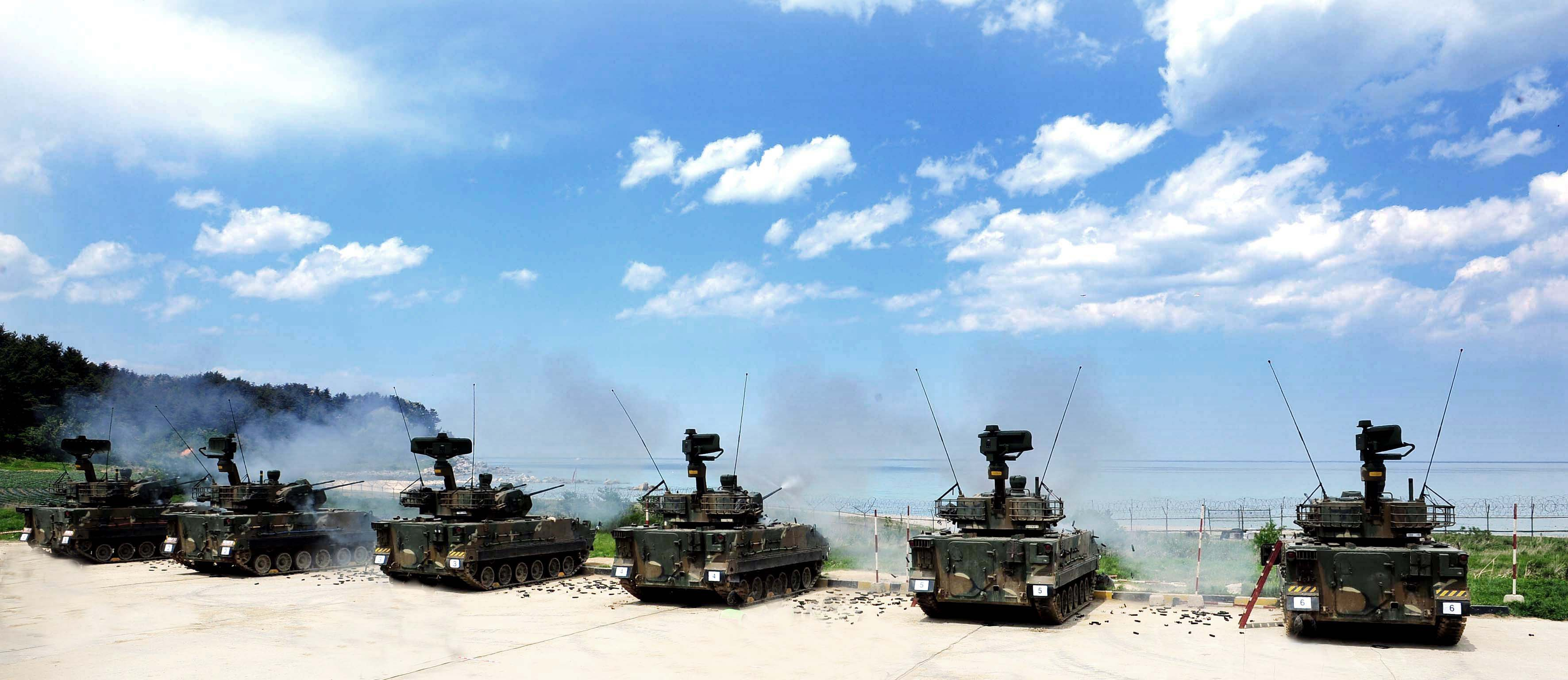
K30 self-propelled anti-aircraft vehicles of the 11th Division Air Defense Unit of the Republic of Korea Army under live fire training

The K30 was first announced as a project in 1983 with 600 personnel conducting research and around 10 billion won spent on R&D. In September 2001, the production of prototypes were done under Tong-il Heavy Industries before Doosan Infracore concluded a contract with Korea's Defense Acquisition Program in 2007. An initial order was made in 2002 to supply the K30.

The approximately W500 billion (US$543 million) follow-up order was delivered to the South Korean military, starting in 2008.

The K30 was included in the bid by India for a new SPAAG system in 2015 with tests conducted until 2017.

HDS announced that India selected the K30 to modernize its air defense systems. There were reports that an unnamed competitor had threatened to interfere with the contract signing alongside pro-Russian elements in the Indian government due to "bias" in the selection process.

In 2021, a wheeled variant of the K30 Biho, known as K30W Cheonho (Korean: 천호, Hanja: 天虎; literally "Sky Tiger"), anti-aircraft gun wheeled vehicle system (AAGW), entered service with the Republic of Korea Army. Sky Tiger features a modified K30 turret fitted to a 8×8 K808 armored personnel carrier and will replace the aging M167 Vulcan.

== General characteristics ==
A live fire exercise of the K30 Biho Air Defense Unit of the Republic of Korea Army

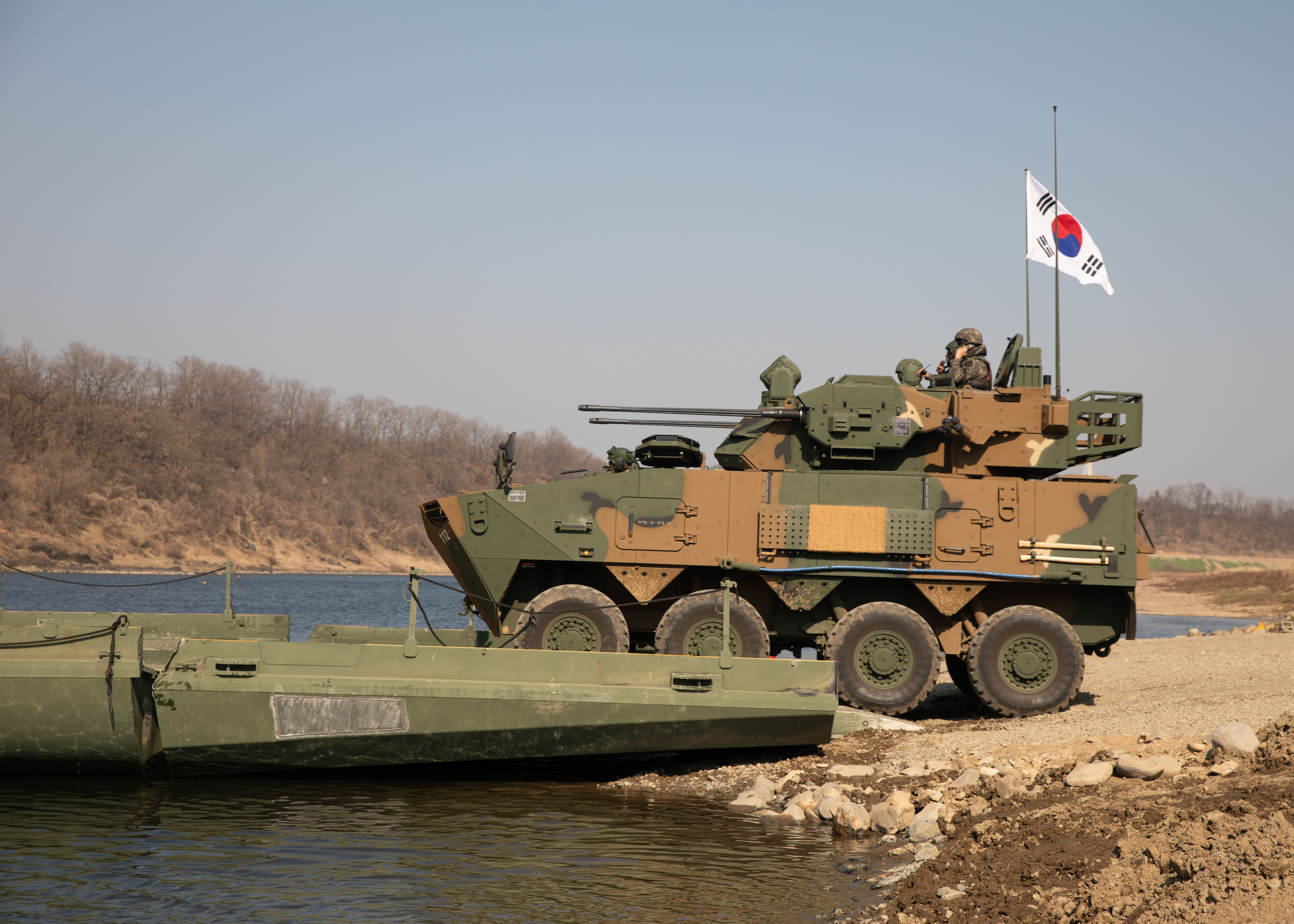
A K30W Cheonho anti-aircraft vehicle cross a newly constructed improved ribbon bridge during a wet gap crossing training

A K30 Biho system consists of twin KCB 30 mm guns, a TPS-830K surveillance and fire-control radar, an electro-optical targeting system (EOTS), panoramic periscope, forward looking infrared system (FLIR), laser rangefinder (LRF), thermal sight, a TV camera, and a digital fire-control system. The combined targeting system of EOTS, FLIR, and LRF has a targeting range of over 10 km (6.2 mi). The TPS-830K radar can detect and track a 2 m^{2} (22 ft^{2})-RCS target from a range of 17 km (11 mi). The cannons have a cyclic rate of fire of 600 rpm and an effective anti-aircraft range of 3,000 m (1.9 mi), and each is loaded with 300 rounds of (30×170 mm KCB) ammunition. In December 2013, DAPA announced that the Biho had been integrated with the Shingung surface-to-air missile to increase its coverage to 7 km. Two pods each containing two missiles are mounted, one of each side of the turret. Design integration with the missiles was completed in 2014, and by October 2015 the system was in full-rate production. The upgraded vehicle was in service by late 2018.

The TPS-830K radar of K30 is an X-band (8 to 12.5 GHz) surveillance and fire-control pulse-Doppler radar, specialized for use against low-flying aircraft. Its features include real-time early warning, multiple target detection, an integral L-band (1 to 2 GHz) Identification Friend or Foe (IFF) subsystem, pulse compression, frequency agility, and adaptive moving target indication as an anti-chaff measure. It supplies ballistic computation data to the digital fire-control system to direct the aim of the electro-optical targeting system, which then aligns the 30 mm guns with the target for accurate fire. The radar can be installed on a separate vehicle (usually a 5-ton six-wheeled truck with a self-towed generator unit) to serve as an independent surveillance platform for other short range air defense systems. The secondary FLIR system and laser rangefinder supplements the TPS-830K radar to provide additional targeting means in case the radar is rendered inoperative, or is turned off to retain the element of surprise against aircraft that are equipped with radar warning receivers.

The K30 adapts the chassis of the K200 infantry fighting vehicle, but has some differences. It has an extra roadwheel in its suspension and uses a D2840L engine instead of the D2848T engine of the K200, with an increase in engine power from 350 horsepower to 520 horsepower, necessary since the K30 weighs almost twice as much as the K200. Allison Transmission's X200-5K transmission is likewise replaced by S&T Dynamics' HMPT500-3EK/4EK to accommodate the more powerful engine. The modified chassis largely retains the protection and amphibious capability of the original chassis.

== Variants ==
- K30W Cheonho – An anti-aircraft vehicle that combines the K30 Biho's turret system with a K808 wheeled armored vehicle

== Operators ==
=== Current operators ===
- South Korea

=== Failed bids ===
- India: The system was shortlisted by Indian Army after it competed against the Tunguska-M1 and Pantsir-S1 in Indian Army's Self Propelled Air Defence Gun Missile System (SPAD-GMS) program, and a total of 104 units were ordered by India in May 2019 as a part of a $2.6 billion deal, but the order was cancelled in September 2020 in favour of indigenously developed system under the Atmanirbhar Bharat initiative. Hybrid Biho has recently been recognized as the effective Anti-Drone system, and related about India's "SPAD-GMS" project.

== See also ==
- Flakpanzer Gepard – (West Germany)
- Marksman – (United Kingdom)
- PZA Loara – (Poland)
- Type 87 – (Japan)
- 2K22 Tunguska – (Soviet Union)
- Type 95 – (China)
- PGZ-09 – (China)
