= Self-propelled anti-aircraft weapon =

Mobile vehicle with a dedicated anti-aircraft capability

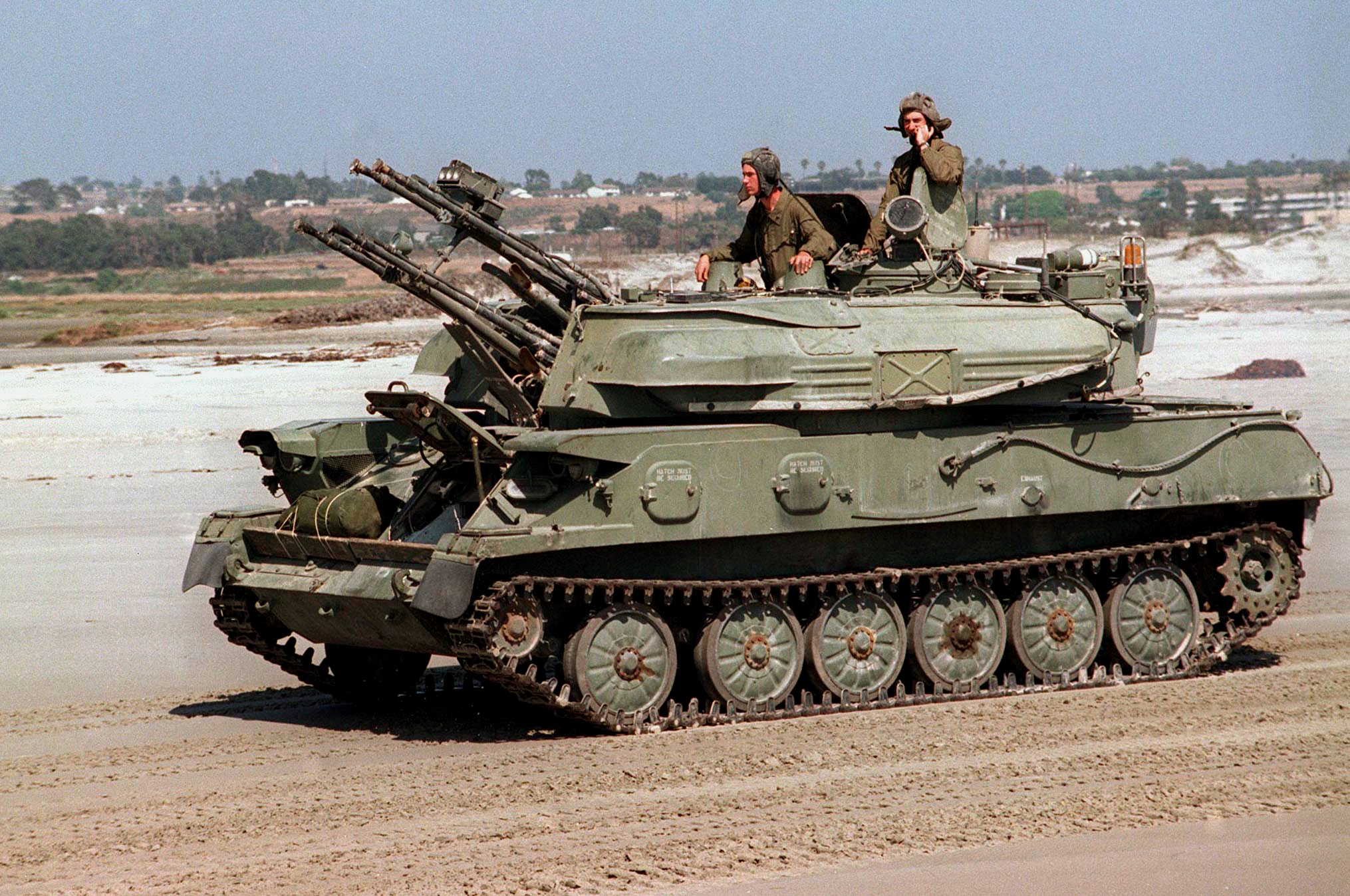
A Soviet-made ZSU-23-4 "Shilka" in California during a USMC exercise, 1997

An anti-aircraft vehicle, also known as a self-propelled anti-aircraft gun (SPAAG) or self-propelled air defense system (SPAD), is a mobile vehicle with a dedicated anti-aircraft capability.

Specific weapon systems used include machine guns, autocannons, larger guns, or surface-to-air missiles, and some mount both guns and longer-ranged missiles (e.g. the Pantsir missile system). Platforms used include both trucks and heavier combat vehicles such as armoured personnel carriers and tanks, which add protection from aircraft, artillery, and small arms fire for front line deployment.

Anti-aircraft guns are usually mounted in a quickly-traversing turret with a high rate of elevation, for tracking fast-moving aircraft. They are often in dual or quadruple mounts, allowing a high rate of fire. In addition, most anti-aircraft guns can be used in a direct-fire role against surface targets. Today, surface-to-air missiles (generally mounted on similar turrets) have largely supplanted anti-aircraft guns. However, the rise of drone warfare in the 2020s and the high cost of missiles have led to a resurgence of anti-aircraft vehicles in warfare using anti-aircraft guns.

== Examples ==
Some examples of modern SPAAG:

Model	Manufacturer	Image	Origin	Platforms	Weapons	Caliber and ammunitions	Number built	Notes
CS/SA5 SPAAG	Norinco	—	China	Type 08	1 × 30mm rotary cannon (6 barrels) 2 × FN-6A	30 × 113 mm —	—	
PGZ-95 SPAAA	Norinco		China	—	4 × PG-87 4 × QW-2 IR missiles	25 x 183 mmB	~ 270	
PGZ-04/A SPAAA	Norinco		China	—	4 × Type 87 4 × FN-6 IR missiles	25 x 183 mmB	~ 270	Upgraded variant of PGZ-95 SPAAA
PGZ-09 SPAAA	Norinco		China	PLZ-05 chassis	2 × PG99 (Note: License produced Oerlikon GDF-002 by China.)	35 x 228 mm	—	
PGZ 625 PGL-XX (Code name 625)	Norinco	—	China	Type 08	1 × Rotary cannon (6 barrels) 4 to 8 × FN-16 (for PGZ 625E)	25 × 287 mm	—	
PGL-12 (Type 12)	Norinco	—	China	Type 08	1 × 35 mm revolver cannon 4 × FN-6 in PGZ-04A pod.	35 x 228 mm	—	
Machbet	IAI (Israeli Aircraft Industries)		Israel	M113	1 × M61A1 Vulcan rotary cannon (6 barrels) 4 × FIM-92 Stinger	20 × 102 mm —	—	Entered service in 1997, retired in 2006
OTOMATIC "OTO Main Anti-aircraft Tank for Intercept and Combat"	OTO-Melara		Italy	Hulls of the: Leopard 1A2; OF-40 Mk.2; Palmaria	1 × Cannone 76/62 OTO-Breda Super Rapido	76 × 636 mmR	2	
SIDAM 25	OTO Breda		Italy	M113	4 × Oerlikon KBA	25 × 137 mm	275	
Stryker M-SHORAD "Maneuver Short Range Air Defense"	Leonardo DRS		ItalyUnited States	Stryker	1 × XM914 (M230LF chain gun) 1 M240 (7.62mm) 4 × FIM-92 Stinger 2 × AGM-114L Hellfire	30 × 113 mm 7.62 × 51 mm — —	312 to 361	
Type 87 SPAAG	MHI (Mitsubishi Heavy Industries)		Japan	Type 74 tank	2 × Oerlikon KDA (Note: Cannon used on the GDF-001, GDF-002, GDF-003 and GDF-005, without programmable ammunition capacity, using HE rounds.)	35 x 228 mm HEI ammunition	52	
Kongsberg RS6 MADIS RWS MK2 "Marine Air Defense Integrated System US Marine Corps Ground Based Air Defense"	Kongsberg	—	Norway	Oshkosh JLTV	1 × XM914E1 (M230LF chain gun) 1 × M240C (7.62mm) 2 × Air-to-Air Stinger	30 × 113 mm 7.62 × 51 mm —	—	Future USMC SHORAD system
PZA Loara	Radwar		Poland	T-72M chassis	2 × Oerlikon KDA	35 x 228 mm HEI ammunition	2 – 4	
SA-35	PIT-Radwar PGZ (Polska Grupa Zbrojeniowa)	—	Poland	Jelcz 6×6	1 × Oerlikon KDA	35 x 228 mm Air burst programmable rounds	—	Developed from AM-35K naval gun.
ZSU-23-4MP Biała	ZMT SA (Zakłady Mechaniczne Tarnów)		Poland	—	4 × AZP-23 4 × Grom IR missiles	23 × 152 mm —	~ 70	Polish modernised variant
Mangart 25	Valhalla Turrets		Slovenia	Oshkosh JLTV	1 × Oerlikon KBA 1 × FN MAG Option for short-range IR missiles	25 × 137 mm 7.62 × 51 mm	—	
K263 Cheongoong SPAAG	Doosan		South Korea	K200A1 KIFV	1 × KM167 A1 VADS Rotary cannon (6 barrels)	20 × 102 mm	200	
K30 Bi Ho "Flying Tiger"	Doosan		South Korea	K200A1 KIFV	2 × Oerlikon KCB	30 × 170 mm	176	
K30 Bi Ho Hybrid "Flying Tiger"	Hanwha Aerospace LIG Nex1		South Korea	K808 White Tiger	2 × Oerlikon KCB 2 × LIG Nex1 Chiron	30 × 170 mm —	—	
K30 Bi Ho II "Flying Tiger"	Joint venture Hanwha Aerospace SAMI (Saudi Arabian Military Industries)	—	South Korea Saudi Arabia	K808 White Tiger	1 × Oerlikon KCB-B 4 SAM	30 × 170 mm Air burst programmable munitions —	—	In development
Lvkv 9040 Luftvärnskanonvagn 9040	BAE Systems Bofors		Sweden	CV90	1 × 40 mm Bofors L/70B autocannon	40 × 365 mm	30	
Flakpanzer Gepard	Oerlikon Contraves Siemens-Albis Krauss-Maffei		SwitzerlandGermany	Leopard 1	2 × Oerlikon KDA	35 x 228 mm HEI ammunition	570	
Flakpanzer Gepard 1A2	Oerlikon Contraves Siemens-Albis Krauss-Maffei		SwitzerlandGermany	Leopard 1	2 × Rheinmetall KDG 35/1000 (Note: Cannon used since Oerlikon GDF-006 series with AHEAD programmable ammunition capacity.)	35 x 228 mm Airburst programmable rounds AHEAD	570	
Skyranger 30	Rheinmetall Air Defence (Oerlikon)		SwitzerlandGermany	Boxer A3 / tracked; KF-41 Lynx; Pandur 6×6 EVO; Piranha IV and V; PMMC G5	Oerlikon KCE Option for short-range IR missiles (FIM-92 Stinger or Mistral)	30 × 173 mm Air burst programmable rounds AHEAD —	93 ordered (48 more planned, 9 in option)	
Skyranger 35	Rheinmetall Air Defence (Oerlikon)		SwitzerlandGermany	Boxer A3 / tracked; KF-41 Lynx; Leopard 2; Piranha IV and V	1 × Rheinmetall KDG 35/1000	35 x 228 mm Air burst programmable rounds AHEAD	—	Turret based on Skyshield / MANTIS
GÜRZ	Aselsan	—	Turkey	Seyit 8×8 (Anadolu Savunma)	1 × KDC-02 4 × Bozdoğan IR missile	35 x 228 mm ATOM airburst —	—	Comparable to Pantsir, in development
KORKUT	Aselsan	(Turret adapted to land platform)	Turkey	ACV-30 (FNSS); Arma 8×8 (Otokar)	2 × KDC-02 (Note: License produced Oerlikon GDF-002 by MKE using the programmable ATOM 35mm ammunition.)	35 x 228 mm ATOM airburst	13	
Marksman	Marconi Electronic Systems		United Kingdom	T-55AM; Leopard 2A4	2 × Oerlikon KDA	35 x 228 mm HEI ammunition	7	

== See also ==
- 4M (artillery)
- Assault gun
- Flakpanzer, a collective term for German anti-aircraft tanks, particularly those used in World War II.
- List of anti-aircraft guns
- Man-portable air-defense system
- Self-propelled artillery
- Tank destroyer
