= Loara =

Loara may refer to:

- PZA Loara, a Polish anti-aircraft artillery system
- Loara High School, in Anaheim, California, United States
- Loarists, fictional people in "Black Friar of the Flame" by Isaac Asimov
