= K808 White Tiger =

Korean wheeled armored personnel carrier

K808/806 White Tiger
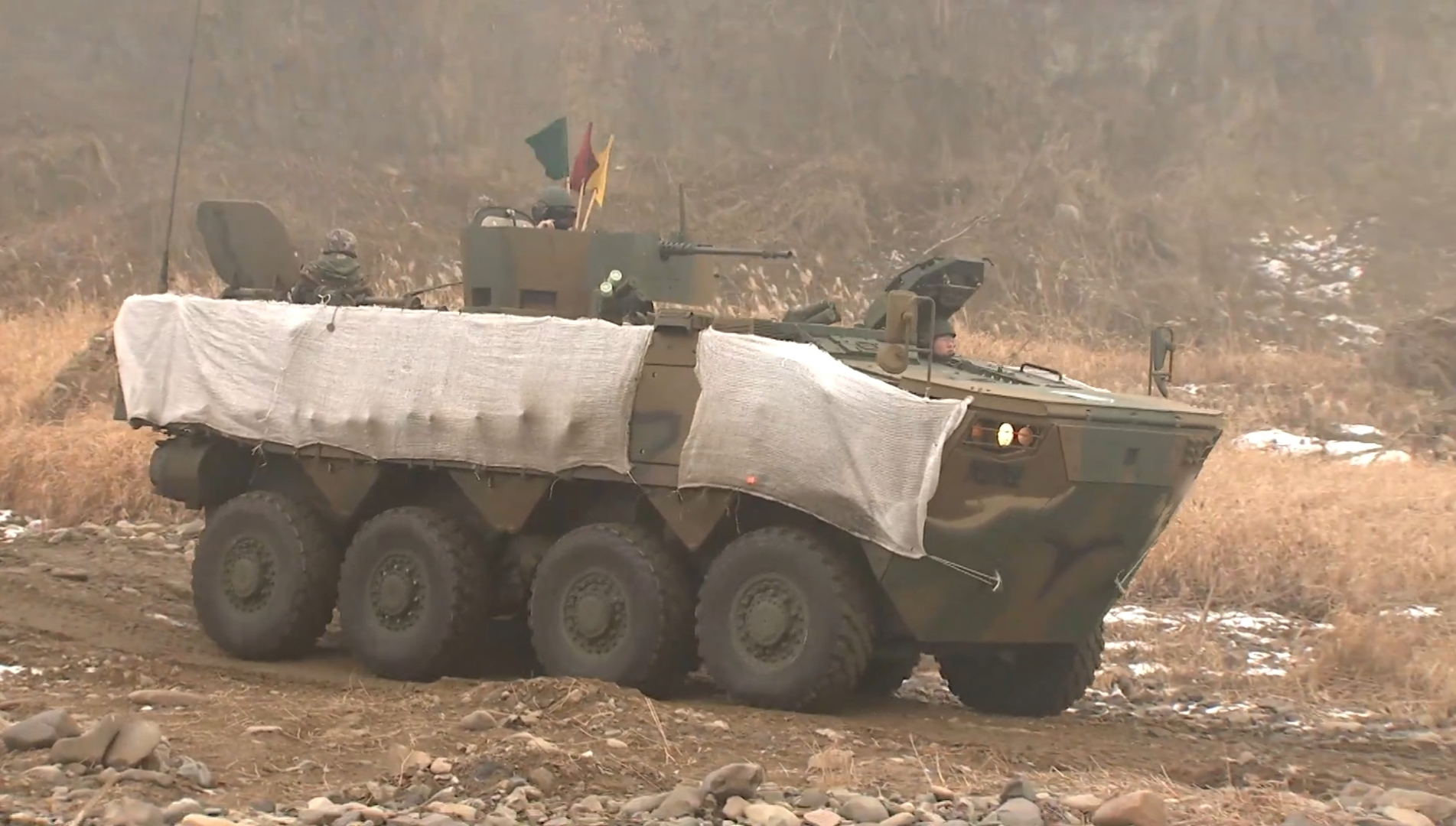
- Type: Armored Personnel Carrier
- Place of origin: South Korea

Service history
- In service: 2018–present
- Used by: See Operators

Production history
- Designer: Hyundai Rotem
- Designed: 2012–2016
- Manufacturer: Hyundai Rotem
- Produced: 2016–present
- Variants: See Variants

Specifications
- Mass: K808: 20 metric tons (20 long tons; 22 short tons); K806: 16 metric tons (16 long tons; 18 short tons)
- Length: K808: 7.2 meters (23 ft 7 in); K806: 6.6 meters (21 ft 8 in)
- Width: 2.1 meters (6 ft 11 in)
- Height: 2.7 meters (8 ft 10 in)
- Crew: 2 (commander and driver), more depending on configuration
- Passengers: K808: 1–10; K806: 1–9
- Armor: Samyang Comtech Ceramic / Polymer matrix composites
- Main armament: K808: K4 grenade launcher, or K6 heavy machine gun K806: K3 light machine gun
- Secondary armament: K808: 12.7 mm / 30 mm RCWS; K806: 40 mm AGL / 12.7 mm RCWS
- Engine: Hyundai Motors D6HA 10L V6 diesel K808: 420 hp (310 kW); K806: 400 hp (300 kW)
- Power/weight: K808: 21 hp/t (15.44 kW/t); K806: 25 hp/t (18.38 kW/t)
- Suspension: Independent Hydropneumatic Suspension Unit (HSU)
- Operational range: 700–800 km (430–500 mi)
- Maximum speed: 100 km/h (62 mph) (road); 8 km/h (5.0 mph; 4.3 kn) (water)

The K808/806 White Tiger (Korean: 백호 "Baekho", Hanja: 白虎) wheeled armored personnel carrier (APC) is family of 8×8 and 6×6 armored vehicles. Developed by Hyundai Rotem as a private venture in 2012, the Korean Army declared a plan to acquire 600 6×6 and 8×8 wheeled APCs in order to help build rapid response forces modeled after U.S. Stryker combat brigades, according to the Defense Acquisition Program Administration (DAPA).

Hyundai Rotem, a subsidiary of Hyundai Motor Group, made the K808/806 in competition with the Doosan Black Fox and Samsung Techwin MPV, and eventually won the competition.

== Development ==
On 9 May 2016, the vehicles, officially designated as the K808 and K806, passed their final qualification tests, allowing for production to begin for deployment the next year; 600 units were to be produced by 2023. The wheeled vehicles were created to enhance the mobility and striking power of infantry over the slower K200 and K21 tracked vehicles. The K808 is designed for fast troop deployment and reconnaissance missions in front-line areas while the K806 is intended for mobile strike and reconnaissance missions in the rear. Their wheeled designs make them better suited for contributing to United Nations peacekeeping operations and finding export markets.

Hyundai Rotem expected an order by October 2016 for 16 low-rate initial production vehicles to be delivered to the ROKA for field trials, scheduled to last until late 2017. Production would then commence in 2018 at a rate of 100 per year. Out of 600 total wheeled armored vehicles (WAVs), there would be 100 K806 and 500 K808, designated K806 and K808 in ROKA service, respectively.

Although the two variants share many performance characteristics, they have different concepts of operations: the 16-tonne (17.6-ton) K806 can perform rear-echelon roles such as facility defence and logistics convoy protection, while the 20-tonne (22-ton) K808 can conduct high-intensity combat operations alongside K1A1 and K2 main battle tanks.

In September 2018, the Defense Acquisition Program Administration announced Hyundai Rotem would begin mass-producing the K806 and K808 vehicles later in the year.

== Design ==
The engine is located in the front on the left side. The driver sits beside the engine to the right. The troop compartment is at the rear, accommodating ten fully equipped soldiers plus two crew members. Troops enter and exit the vehicle via a rear automatic ramp, in addition to four roof hatches.

=== Protection ===
The K808/806 has an all-welded armored hull that provides protection against small-arms fire and artillery shell splinters. It can be fitted with add-on armor for a higher level of protection. It is equipped with an NBC protection system. The 8×8 version is more heavily armored than the 6×6 version.

=== Engine ===
Initially, the K808/806 Scorpion was fitted with a 380 hp Hyundai diesel engine. This was later replaced by a 420 hp Hyundai engine, with a seven-speed transmission and two-mode secondary transmission. This engine is used in 8×8 configuration. The vehicle has an automatic drive-line management system, central tire inflation system, and run-flat tires. The Scorpion 8×8 is fully amphibious, propelled by two water jets, but the Scorpion 6×6 is not.

=== Weapons ===
The vehicle has a remotely controlled weapon station armed with a 40 mm automatic grenade launcher or 12.7 mm machine gun. It can support a two-man turret, armed with a 30 mm cannon and coaxial 7.62 mm machine gun. It can feature a manned weapon station with a 40 mm grenade launcher and 7.62 mm machine gun. In Korean service, the K806/K808 will be outfitted with a one-person protected weapon station armed with an M2HB machine gun rather than an RWS, to reduce acquisition costs, although the company could supply such systems if requested.

In June 2020, Hanwha Defense was given a contract to deliver the K30W Cheonho (Korean: 천호, Hanja: 天虎; literally "sky tiger") 30 mm Anti-Aircraft Gun-Wheeled Vehicle System (AAGW) to the ROK military, a K808 chassis fitted with the twin 30 mm cannon turret of the K30 Biho. It has greater range than the Vulcan Air Defense System (VADS) it will replace. Deployment began in December 2021 and will continue until the early 2030s.

== Variants ==
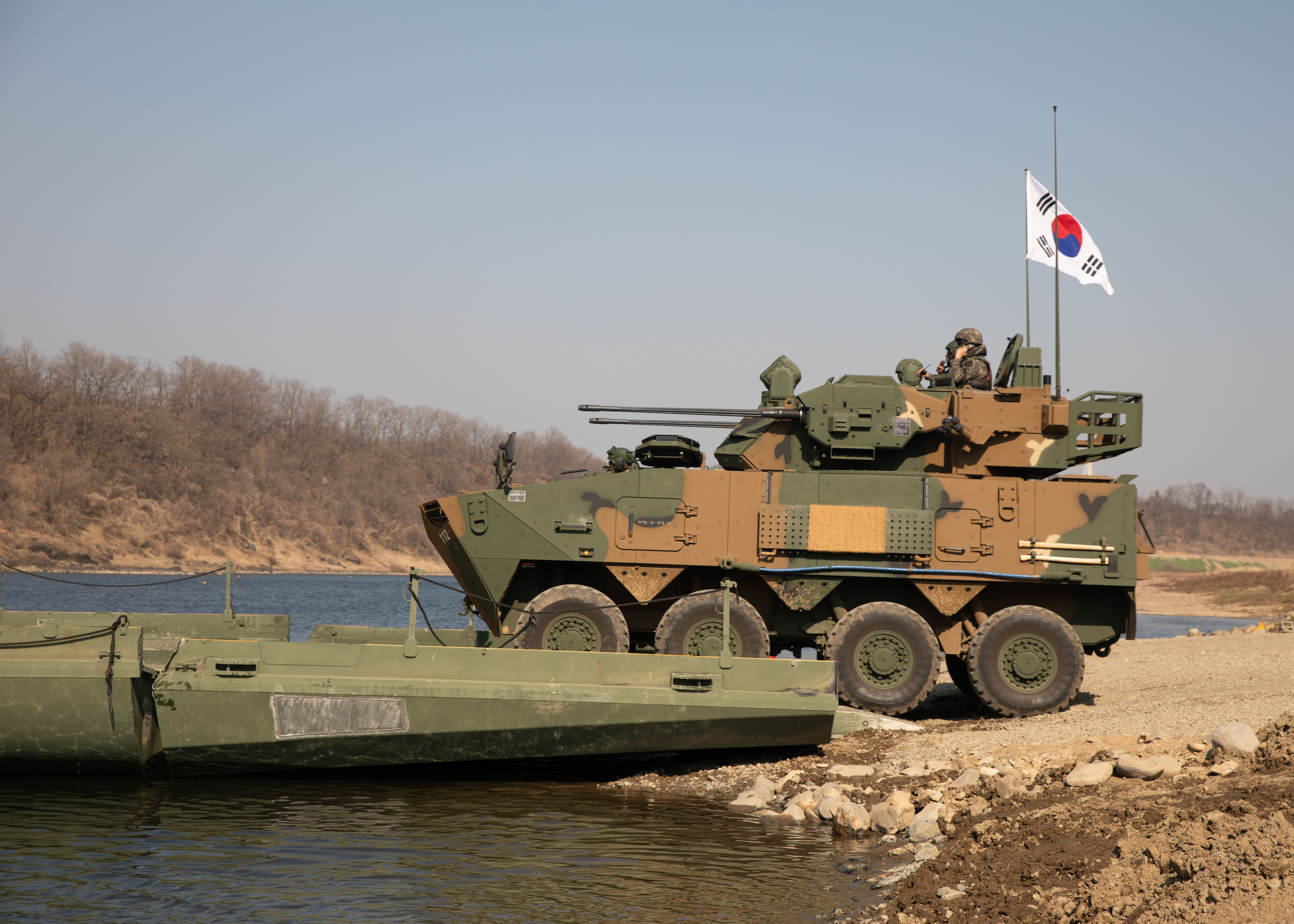
A K30W Cheonho anti-aircraft vehicle crossing a newly constructed improved ribbon bridge during a wet gap crossing training.

- KW1 medical evacuation vehicle (MEV), based on the 6×6 chassis.
- KW1 Armored Combat Vehicle (ACV), based on the 6×6 chassis.
- KW1 Mobile Gun System (MGS), armed with 90 mm gun, based on the 6×6 chassis.
- KW2 8×8 armored personnel carrier (APC), based on the 6×6 chassis.
- KW2 Jupiter 8×8 fire support vehicle, armed with a 120 mm gun, based on the 8×8 chassis.
- KW2 120 mm mortar carrier, based on the 8×8 chassis.
- KW2 Command Post, based on the 8×8 chassis.
- KW2 Anti-Tank Vehicle, features RCWS with 30 mm cannon and two Raybolt ATGMs, based on the 8×8 chassis.
- K30W Cheonho – A 30 mm self-propelled anti-aircraft vehicle that combines the turrets of the K30 Biho, based on the 8×8 chassis.

== Operators ==
=== Current ===
South Korea
In use by the South Korean army

=== Future ===
Peru
In May 2024, Hyundai Rotem announced that 30 amphibious K808 vehicles would be exported to Peru under a contract worth 60 million USD.

=== Bid ===
Chile (> 200)
The Chilean Army has been looking for a successor to its 160 Piraña I 6×6 and 30 Piraña I 8×8. Long-term, more than 200 vehicles are expected to be purchased, with a first phase including a tender for 82 8×8 armoured vehicles, with a deadline of 8 April 2025. The K808 White Tiger is one of the competitors for the contract.

== See also ==
Comparable vehicles

- Stryker – (United States, Canada)
- LAV III/LAV AFV/LAV-25 – (Canada)
  - ASLAV – (Australia)
- Boxer – (Germany, Netherlands)
- BTR-90 – (Russia)
- VPK-7829 Bumerang – (Russia)
- ZBL-08 – (China)
- Clouded Leopard – (Taiwan)
- Type 96 armored personnel carrier – (Japan)
- Patria AMV – (Finland)
- BTR-4 – (Ukraine)
- Saur 2 – (Romania)
- KTO Rosomak – (Poland)
- FNSS Pars – (Turkey)
- MOWAG Piranha – (Switzerland)
- Terrex ICV – (Singapore)
