= Oerlikon 30 mm twin cannon =

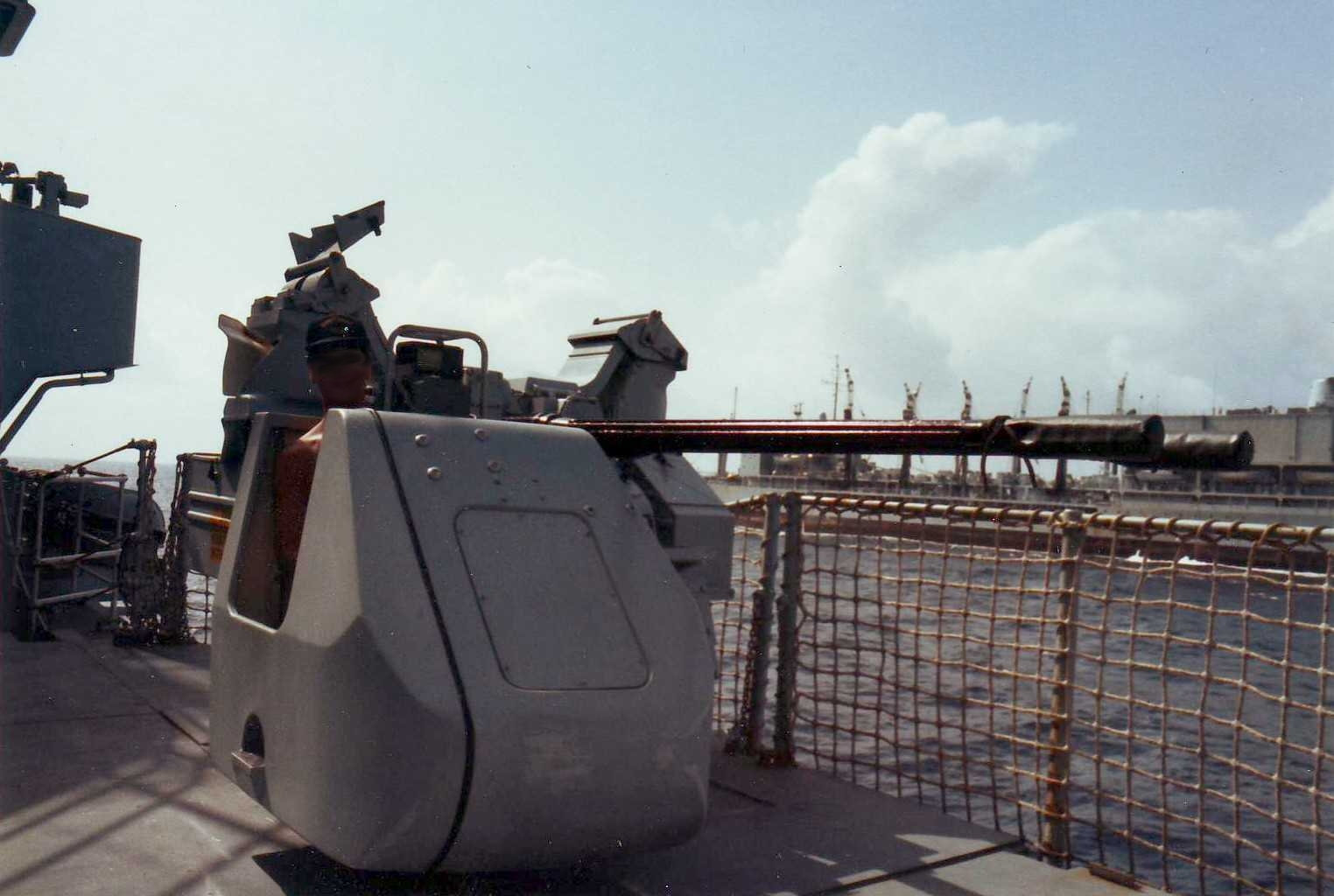
An Oerlikon 30 mm twin cannon on HMS Cardiff

The Oerlikon 30 mm twin cannon is an anti aircraft gun, incorporating two Oerlikon KCB, used by the Royal Navy. They were fitted to Type 42 destroyers after the Falklands War to improve defence against air attack.
