= Type 87 self-propelled anti-aircraft gun =

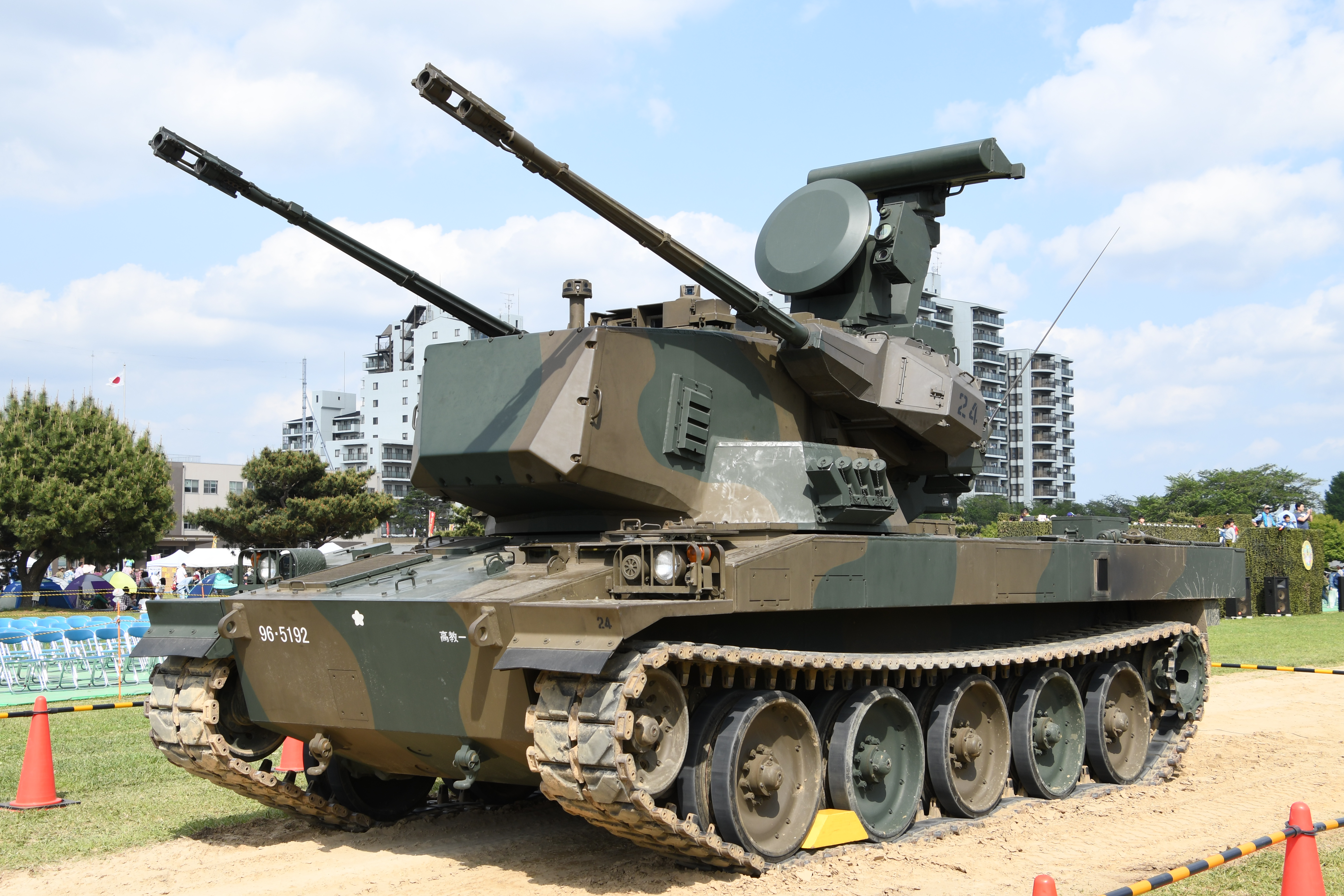
- A Type 87 self-propelled anti-aircraft gun at Camp Shimoshizu, Chiba Prefecture
- Type: Self-propelled anti-aircraft gun
- Place of origin: Japan

Service history
- In service: 1987–…
- Used by: Japan Ground Self-Defense Force

Production history
- Designer: Technical Research and Development Institute
- Designed: 1982–1986
- Manufacturer: Mitsubishi Heavy Industries (chassis), Japan Steel Works (guns, turret)
- Unit cost: 1.4 billion yen
- Produced: 1987–2002
- No. built: 52

Specifications
- Mass: 38.0 t (37.4 long tons; 41.9 short tons)
- Length: 7.99 m (26.2 ft)
- Width: 3.18 m (10.4 ft)
- Height: 3.25 m (10.7 ft) (radar retracted); 4.40 m (14.4 ft) (radar erected)
- Crew: 3 (commander, driver, gunner)
- Shell: 35×228 mm
- Caliber: 35 mm (1.4 in)
- Elevation: -5°…+85°
- Traverse: 360°
- Rate of fire: 1,100 rpm (550 rpm per gun)
- Muzzle velocity: 1,175 m/s (3,850 ft/s) (HEI, SAPHEI); 1,385 m/s (4,540 ft/s) (APDS)
- Effective firing range: 4,000 m (13,000 ft)
- Armor: steel (chassis), aluminium (turret)
- Main armament: 2×Oerlikon 35 mm KDA autocannon
- Engine: Mitsubishi 10ZF22WT 2-stroke V10 air-cooled turbocharged diesel 720 hp (540 kW) (2,200 rpm)
- Power/weight: 18.9 hp/t (14.1 kW/t)
- Suspension: hydropneumatic suspension
- Fuel capacity: 950 L (210 imp gal; 250 US gal)
- Operational range: 300 km (190 mi)
- Maximum speed: 53 km/h (33 mph)

The Type 87 self-propelled anti-aircraft gun (87式自走高射機関砲, 87-shiki jisō kōsha kikanhō) is a Japanese air defence weapon built around the Oerlikon 35 mm twin cannon system also used on the Gepard self-propelled anti-aircraft gun. It uses a modified Type 74 tank chassis built by Mitsubishi Heavy Industries, that mounts a turret and license produced guns by Japan Steel Works. The Type 87 is also known as the 87AW in the Japan Ground Self-Defense Force, although field officers have nicknamed the self-propelled gun Guntank after the similar-looking mecha in the Mobile Suit Gundam series.

== Development ==
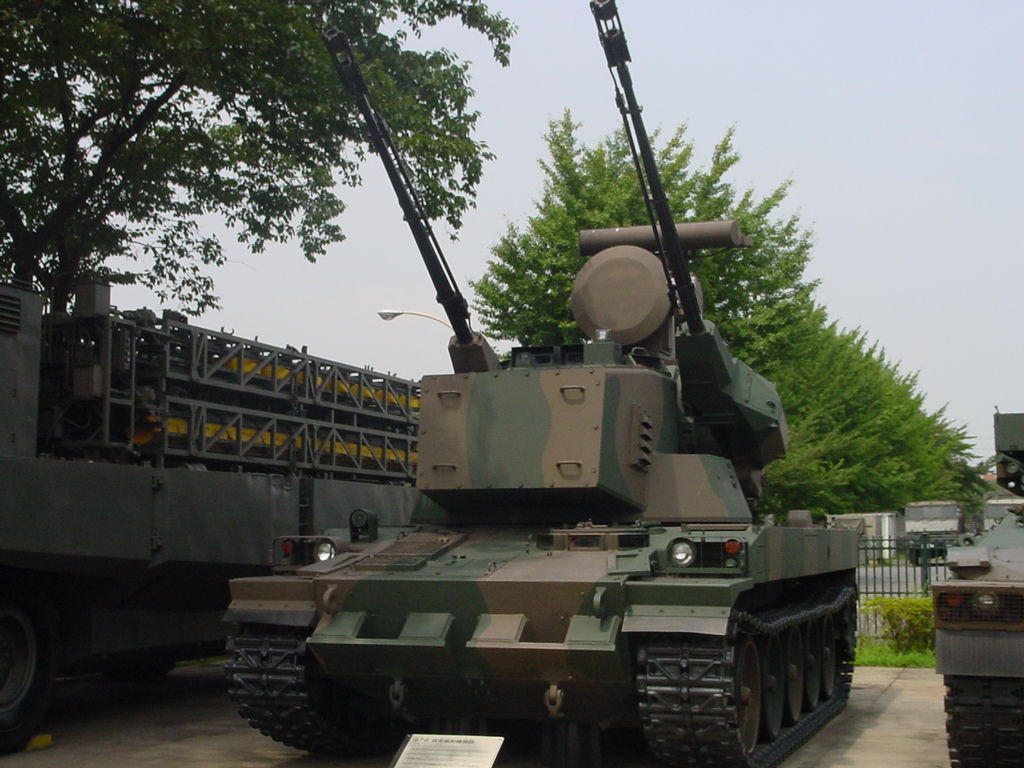
A Type 87 self-propelled anti-aircraft gun prototype, which was also used for testing the Type 92 mine roller, at the Japan Ground Self-Defense Force Public Information Center.

In the 1960s, rapidly developing jet aircraft technology highlighted the shortcomings of the Japanese Ground Self-Defense Force's existing anti-aircraft guns. M42 Dusters provided by the United States relied on optical sights and had no radar, which made targeting fast, low-flying aircraft difficult. Procuring Oerlikon GDF-001 35 mm towed anti-aircraft guns (designated L-90 in the Japan Ground Self-Defense Force) with Super Fledermaus fire control system produced under license between 1971 and 1981 mitigated the limitations. Although the requirement for a modern self-propelled anti-aircraft gun was still unfulfilled.

The L-90 was a capable system for its time, which led to the decision to mount the entire system on a single vehicle. The Technical Research and Development Institute began initial research and development efforts to achieve that in 1976. In 1978, the first prototype was completed.

The initial prototype was built on the Type 61 tank chassis, equipped with two Oerlikon 35 mm KDA autocannons, and a domestically developed fire control system. Tests showed that the weight of the turret with the radar and fire control systems overburdened the Type 61 chassis. Therefore, development started on modifying the Type 74 chassis for the role instead.

Development and prototyping of the self-propelled anti-aircraft gun on the Type 74 chassis began in 1982. The first prototype was completed in late 1983 and underwent technical testing in 1984–1985. Practical testing was conducted in 1986, and the Type 87 self-propelled anti-aircraft gun was officially accepted into Japan Ground Self-Defense Force service in 1987.

== Characteristics ==
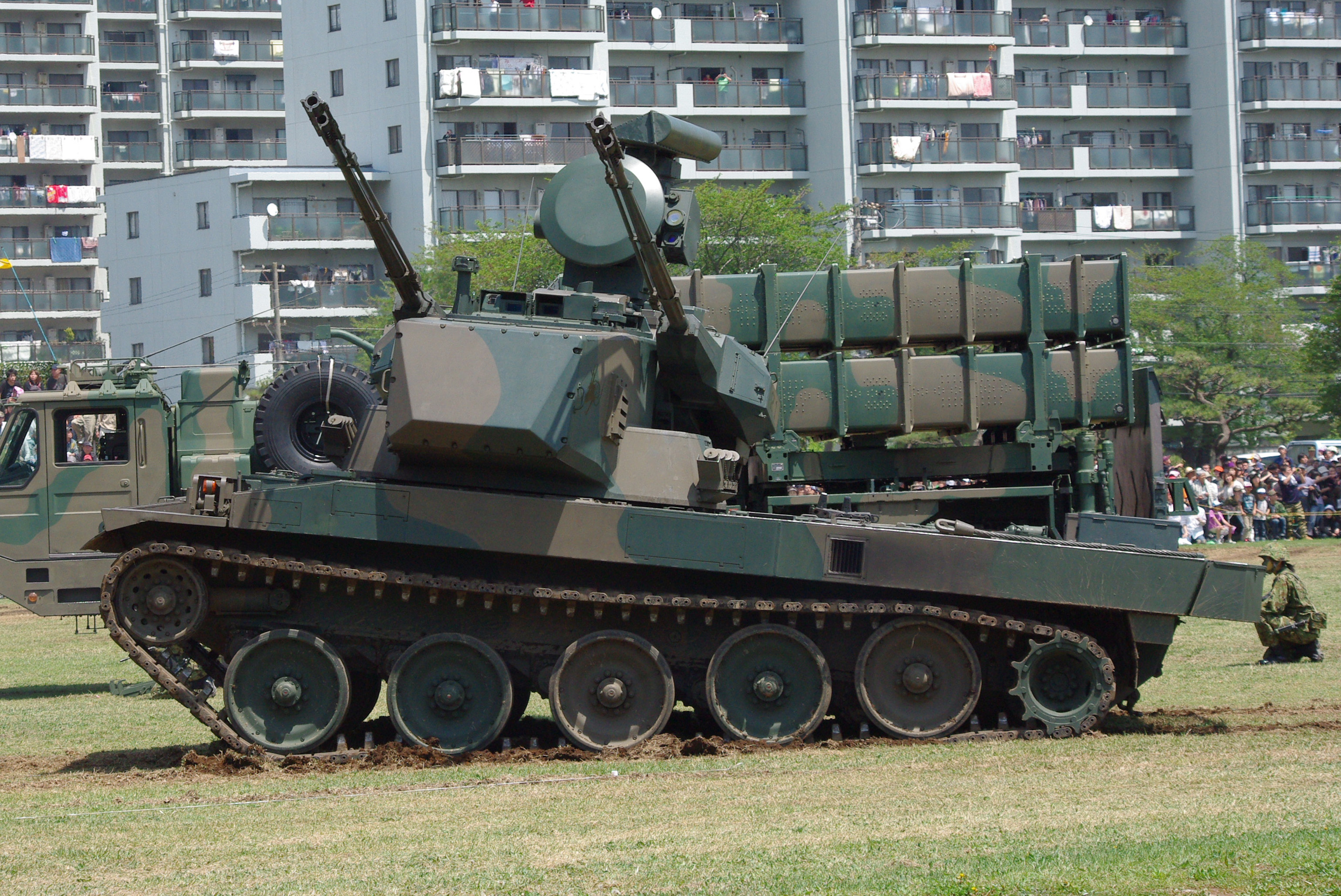
The Type 87 inherits its hydropneumatic suspension from the Type 74 tank.

The Type 87 self-propelled anti aircraft gun looks similar to the Gepard, but has a smaller turret and weighs significantly less. Both vehicles are based on a tank chassis – the Type 74 and Leopard 1, respectively – and use Oerlikon's 35 mm twin guns. Instead of mounting the fire control radar on the turret front like the Gepard, the Type 87's fire control radar is located on top of the turret, reportedly due to patent issues.

The chassis is welded of rolled homogeneous armour plates and retains the Type 74's hydropneumatic suspension, engine, transmission, and other automotive components. The Type 87's chassis exterior differs from the Type 74 chassis it is based on, with the most discernable differences being the Type 87's vertical side armour and additional storage on the rear. Due to the vehicle's increased electrical power requirements, a new auxiliary power unit is installed in the front right section of the chassis, in addition to the Mitsubishi 10ZF22WT two-stroke V10 air-cooled turbocharged diesel engine in the rear. The driver is seated in the front left and both the commander and the gunner are in the turret above the middle section of the chassis.

The Type 87 is armed with two 35 mm Oerlikon KDA autocannons that have 90-caliber barrels. The guns are mounted on both sides of the turret, while ammunition is stored in a magazine in the turret basket (HEI and SAPHEI) and in armoured boxes outside the turret (APDS). Each gun has a firing rate of 550 rounds per minute, with 310 rounds of anti-air and 20 rounds of anti-armour ammunition available per gun. The autocannons can be used for attacking aerial and ground targets, although the 35 mm shells lack proximity fuses and the guns cannot use AHEAD ammunition. For self-defence, the Type 87 has triple 60 mm (vehicles produced before 1992) or quadruple 76 mm (vehicles produced in 1992 or later) smoke grenade launchers, which are automatically triggered by a laser warning receiver.

The rear of the turret is equipped with a rod-shaped pulse-Doppler search radar that has a range of approximately 20 km (12 mi), and a dish-shaped fire control radar. Although it is not possible to simultaneously engage multiple targets, searching for multiple targets simultaneously is possible. The Type 87 is also equipped with an optical sight, a night vision device, a laser rangefinder, and other backup targeting devices.

== Operational history ==
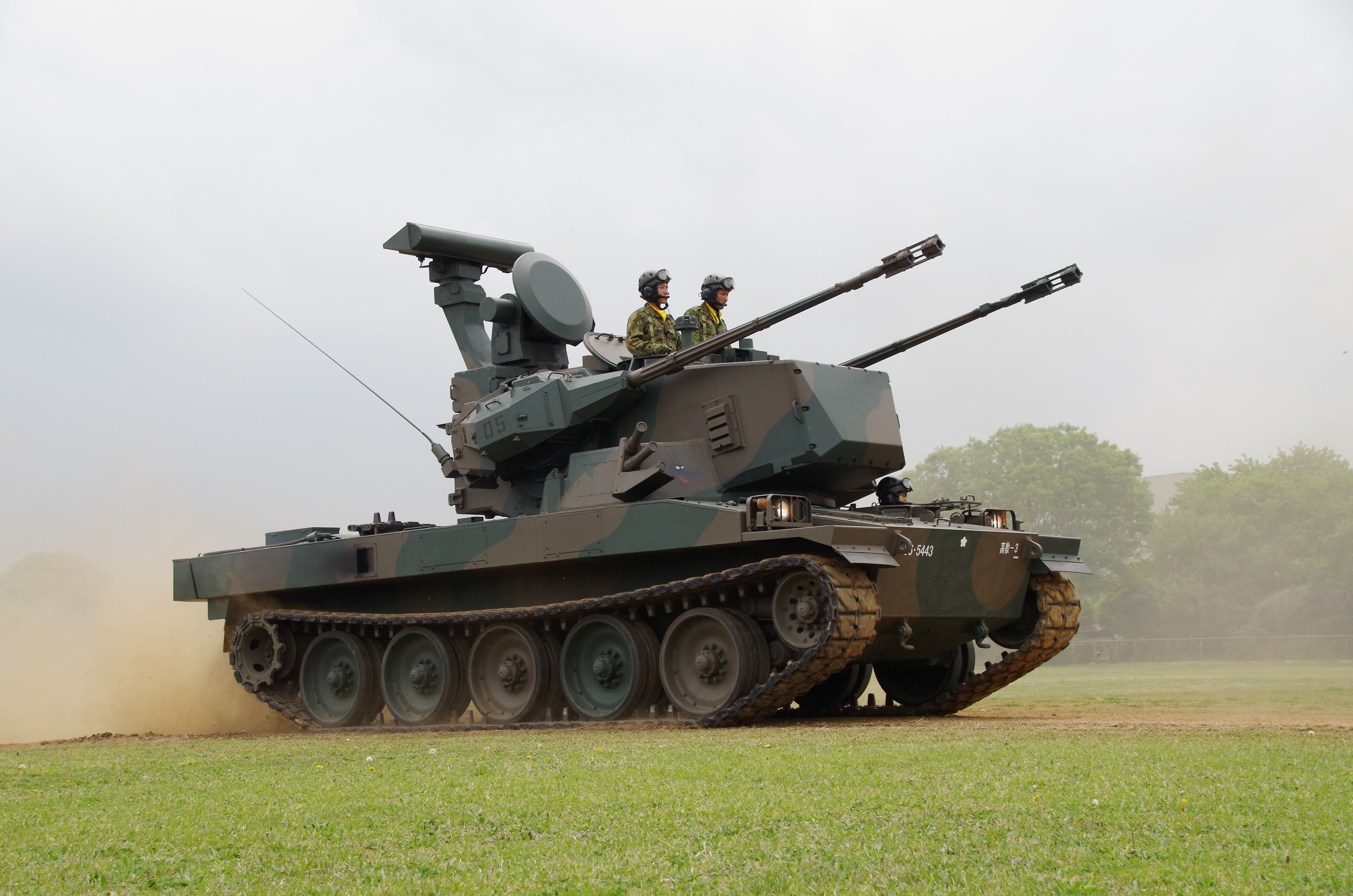
A Type 87 from the Japan Ground Self-Defense Force Air Defense School at Camp Shimoshizu

The Type 87 self-propelled anti-aircraft gun replaced multiple legacy self-propelled anti-aircraft guns in Japan Ground Self-Defense Force. In addition to M42 Dusters, Type 87s replaced the remaining M15A1s in service.

First Type 87s were procured in 1987. Due to its comparatively high cost of 1.4 billion yen per vehicle, annual production numbers remained low. Procurement of the Type 87 ended in 2002, after 52 self-propelled anti-aircraft guns had been built.

The towed L-90 anti-aircraft guns that the Type 87 is based on were retired by 2009 in favour of the Type 93 surface-to-air missile. The Type 87 continues to serve in the Japan Ground Self-Defense Force into the 2020s and foreseeably beyond. According to Japan's report to the United Nations Register of Conventional Arms, 50 vehicles of this type were still in service in 2024.

== Operators ==
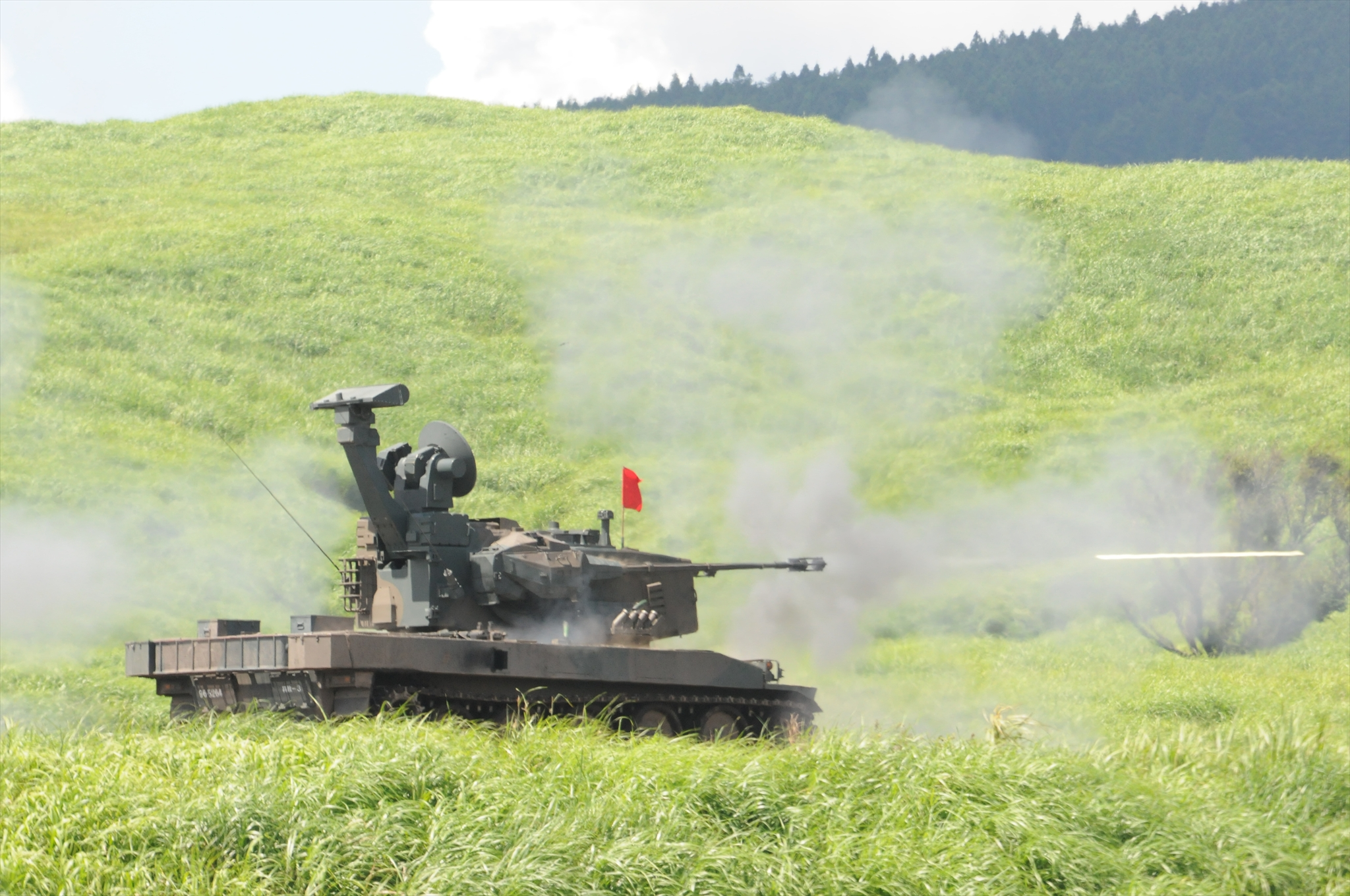
A Type 87 firing at ground targets during annual live fire exercises in the East Fuji Maneuver Area.

Japan

- Japan Ground Self-Defense Force
  - Northern Army
    - 2nd Division
      - 2nd Antiaircraft Artillery Battalion
        - 3rd Antiaircraft company (2 platoons: 8 vehicles)
    - 7th Division
      - 7th Antiaircraft Artillery Regiment
        - 1st Antiaircraft company(2 platoons: 8 vehicles)
        - 2nd Antiaircraft company (2 platoons: 8 vehicles)
        - 3rd Antiaircraft company (2 platoons: 8 vehicles)
        - 4th Antiaircraft company (2 platoons: 8 vehicles)
    - Air Defense School
      - Air Defense School Unit
        - 3rd Antiaircraft company (2 platoons: 8 vehicles)
    - Ordnance School (Camp Tutiura）

== Similar vehicles ==
- 2K22 Tunguska – (Soviet Union)
- Flakpanzer Gepard – (West Germany)
- Fliegerabwehrpanzer 68 – (Switzerland)
- Marksman anti-aircraft system – (United Kingdom)
- PZA Loara – (Poland)
