= Marksman anti-aircraft system =

Self-propelled anti-aircraft weapon

T-55AM Marksman
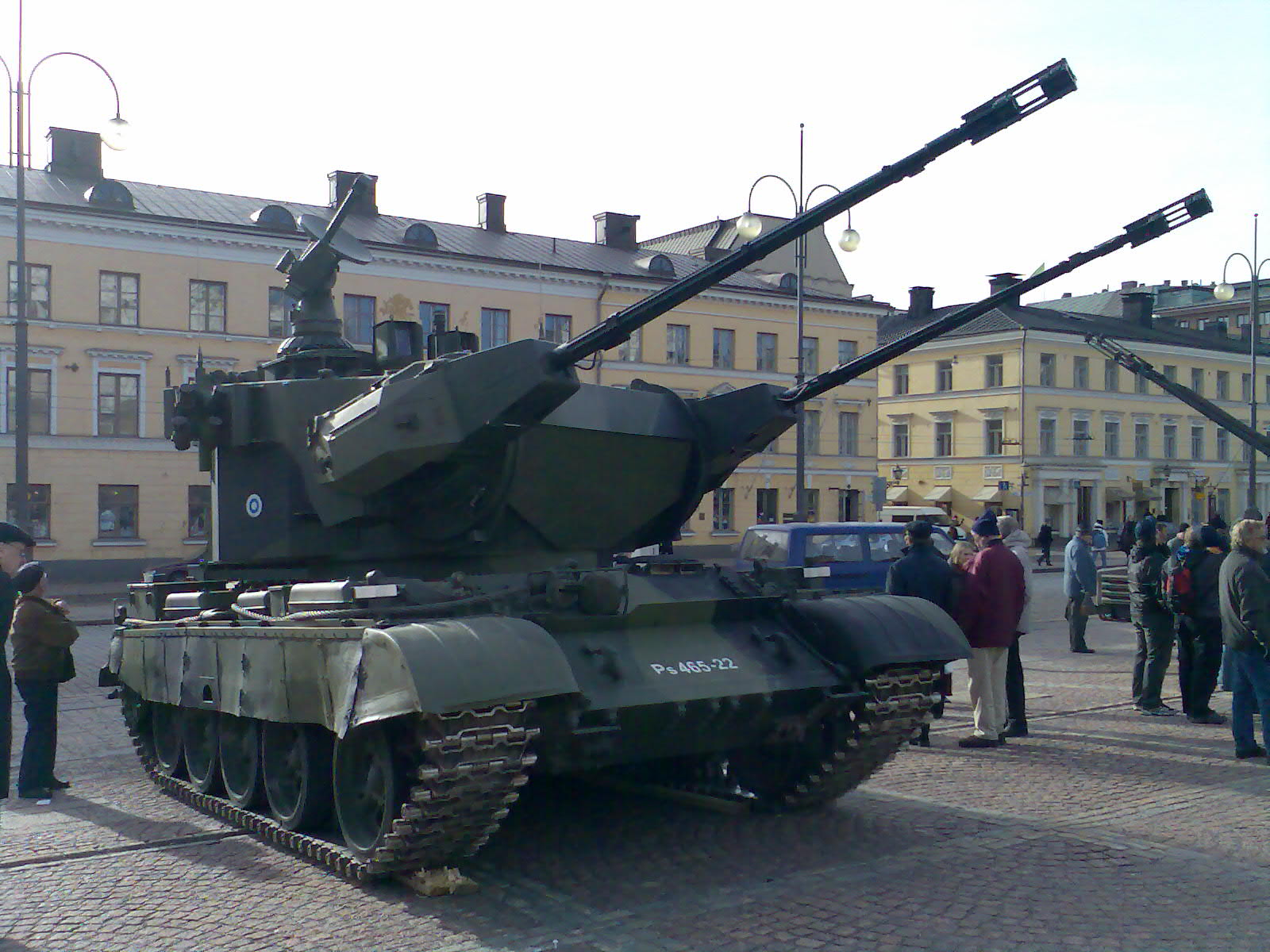
- Finnish ItPsv 90
- Type: SPAAG
- Place of origin: United Kingdom; Poland

Production history
- Manufacturer: Marconi Electronic Systems
- No. built: 7

Specifications
- Mass: 41 t
- Crew: 3 (driver, gunner, commander) + back-up crew
- Armor: turret: ballistic immunity from 14.5 mm heavy machine guns and 155 mm air bursts
- Main armament: 2 × 35 mm Oerlikon autocannon with 440 fragmentation rounds or anti-tank rounds
- Secondary armament: 8 × smoke grenade dischargers
- Engine: V-55 V-12 diesel engine 620 hp (462 kW)
- Suspension: Torsion bar

Leopard 2 Marksman
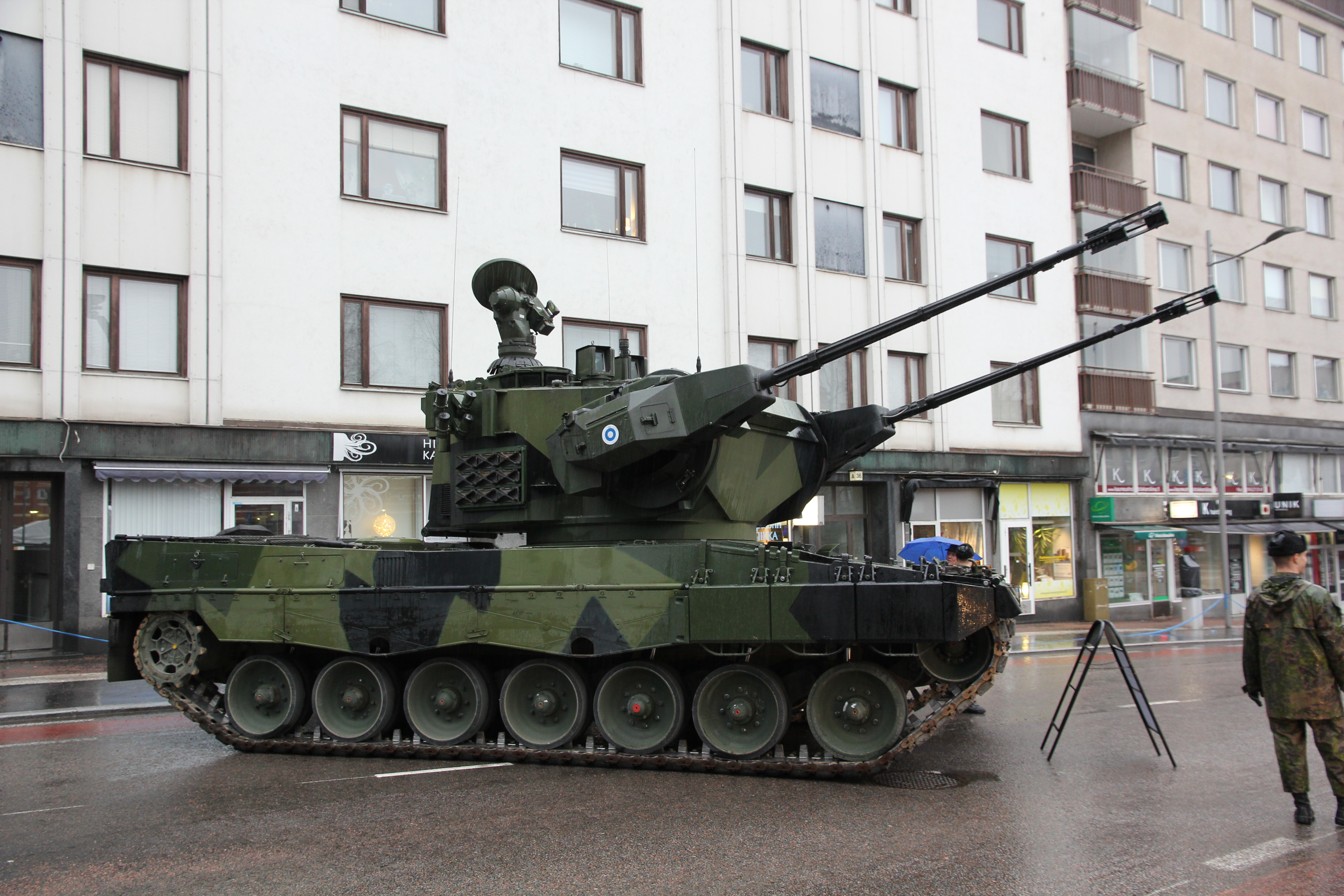
- Finnish Leopard 2 Marksman
- Type: SPAAG
- Place of origin: United Kingdom; Germany

Production history
- Manufacturer: Marconi Electronic Systems
- No. built: 7

Specifications
- Mass: 49 t
- Length: 9.30 m (guns forward)
- Width: 3.70 m
- Height: 4.82 m
- Engine: MTU MB 873 Ka-501 liquid-cooled V-12 Twin-turbo diesel engine 1,479 hp (1,103 kW) at 2,600 rpm
- Suspension: Torsion bar
- Operational range: 550 km (340 mi) (internal fuel)
- Maximum speed: 72 km/h (45 mph)

External images
- Marconi Marksman
- Marksman fitted to Vickers Mk 2 tank hull
- Fitting Marksman turret to Challenger hull

Marksman is a British short range air defense system developed by Marconi, consisting of a turret, a Marconi Series 400 radar and two Swiss Oerlikon 35 mm anti-aircraft autocannons. It is similar to the German Gepard system in terms of engine performance, ammunition carried and effective range of the ammunition.

The turret can be adapted to many basic tank chassis to create a self-propelled anti-aircraft gun. The only known major operator of the system to date is the Finnish Army, which ordered seven units in 1990. The turrets were fitted on Polish T-55AM tank chassis. The system is known as the ItPsv 90 in Finnish service (Ilmatorjuntapanssarivaunu 90, Anti-Aircraft tank 90, the number being the year the tank entered service). It is considered a very accurate anti-aircraft artillery system, having a documented hit percentage of 52.44%.

In 2010, the Marksman systems in service in Finland were moved to war-time storage. In 2015 work began to install the system on the Leopard 2A4 chassis in order to make up for the loss of mobile anti-aircraft coverage when the Marksman was originally retired.

The new Leopard 2 Marksman were produced in 2014 and 15 and started its service in 2016, under the designation ItPsv Leopard 2 (Ilmatorjuntapanssarivaunu Leopard 2, or anti-aircraft tank Leopard 2).

== Service ==
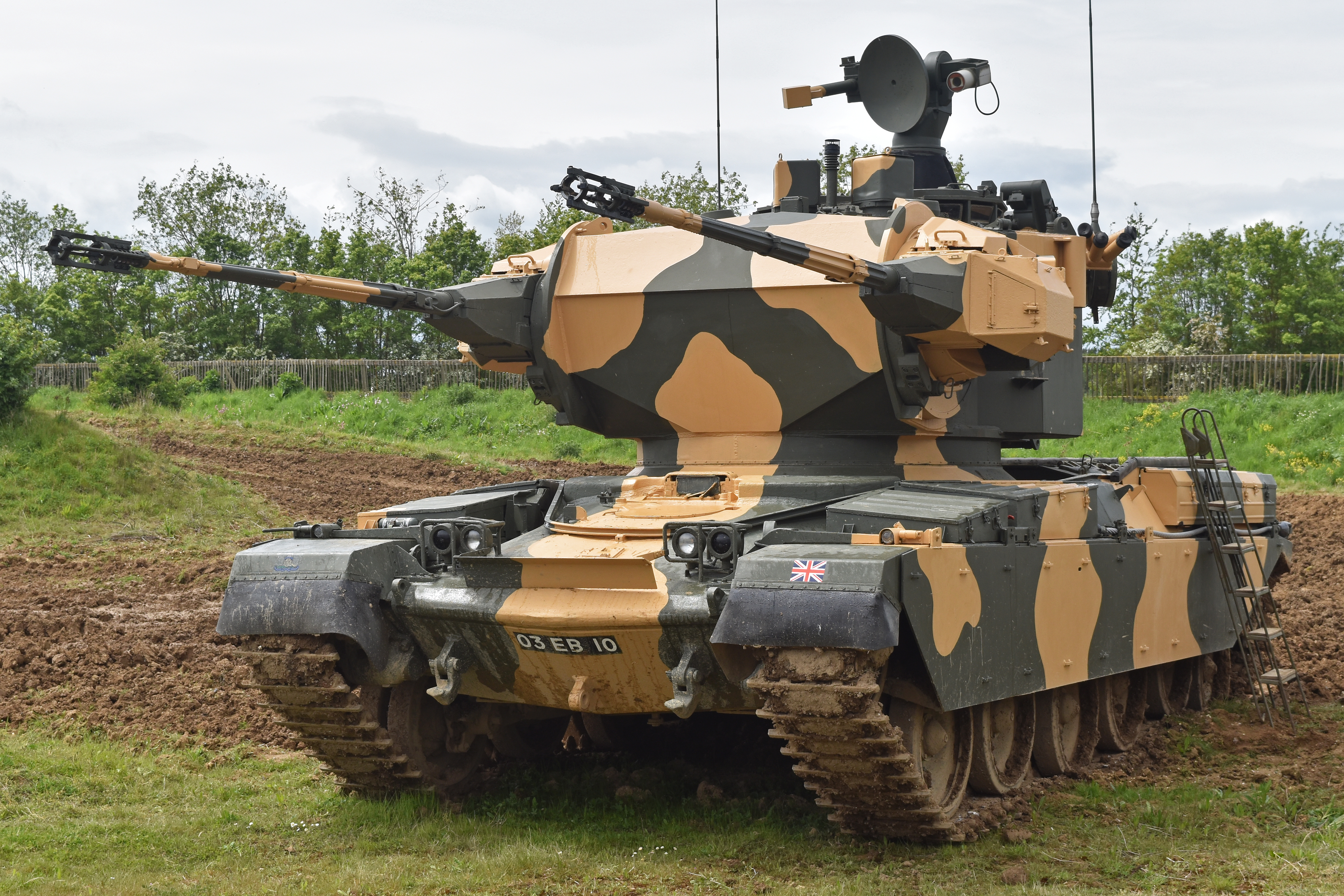
The only Chieftain tank chassis with this weapons system.

Finland has seven ItPsV 90 Marksman anti-aircraft systems, providing low-level air-defense for tank battalions. The SPAAGs are organically tied to the headquarters company and form teams of two. The vehicles have an all-day capacity, and there is also a back-up crew to ensure combat survivability. The ItPsv 90 Marksman is primarily meant to fight helicopters, low-flying aircraft and unmanned aerial vehicles (UAVs). It is also possible to engage surface and armored targets.

The chassis of the ItPsV 90 Marksman is a Polish T-55AM tank, which has been modified to fit the turret. The AM version was chosen due to the increased weight of the system (a T-55AM weighs 36 tons, while a T-55AM Marksman weighs 41 tons) and the AM has more power (620 hp) than a regular T-55. The weapon system is guided by a British Marconi 400 series frequency agile surveillance and tracking X/J-band radar, which is able to detect targets out to 12 kilometres (7.5 mi) in search mode and 10 kilometres (6.2 mi) in tracking mode. The laser distance measure device functions up to eight kilometres (5.0 mi). The commander and the gun operator both have gyro-stabilized optical aiming devices.

The armament consists of two Swiss 35 mm Oerlikon anti-aircraft guns, with a rate of fire of 18 rounds per second. The fragmentation round has a muzzle velocity of 1,175 metres per second (3,850 ft/s). The effective range is 4,000 metres (4,400 yd). The vehicle is also equipped with eight Wegmann 76 mm smoke dischargers, a 7.62 mm assault rifle, and a flare gun. The turret can traverse a full 360 degrees and has an elevation range of −10 to +85 degrees. The magazines hold 460 fragmentation rounds and 40 anti-tank rounds.

The new Leopard 2 chassis greatly improves mobility compared to the older T-55AM chassis, both on- and off-road. The Leopard 2 chassis is also larger, thus providing a more stable firing platform for the Marksman turret to operate from.

There are three communication radios in the vehicle for fire guidance and communications. The vehicle is operated by three crew members: commander, gunner, and driver.

== Versions ==
- ItPsv 90: a Marksman turret on a T-55AM chassis. Operated by Finland, retired in 2010.
- ItPsv Leopard 2: a Marksman turret on a Leopard 2A4 chassis. Finnish conversion from the earlier ItPsv 90 chassis.

In 1994, Marconi and South African Denel group announced plans to install a Marksman turret on a G6 howitzer chassis; Marconi also offered conversions for existing users of T-54/55, Type 59, Centurion, M48 Patton, Vickers, Chieftain, Challenger 1 and Leopard 1 tanks. None of these variants were picked up for deployment.

== Comparable systems ==
- Tunguska-M1 – (Soviet Union)
- ZSU-23-4 Shilka – (Soviet Union)
- Type 95 SPAAA – (China)
- Type 87 self-propelled anti-aircraft gun – (Japan)
- PZA Loara – (Poland)
- M247 Sergeant York – (United States)
- Flakpanzer Gepard – (West Germany)
- ZSU-57-2 – (Soviet Union)
- LAV-AD – (Canada)
- Luftvärnskanonvagn (lvkv) 9040 – (Sweden)
- Fliegerabwehrpanzer 68 – (Switzerland)
