= Oerlikon KCB =

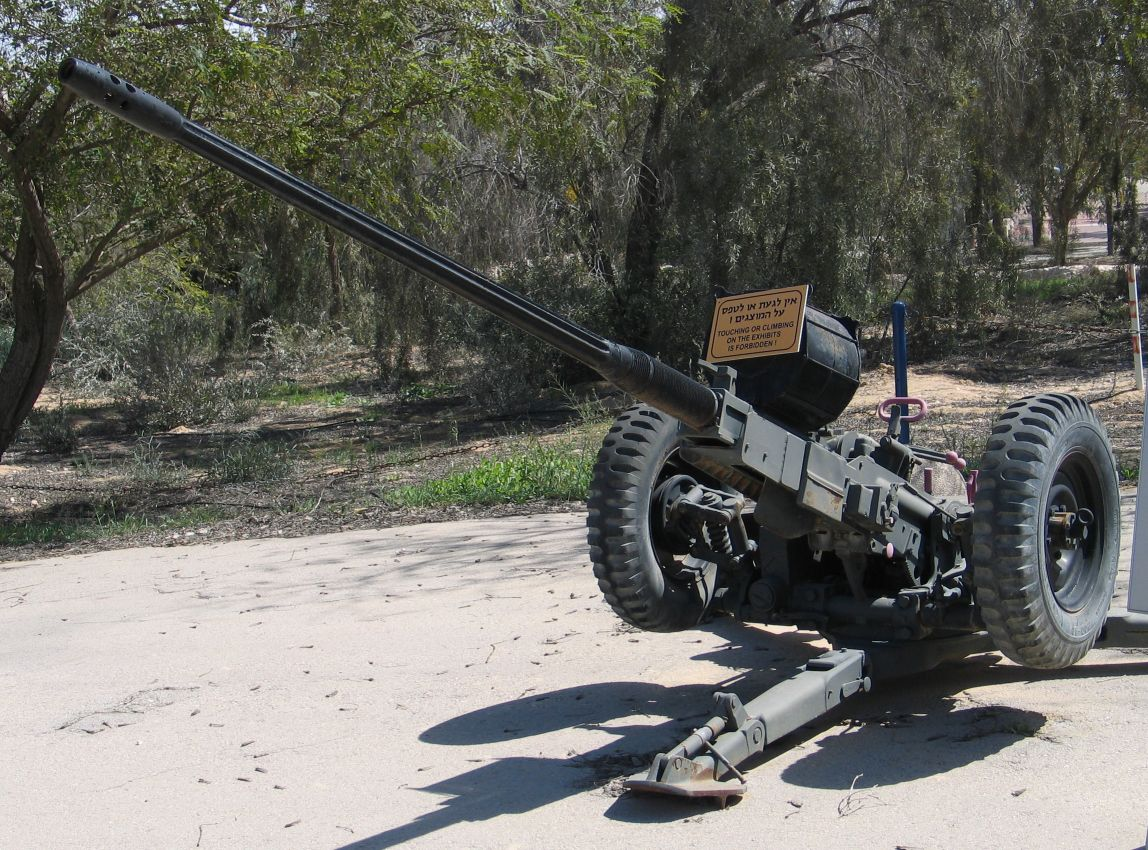
- HS.661 AA gun (early version with HS.831A autocannon).
- Type: Autocannon
- Place of origin: Switzerland

Service history
- In service: 1950s–Present

Production history
- Designer: Hispano-Suiza
- Designed: 1944–1950s
- Manufacturer: Hispano-Suiza; Oerlikon Contraves
- Developed from: Hispano-Suiza HS.820
- Produced: 1954–Present

Specifications
- Mass: HS.831A: 138 kg (304.24 lb); HS.831L: 138 kg (304.24 lb)
- Length: 3.524 m (11.56 ft)
- Barrel length: 2.56 m (8.40 ft) L/75
- Width: 218 mm (8.58 in)
- Shell: 30×170mm (steel case)
- Caliber: 30 mm (1.18 in)
- Action: Combined gas and blowback operation
- Rate of fire: HS.831A: 600 rounds/min; HS.831L: 650 rounds/min
- Muzzle velocity: HS.831A: 970 m/s (3,180 ft/s); HS.831L: 1,080 m/s (3,540 ft/s)
- Effective firing range: 3,000 m
- Feed system: Belt feed (either left or right hand feed), drum feed or 5-round stripper clips

The Oerlikon KCB is a 30 mm caliber autocannon, originally developed by Hispano-Suiza as the HS.831A. When Oerlikon purchased Hispano's armaments division in 1971, the HS.831L became the Oerlikon KCB.

== Development ==
The HS.831A is a post-war development of the HS.830 developed in 1944, which is a scaled-up version of the 20 mm HS.820 and has much the same general operating principles. Originally, the 30×170mm brass case round was developed, it was later changed to a steel case round.

The HS.831A was initially used in combination with the HS.661A, a single simple anti-aircraft gun mount, which was quickly supplemented by the HS.661B mount with much better fire control and smooth traverse, making maximum use of the 2.5 km (2,730 yd) practical range potential. The HS.831A was also mounted on the AMX-13 DCA 30, a self-propelled anti-aircraft weapon for the French Army, as well as the AMX-30 DCA (another self-propelled anti-aircraft weapon) for the Saudi Arabian Army.

In the United Kingdom, BMARC developed A32, a locally operated naval mounting incorporating two HS.831. When the gun was renamed KCB, the A32 became GCM-A series. And LSE (Laurence, Scott & Electricmotors Ltd; presently MSI Defence Systems) also developed a single mount for KCB, which became DS30B. Both GCM-A and DS30B were introduced by the Royal Navy. The 30 mm Rarden was developed based on the 30×170mm round that this gun used, but it wasn't interchangeable due to the KCB round using a steel case instead of a brass one.

The United States Navy designated the twin HS.831 weapons system developed by Emerson Electric as EX-74., which was officially classified as the Mark 74 gun mount. This mount was never used by the USN widely, but commercialized as the Emerlec 30 (or EE-30) and purchased by foreign navies (such as South Korean Navy, Nigerian Navy and Greek Navy).

== Variants ==
Gun variants

- HS.830 – Prototypes for testing purposes. Intended for use in aircraft.
- HS.831A – Early 1950's development for use in anti-aircraft mount.
- HS.831L – Improved (main production) model developed to meet Swiss requirements for a higher velocity anti-aircraft gun. Fires a slightly lighter projectile at higher velocity and higher cyclic rate of fire. Became part of the Oerlikon line-up as the Oerlikon KCB after Hispano-Suiza was acquired in 1971.

Mountings

- AMX-13 DCA 30 (Défense Contre Avions) – SPAAG using two HS.831A autocannons mounted on an AMX-13 chassis.
- AMX-30 DCA (Défense Contre Avions) – SPAAG using two HS.831A autocannons mounted on an AMX-30 chassis.
- Falcon – experimental SPAAG mounting two KCB on FV433 chassis. Not purchased.
- K30 Biho – only vehicle currently in service to mount the HS.831L.

== Gallery ==
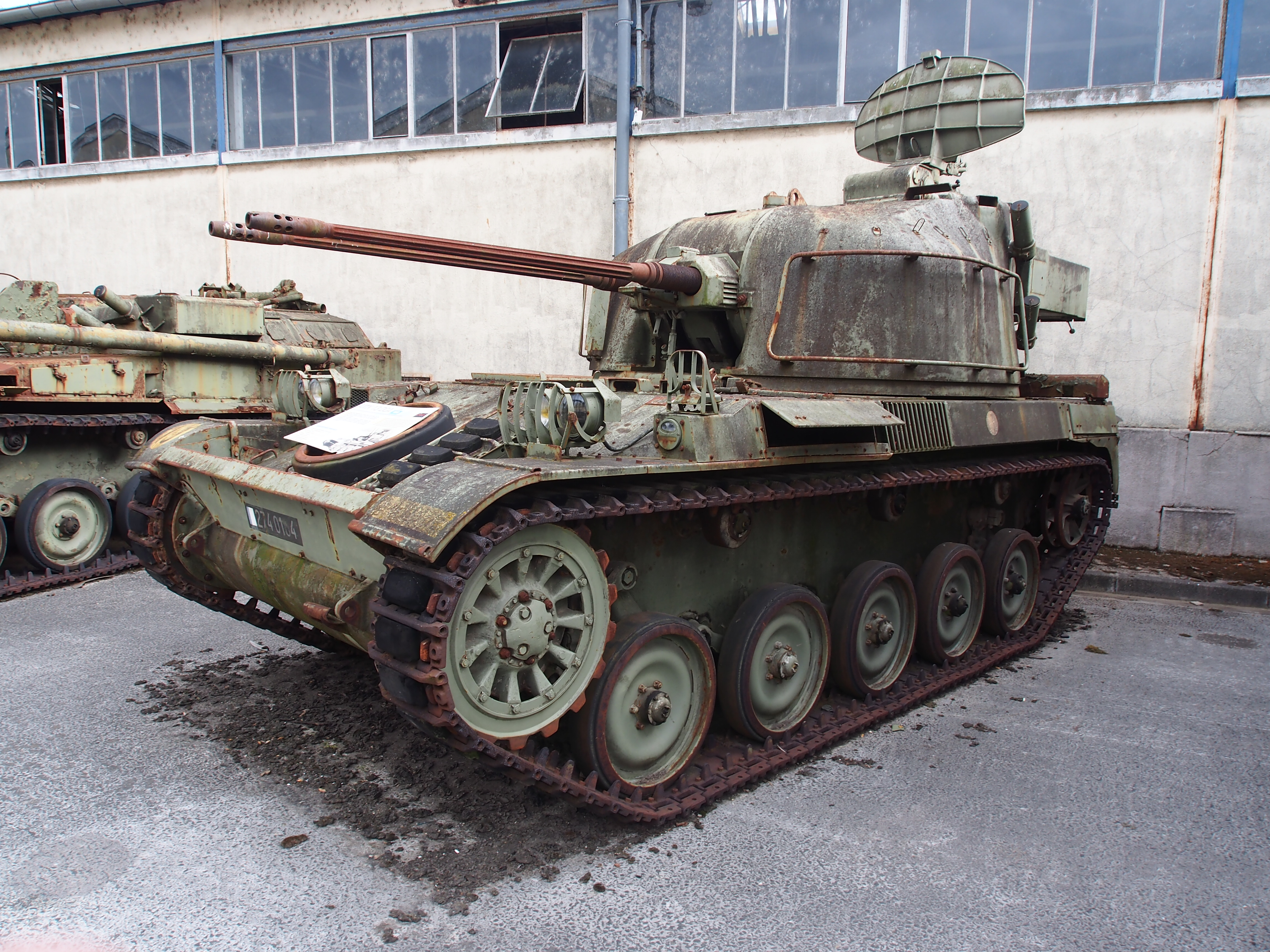
AMX-13 DCA on display at Musée des Blindés

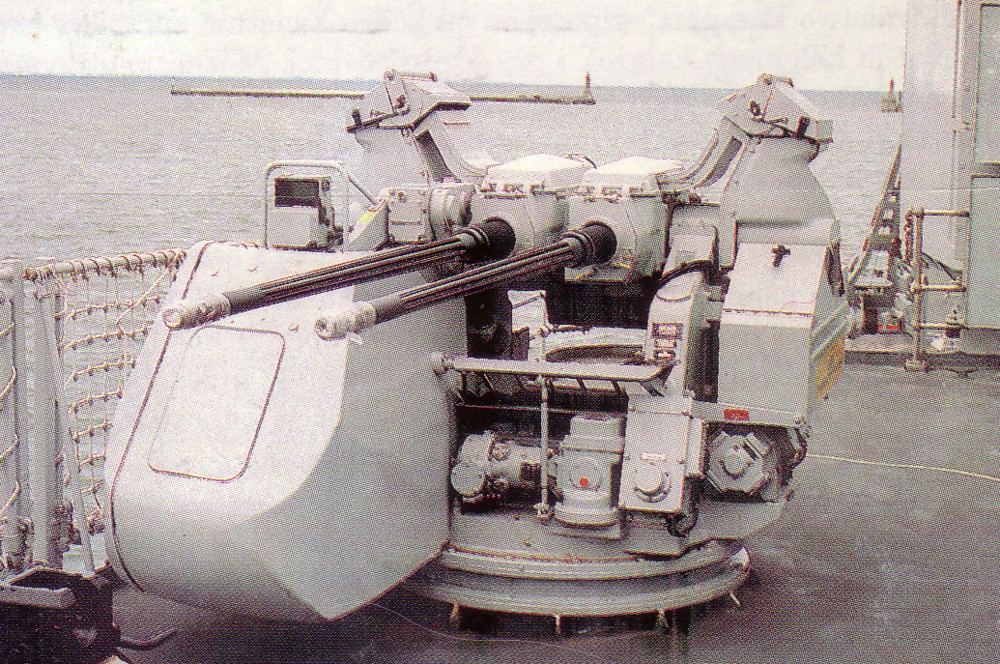
GCM-A on board HMS Battleaxe

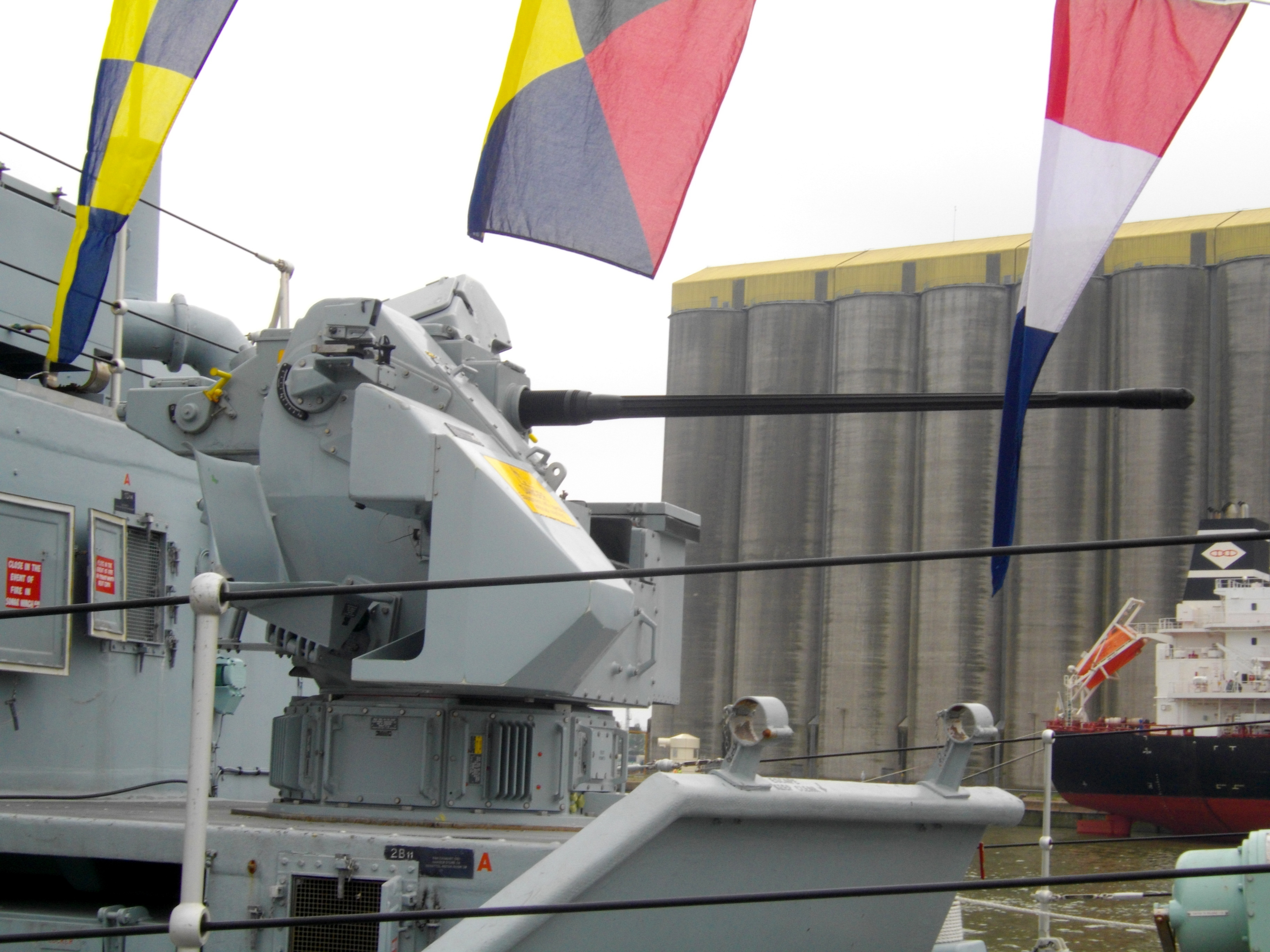
DS-30B on board HMS Blyth
