= Hanwha Aerospace =

South Korean defence company

Hanwha Aerospace Co., Ltd.
- Native name: 한화에어로스페이스 주식회사
- Formerly: Samsung Precision (1977–1987); Samsung Aerospace (1987–2000); Samsung Techwin (2000–2015); Hanwha Techwin (2015–2018)
- Type: Public
- Traded as: KRX: 012450
- Industry: Aerospace; Defense
- Founded: 1 August 1977; 49 years ago
- Headquarters: 86, Cheonggyecheon-ro, Jung-gu, Seoul, South Korea
- Area served: Worldwide
- Key people: Son Jae-il (CEO)
- Products: Aerospace parts; Lithium battery systems; Marine gas turbine engines; Military vehicles; Missiles; Rocket engines
- Revenue: ▲ ₩22.5475 trillion (2024)
- Operating income: ▲ ₩1.7319 trillion (2024)
- Net income: ▲ ₩2.5399 trillion (2024)
- Total assets: ▲ ₩43.3369 trillion (2024)
- Total equity: ▲ ₩11.3643 trillion (2024)
- Owner: Hanwha Group (33.99%); National Pension Service (7.56%); Treasury stocks (0.25%); Other (0.3%)
- Number of employees: 3,704 (2024)
- Parent: Hanwha Group
- Website: Official website in English; Official website in Korean

- Hanwha Aerospace
- Hangul: 한화에어로스페이스
- RR: Hanhwa eeoroseupeiseu
- MR: Hanhwa eŏrosŭp'eisŭ

Hanwha Aerospace Co., Ltd. (Korean: 한화에어로스페이스), formerly Hanwha Techwin Co Ltd, is a subsidiary of Hanwha Group, is an aerospace industrial company headquartered in Changwon, South Korea. It was established in 1977 as Samsung Precision. The company is Korea's only gas turbine engine manufacturer, and specializes in the development, production and maintenance of aircraft engines. In 1979, it started the aircraft engine business with gas turbine engine depot maintenance business, providing various gas turbines to Korea and all over the world and by 2016 the company had produced more than 8,000 pieces of equipment.

== History ==
=== Samsung Precision (1977) ===
Established in 1977 as Samsung Precision Industry, the company produced its first missile propulsion system in its first year of operation. In 1978, it established its first factory and precision machinery R&D institute in Changwon. In 1979, it began production of gas turbine engines for aircraft and started a joint venture with Minolta, Japan to produce cameras. After the completion of its second factory in Changwon in 1980, the company began producing aircraft components in 1981. In 1982, it achieved the first localization of aircraft components. In 1983, it acquired a part of the heavy equipment factory of Korea Heavy Industries, and produced a multi-joint assembly robot in 1984, followed by the establishment of Samsung United Airlines in a joint venture with Pratt & Whitney of the United States in 1985. In 1986, the company was selected as the major supplier of the Korean Fighter Program (KFP).

=== Samsung Aerospace Co., Ltd. (1987) ===
In February 1987, the company changed its name to Samsung Aerospace Co., Ltd. and established the Aerospace R&D Institute to begin developing helicopters. In the same year, it went public on the Korea Stock Exchange. In 1988, the company began its aviation transportation business and exported Samsung cameras to the United States for the first time. In 1989, it established its first overseas subsidiary in the United States. In 1991, it acquired an automated warehouse business from Samsung Electronics, and in 1993, it established the Gyeongnam Sacheon Plant to produce Lockheed Martin F-16 Fighter Jets under license in Korea. It even participated in the development of twin-engine composite material aircraft. In 1995, it acquired Union Optical Company headquartered in Japan, and Rollei GmbH & Co. KG headquartered in Germany, and launched its camera brand 'Kenox' in the following year. However, after the foreign exchange crisis in 1997, the company spun off its automation business to SFA in 1998, and transferred its aircraft business assets and rights, including the KF-16, to the “Korea Aerospace Industries, LTD. (KAI),” by means of the integration of domestic aircraft manufacturers led by the government in 1999. In the same year, it began mass-producing the K9 SPH (Self-Propelled Howitzer).

=== Samsung Techwin (2000) ===
Samsung Aerospace Co., Ltd., which had focused on the aircraft business, changed its name to Samsung Techwin after completely withdrawing from the aircraft manufacturing industry in March 2000. The company decided to concentrate on nurturing its semiconductor system and optical digital businesses and envisioned itself as a digital specialist.

In 2000, it mass-produced the world's first ultra-thin coated semiconductor components, and in 2002, it established sales subsidiaries in Germany and the U.K. In 2009, its camera business was spun off into a separate company called ‘Samsung Digital Imaging’. See the Samsung Camera section for more information.

=== Hanwha Techwin (2015) ===
In November 2014, Samsung Electronics Co., Ltd., the largest shareholder of Samsung Techwin, as well as Samsung C&T, Samsung SDI, Samsung Life Insurance, and Samsung Securities sold all shares of Samsung Techwin to Hanwha Corporation, and the company name was changed to Hanwha Techwin Co., Ltd. As Hanwha Corporation acquired Samsung Techwin (currently Hanwha Aerospace) and Samsung Thales (currently Hanwha Systems) in June 2015, Hanwha Group has comprehensively expanded its defense and electronics business from its Defense Division's precision-guided munitions to Hanwha Techwin's aircraft engines and ground equipment platform, such as self-propelled howitzers, as well as Hanwha Thales’ avionics and radars. The following year, in 2016, it acquired Doosan DST, the defense industry division of the Doosan Group, expanding its defense business to armored vehicles, air defense systems, and missile launch systems, and was newly launched as ‘Hanwha Defense (now Hanwha Aerospace)’.

=== Hanwha Aerospace (2018) ===
In April 2017, Hanwha Techwin split its Defense Division, Energy Equipment Division, and Industrial Equipment Division into three companies, Hanwha Land Systems Co., LTD., Hanwha Power Systems Co., LTD., and Hanwha Precision Machinery Co., Ltd., respectively. Then, in April 2018, Hanwha Techwin split its Security Segment and established a new privately held company called Hanwha Techwin, and changed the name of its subordinate corporation, the original Hanwha Techwin, to Hanwha Aerospace Co., Ltd.

In October 2018, Hanwha Aerospace acquired and incorporated aircraft propulsion, hydraulic, and fuel systems business from the Machinery Division of Hanwha Corporation, as well as the "Aviation Business," which includes aviation components such as landing gear from the Korean Fighter eXperimental (KFX) project.

In 2019, Hanwha Land Systems (currently Hanwha Aerospace), specializing in the K9 SPH (Self-Propelled Howitzer), absorbed its 100% subsidiary Hanwha Defense (currently Hanwha Aerospace) specialized in armored vehicles and launch systems such as K21 IFV (Infantry Fighting Vehicle) and K30 BIHO (Air Defense Gun & Missile System). In addition, it changed the subordinate corporation's name to ‘Hanwha Defense (currently Hanwha Aerospace)’, newly launching an integrated corporation.

In November 2022, Hanwha Aerospace absorbed its 100% subsidiary, Hanwha Defense, and it plans to merge and acquire the Defense Division of Hanwha Corporation as well. As a result, Hanwha Aerospace plans to strengthen its defense business portfolio from its existing aircraft engine and space business to Hanwha Defense's artillery systems, armored vehicles, air defense systems and unmanned ground systems, as well as ammunition and guided weapon systems of Hanwha Corporation's Defense Division. On the other hand, it will sell the affiliates mainly focusing on civilian business, Hanwha Power Systems and Hanwha Precision Machinery, to Hanwha Corporation.

On September 10, 2024, Hanwha Aerospace developed nonflammable batteries.

On July 7, 2026, Hanwha Aerospace unveiled prototypes of two domestically developed unmanned aircraft engines — a turbofan engine and a turboprop engine — developed with South Korea's Agency for Defense Development.

== Segments ==
The company operates its business through six segments. The Defense segment manufactures and sells self-propelled artillery, ammunition carriers, and provides comprehensive ground weapon system support. The Aviation Engine segment produces and supplies gas turbine engines and engine parts, and provides engine maintenance services.The Power Systems segment produces and sells compressors and power generation systems. The Security segment manufactures and sells closed circuit televisions (CCTVs), digital video recorders (DVRs) and others.The Industrial Equipment segment produces and sells surface mount technology equipment such as chip mounters and screen printers.The Information Technology (IT) Service segment is engaged in businesses such as design and construction of computer systems, and commissioned operation of computer systems.

== Business ==
With the merger of Hanwha Defense and Hanwha Corporation's defense division, the company is expanding its business from its existing focus on aerospace engines and space projects to cover the entire spectrum of defense industries, including space, aviation, land, sea, and air defense sectors.

=== Ground defense systems ===
Hanwha Aerospace develops and manufactures a wide range of ground systems, including firepower, maneuver, air defense, naval, and unmanned-manned integrated systems. In April 2023, the company acquired and merged with Hanwha Defense (formerly Hanwha Corporation’s Defense Division), leveraging advanced explosive technologies to expand into guided weapon systems, ammunition, laser technologies, and navigation systems.

==== Self-propelled howitzers and artillery ====
- K9 Thunder
- K10 ammunition resupply vehicle
- K77 fire command vehicle
- K55 self-propelled howitzer
- K56 ammunition transport vehicle
- K105A1 self-propelled howitzer (formerly the EVO-105)
- 120mm self-propelled mortar

==== Infantry fighting vehicles (IFVs) ====
- K21 infantry fighting vehicle
- K200 KIFV armored vehicle, which has several models including a NBCRV (Nuclear, Biological, Chemical Reconnaissance Vehicle) and 120mm self-propelled automatic mortar
- Barracuda armored vehicle, a "near copy" of the German TM-170
- Tigon armored vehicle

==== Anti-aircraft weaponry ====
- K30 Biho, a twin 30mm self-propelled anti-aircraft gun
- K31 Cheonma
- Nobong twin 40mm naval anti-aircraft cannon
- Vulcan cannon
- K30W Cheonho, an anti-aircraft vehicle that combines the K30 Biho's turret system with a K808 wheeled armored vehicle

== Subsidiaries ==
- Hanwha Land Systems
- Hanwha Power Systems
- Hanwha Precision Machinery
- Hanwha Techwin
- Hanwha Systems

== Corporate governance ==
=== Ownership ===
Major shareholders as of 2025
Shareholder	Country	Stake (%)
Hanwha Corporation	South Korea	33.99%
National Pension Service	South Korea	7.56%
Treasury Stocks	South Korea	0.25%
Other	South Korea	0.3%

== See also ==
- Defense industry of South Korea
- Arms industry
