= PZA Loara =

PZA Loara-A
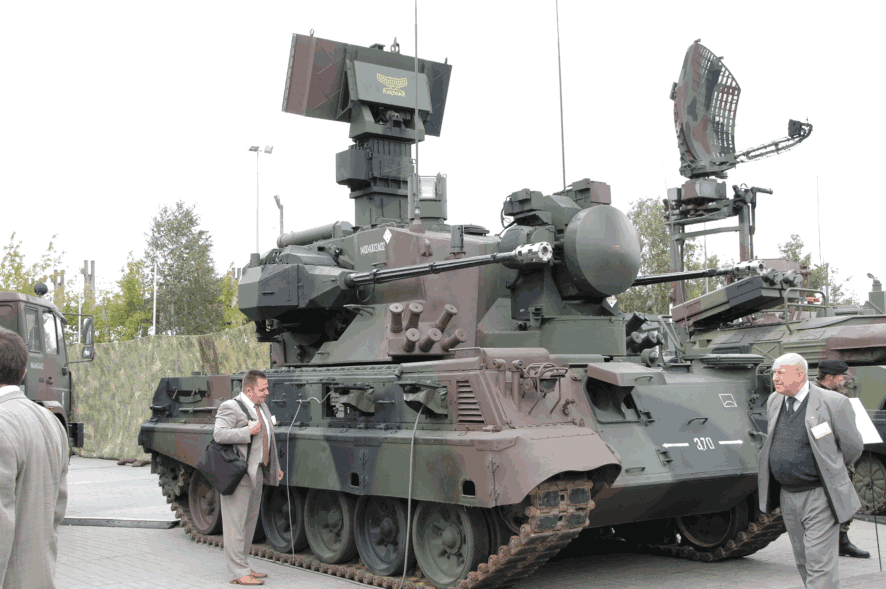
- The PZA Loara-A anti-aircraft vehicle
- Type: Self-propelled anti-aircraft gun
- Place of origin: Poland

Production history
- Unit cost: 60 million zł / ~$16 million
- No. built: 1 production unit; a few prototypes

Specifications
- Mass: 45 tonnes
- Length: 6.67 m (21 ft 11 in)
- Width: 3.4 m (11 ft 2 in)
- Height: 2.19 m (7 ft 2 in)
- Crew: 3 (commander, driver, gunner)
- Armor: conventional steel
- Main armament: 2 × 35×228mm Oerlikon KDA L/90 autocannon
- Secondary armament: none
- Engine: diesel S-1000; 1000 hp
- Power/weight: 20 hp/tonne
- Suspension: torsion bar
- Operational range: 650 km (400 mi)
- Maximum speed: 60 km/h (37 mph)

The PZA Loara (Polish: Przeciwlotniczy Zestaw Artyleryjski 'anti-aircraft artillery system') is a Polish armoured radar-directed self-propelled anti-aircraft gun system.

== See also ==
- Flakpanzer Gepard – (West Germany)
- Marksman – (United Kingdom)
- K30 Biho – (South Korea)
- Type 87 – (Japan)
- 9K22 Tunguska – (Soviet Union)
