= Fliegerabwehrpanzer 68 =

35 mm anti aircraft tank B22L
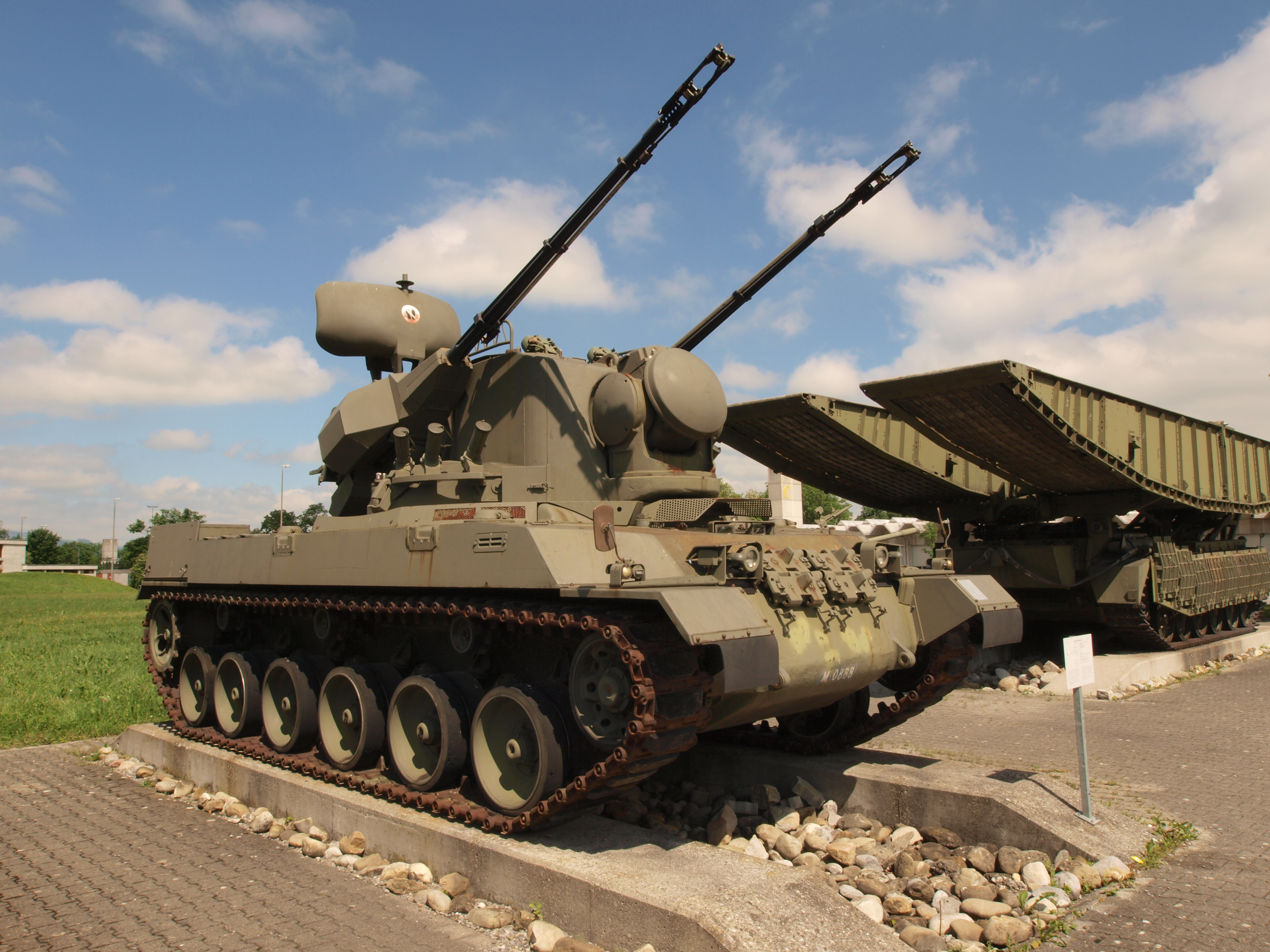
- Panzer 35 mm anti aircraft tank B22L
- Type: Self-propelled anti-aircraft gun
- Place of origin: Switzerland

Service history
- In service: 1979 - 1980
- Used by: Switzerland

Production history
- Designed: 1977
- Manufacturer: Eidgenössische Konstruktionswerkstätte Thun Contraves AG Oerlikon-Buehrle and Siemens
- Produced: 1979
- No. built: 2

Specifications
- Mass: 46 tonnes
- Length: 7.48 m (24 ft 6 in)
- Width: 3.33 m (10 ft 11 in)
- Height: 4.30 m (14 ft 1 in), radar folded:3.14 m (10 ft 4 in)
- Crew: 3
- Armour: up to 120 mm RHA
- Main armament: 2× 35 mm Mk Oerlikon Gas operated guns, 620 rounds FlaK-Ammunition + 40 rounds Erdziel (Ground target)-Ammunition
- Secondary armament: 6 51 8 cm, 12 Smoke Cartridges 51
- Engine: MTU MB 837 Ba-500 V-8 diesel engine auxiliary motor 4 cylinder engine Mercedes Benz OM 636; 660 hp (490 kW), 38 hp (28 kW)
- Suspension: Torsion bar
- Ground clearance: 400 mm
- Maximum speed: 52 km/h (32 mph) , off-road:30 km/h (19 mph)

Fliegerabwehrpanzer 68 was a Swiss self-propelled anti-aircraft gun which was tested but did not enter service.

== History and development ==
In 1977, a project of Contraves AG Oerlikon-Buehrle, Eidgenoessische Konstruktionswerkstaette and Siemens was presented for an air defense shield. In 1979, the construction of two prototypes was decided in collaboration with the K + W Thun. 1979 saw the delivery of the prototypes to the Group on Arms Services. From 1979 to 1980, the vehicles were subjected to rigorous testing, but the project was cancelled in favor of the Rapier missile. The actual weapon system formed the FlaK-Turm ("Flak turret"), which came from the German Flakpanzer Gepard based on the chassis of the Panzer 68 widened by 180 mm. It mainly included the homing radar, tracking radar, the fire control with computers and the twin 35-mm weapons.

The crew consisted of the commander, the gunner and the driver. The target search radar allowed a continuous and reliable air surveillance and Identification friend or foe while in motion. The target tracking radar detected and tracked an assigned air target automatically in lateral and vertical angle and at a distance. The analog computer calculated the deflection angle for the guns, taking account of the daily influences, the continuously measured values Vo and the tilting of the vehicle. The main armament consisted of two 35-mm guns with ammunition feed and the ammunition boxes.

Two vehicles, with the M numbers M0888 and M0889, were used for testing in troop deployment from 1979 to 1980. A vehicle is on display at the Tank Museum in Thun.
