= K200 KIFV =

Armored personnel carrier

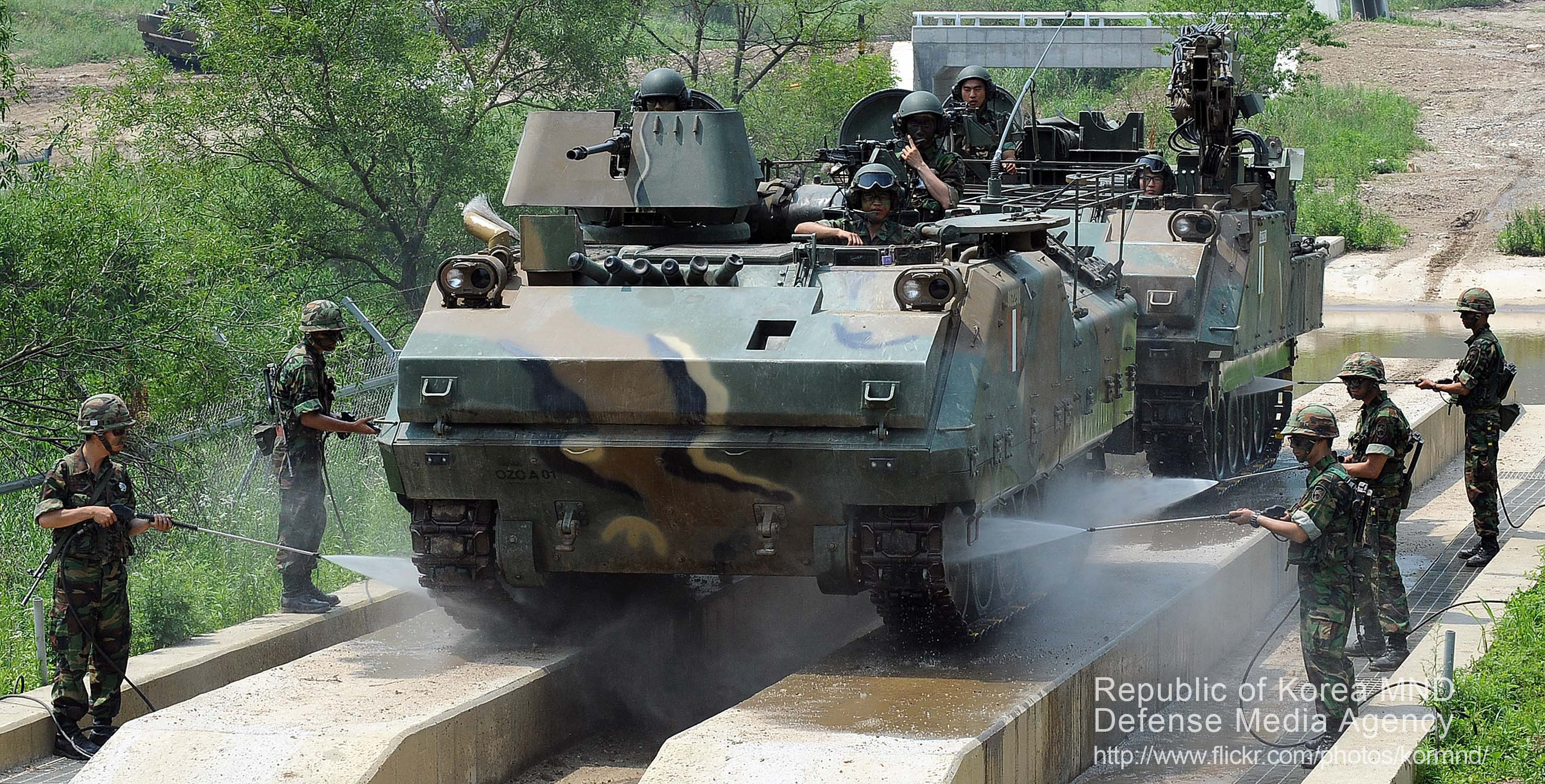
- K200A1 KIFV of Republic of Korea Armed Forces
- Type: Armored personnel carrier
- Place of origin: South Korea

Service history
- In service: 1985–present
- Used by: See Operators
- Wars: Yugoslav Wars; 1999 East Timorese crisis; Iraq War; Haitian conflict

Production history
- Designer: Agency for Defense Development; Daewoo Heavy Industries
- Designed: 1980–1984
- Manufacturer: Daewoo Heavy Industries (1984–2000); Daewoo Heavy Industries & Machinery (2000–2005); Doosan Infracore (2005–2009); Doosan DST (2009–2016); Hanwha Techwin (2016–2017); Hanwha Land Systems (2017–2019); Hanwha Defense (2019–2022); Hanwha Aerospace (2022–present)
- Unit cost: $1.41 million (domestic) $1.32 million (export)
- Produced: K200: 1984–1996; K200A1: 1994–present
- No. built: 2,500 (estimate)

Specifications
- Mass: 13.2 tons
- Length: 5.49 m
- Width: 2.85 m
- Height: 2.52 m
- Crew: 3 + 9 passengers
- Armor: Aluminium alloy
- Main armament: 1 x M2 machine gun
- Secondary armament: 1 x M60 or K12 machine gun
- Engine: K200: Daewoo/MAN D2848M 280 hp A1: Daewoo/MAN D2848T 350 hp (261 kw) at 2,300 rpm
- Power/weight: 26.5 hp/ton
- Transmission: K200: David Brown T300; 7 forward, 7 reverse A1: Allison Transmission X200-5D (early) or X200-5K (late); 4 forward, 1 reverse
- Suspension: torsion bar
- Operational range: 480 km
- Maximum speed: 70 km/h 6 km/h on water

The K200 KIFV ("Korean Infantry Fighting Vehicle") is a South Korean armored personnel carrier designed by the Agency for Defense Development through Project Toad (두꺼비 사업) to replace older armored personnel carriers, such as the M113. It was produced by Hanwha Aerospace (then, Daewoo Heavy Industries). Since 2009, the K200 has been supplemented by the K21. An estimated 2,500 K200/A1 series were built (1700 standard, 800 specialized), among which 111 were exported to Malaysia.

== History ==
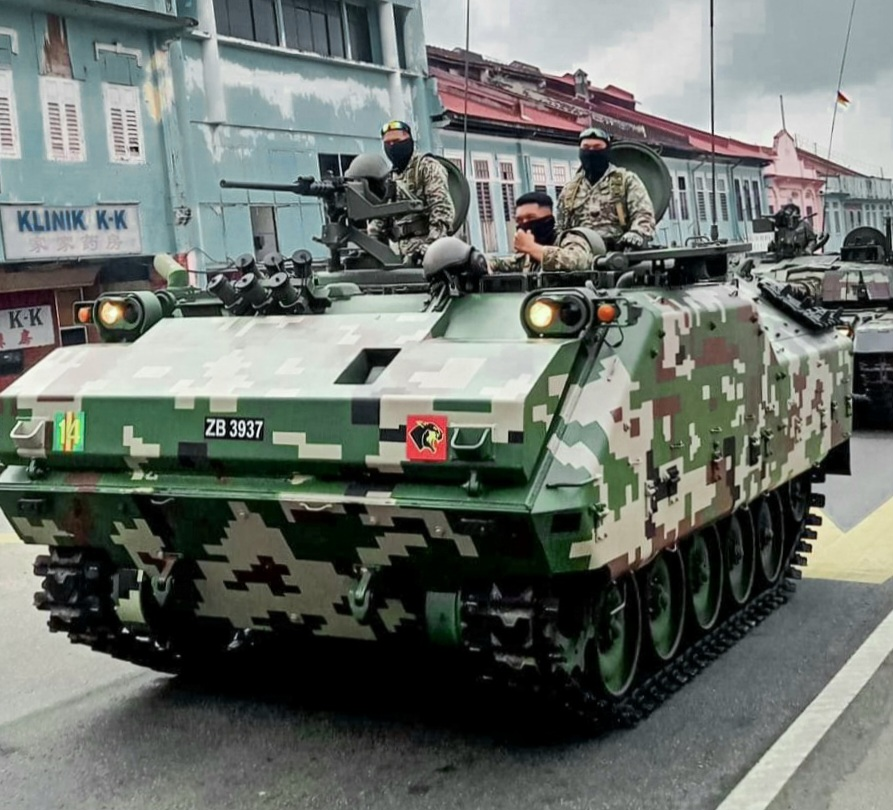
K200A1 KIFV of Malaysian Army in digital camouflage

The K200 project began in 1981 when the Republic of Korea Army issued a request for a new Korean Infantry Fighting Vehicle (KIFV) to meet future combat requirements. The Agency for Defense Development was in charge of its development, and Daewoo Heavy Industries was the prime contractor for the production of this vehicle. The K200 was designed to be an amphibious personnel carrier that could cross shallow rivers. The vehicle was developed to be more affordable than the AIFV, but not necessarily sacrificing capability, to gain an edge in cost-effectiveness. The eventual domestic development and production of the K200 achieved a price range of US$1.32-1.41 million as opposed to the $1.52-2.83 million price range that a license-production or direct importation of the AIFV would have entailed.

Doosan incorporated the MAN D2848T engine into the K200 under a license-production deal and assimilated its technology using domestic components, a reverse-engineering experience that would prove instrumental in the development of its next IFV, the K21. S&T Dynamics was the licensee subcontractor for the Allison Transmission X200-5K gearbox. The vehicle entered production in 1985. Serial production was completed in 2006.

In October 2017, Hanwha unveiled an internally-funded upgrade project that would turn the K200 into a modular, multi-purpose vehicle. The redesign involved stretching the chassis and adding a road wheel for six pairs and removing the back section to create a flat cargo bed to fit various modules that can be swapped out for different missions; initial configurations included ambulance, fuel tanker, minelayer, and communications modules. With ROK Army approval, the company developed the project in two years.

== General characteristics ==
The K200 series of vehicles transport mechanized infantry platoon is designed to keep personnel safe from small arms fire. The hull of the KIFV is of all-welded aluminium armor with an additional layer of spaced laminate steel armor bolted to it. The composite armor provides a higher level of protection for less weight. It provides protection against 12.7 mm rounds on the sides, 7.62 mm ammunition in the rear, larger shell splinter from the ground, and anti-personnel mines. The engine compartment is located at the front right of the vehicle and is separated from the remainder of the vehicle by a bulkhead. The engine compartment is fitted with a fire extinguishing system that can be operated by the driver or from outside the vehicle. The air inlet, air outlet louvers and the exhaust pipe are located on the roof of the vehicle to allow amphibious operations.

The K200 has six electrically operated smoke grenade launchers mounted across the front of the hull as countermeasures against electro-optical and infrared targeting. If the KIFV variant features a turret, the smoke grenade launchers mount on the turret (three on each side).

K200 can provide infantry firepower support with 12.7 mm and 7.62 mm machine guns. Stronger anti-infantry and anti-material firepower can be brought to bear by equipping a 20 mm Vulcan gun, or 81 mm and 107 mm mortars. Anti-tank capability can be added by equipping the Metis-M anti-tank missile system. The K200 is highly modular, and its variants provide additional types of combat support such as air defense and vehicle recovery using specialized equipment. The APC can accommodate 12 people including one infantry squad, the driver, and gunners.

In November 2015, Doosan and CMI Defence revealed they had cooperated to create the Cockerill Protected Weapon Station (CPWS) to increase the firepower of the K200. The turret can support cannons between 20 and 30 mm, plus a 7.62 mm coaxial machine gun, including the: CPWS20 20 mm; CPWS 25 mm which can be armed with the M242 Bushmaster, Nexter M811, or Oerlikon KBA; and CPWS30 armed with the M230LF.

=== K200A2 ===
On 7 January 2025, DAPA announced the completion of standardization of K200A2, K242A2, K277A2, K281A2, and K288A2. The agency installed front and rear cameras and integrated mechanical devices distributed in the vehicle to enhance convenience. It also updated various defense specifications for each armored vehicle. The ministry plans to conduct upgrades during overhaul for 1,100 vehicles by 2031.

== Variants ==
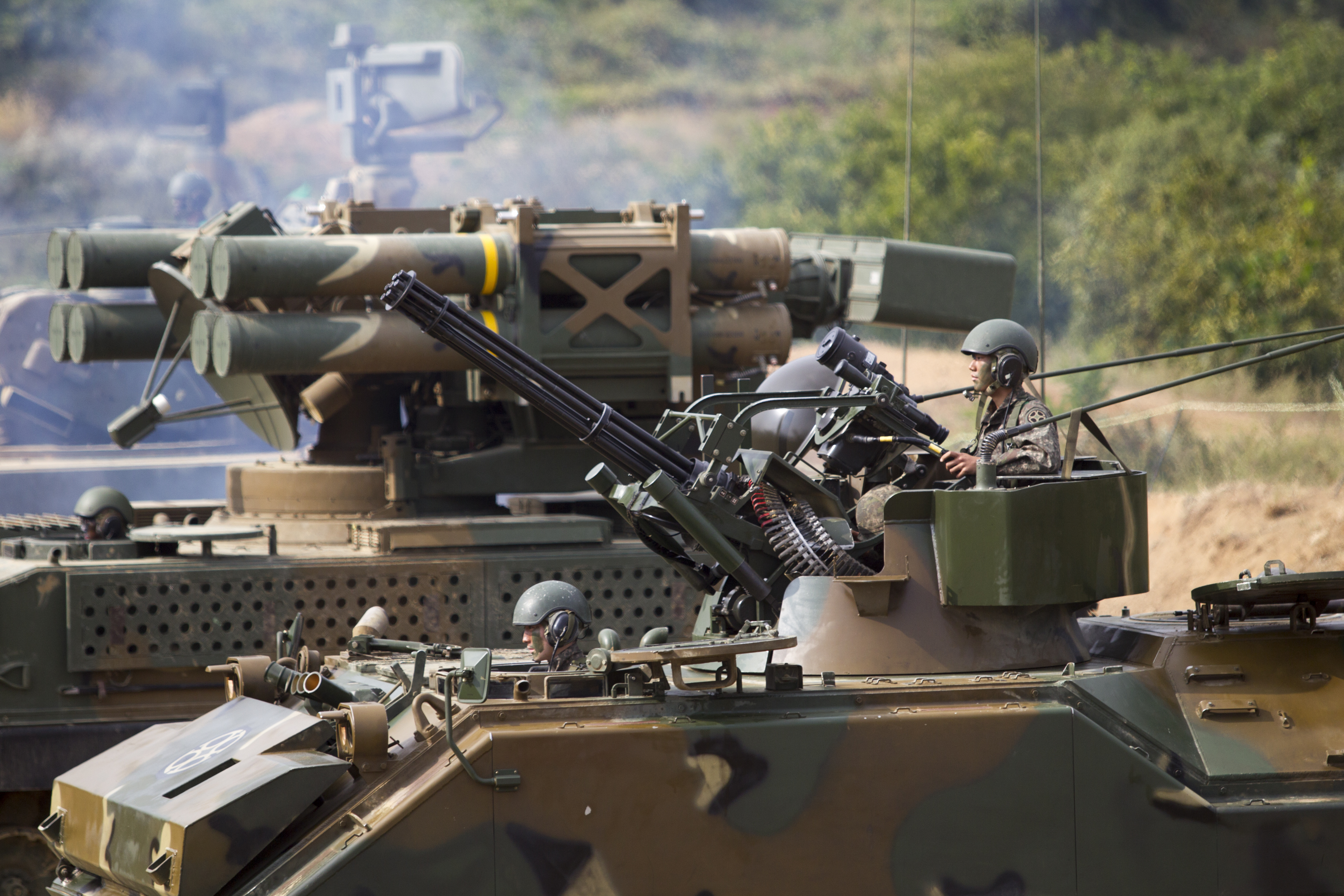
K263 SPAAG variant in Republic of Korea Armed Forces service

- K200: First production variant.
  - K216: NBC reconnaissance vehicle. Equipped with detection system to trace sources of NBC agents.
  - K221: Smoke generating vehicle. Produces two types of smoke to protect from visible light for 90 minutes and infrared for 30 minutes.
  - K242: Carries 4.2 inch mortar for fire support.
  - K255: Proposed ammunition resupply vehicle for 155 mm self-propelled howitzer.
  - K263 SPAAG: KM167A1 20 mm self-propelled anti-aircraft gun variant of K200.
  - K277: Command post vehicle. The vehicle contains various supplements for commanders.
  - K281: Carries 81 mm mortar for fire support.
  - K288: Recovery vehicle. Rescues and repairs damaged military vehicles.
- K200A1: Upgraded variant of the base K200 with more powerful engines and transmission. The upgrade also added NBC protection and automatic fire extinguishing system.
  - K242A1: Carries 4.2 inch mortar for fire support. To be replaced by 120 mm mortar.
  - K263A1 SPAAG: KM167A1 20 mm M61 Vulcan self-propelled anti-aircraft gun variant of K200A1.
  - K277A1: Command post vehicle variant of the K200A1.
  - K281A1: Carries 81 mm mortar for fire support.
  - K288A1: Recovery vehicle. Rescues and repairs damaged military vehicles.

== Operators ==
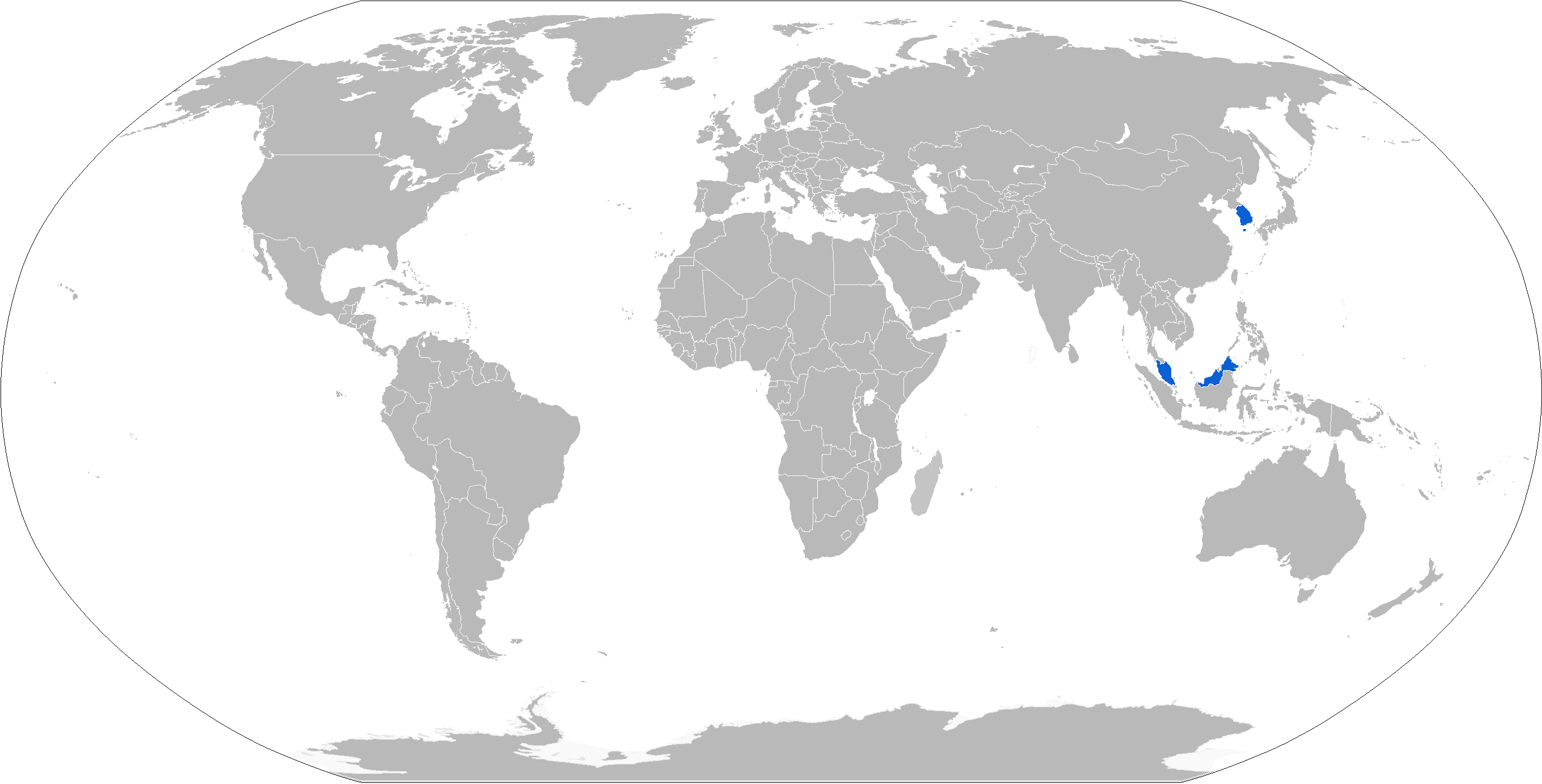
Map with K200 operators in blue

- Haiti - Received 3 K200A1s on February 5, 2026 for use by Haitian National Police against the gangs.
- Malaysia - Received 111 K200s between 1993 and 1995. All vehicles were upgraded to K200A1s between 2000 and 2008.
  - 1993 order: 32 K200s, 2 K277s, 4 K281s, 2 K288s 2 K200 ambulances. 1994 order: 18 K200s, 2 K277s, 1 K288, 1 K200 ambulance. 1995 order: 47 K200s and variants.
  - In 2000, Daewoo proposed A1 upgrade, and a sample was built at the Number 91 Workshop of the Malaysian Army. Malaysia upgraded 56 vehicles between 2001 and 2002, 32 vehicles between 2004 and 2005, and 22 vehicles between 2006 and 2008.
  - Malaysia planned for second upgrades in 2024. The upgraded vehicle includes added protection, RCWS, optical sensors, enhanced communication, and others.
- South Korea

=== Future operators ===
- Thailand - On 27 August 2024, Hanwha Aerospace and Thai Defence Industry (TDI) under the Defence Technology Institute (DTI) signed a MOU for K200A2 upgrades. Under the MOU, Hanwha will be partnering with Chaiseri Metal and Rubber for upgrading after Thailand acquire used K200s.

== See also ==
- AIFV
- Egyptian Infantry Fighting Vehicle
- FNSS ACV-15 - Turkish built version of the AIFV
