= Ulyanovsk Mechanical Plant =

Coordinates: 54°18.49′N 48°20.60′E

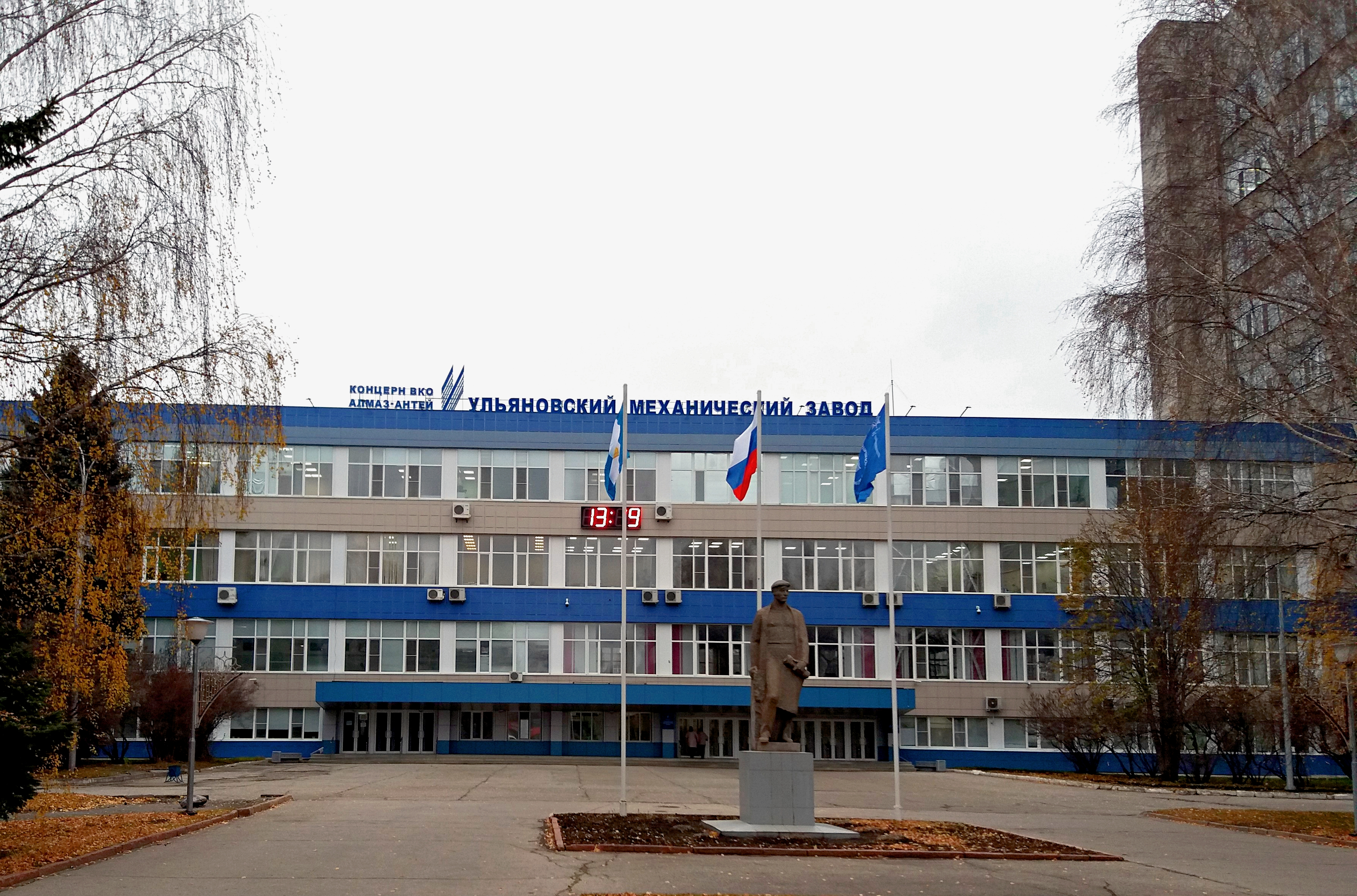
- UMZ plant in 2021
- Type: Joint-stock company
- Industry: Defense industry
- Founded: 1966
- Headquarters: Ulyanovsk, Russia
- Products: Anti-aircraft defence systems, missiles, autocannons, ammunition
- Revenue: $526 million (2014)
- Parent: Almaz-Antey
- Website: www.ump.mv.ru

JSC Ulyanovsk Mechanical Plant or UMP for short (translit. Ulyanovsk Mekhanicheskiy Zavod, UMZ) is a Soviet/Russian military enterprise, now part of Almaz-Antey holding. Founded on 1 January 1966, by decree of the Soviet government. Located in the city of Ulyanovsk, Russia next to UAZ.

== Products ==
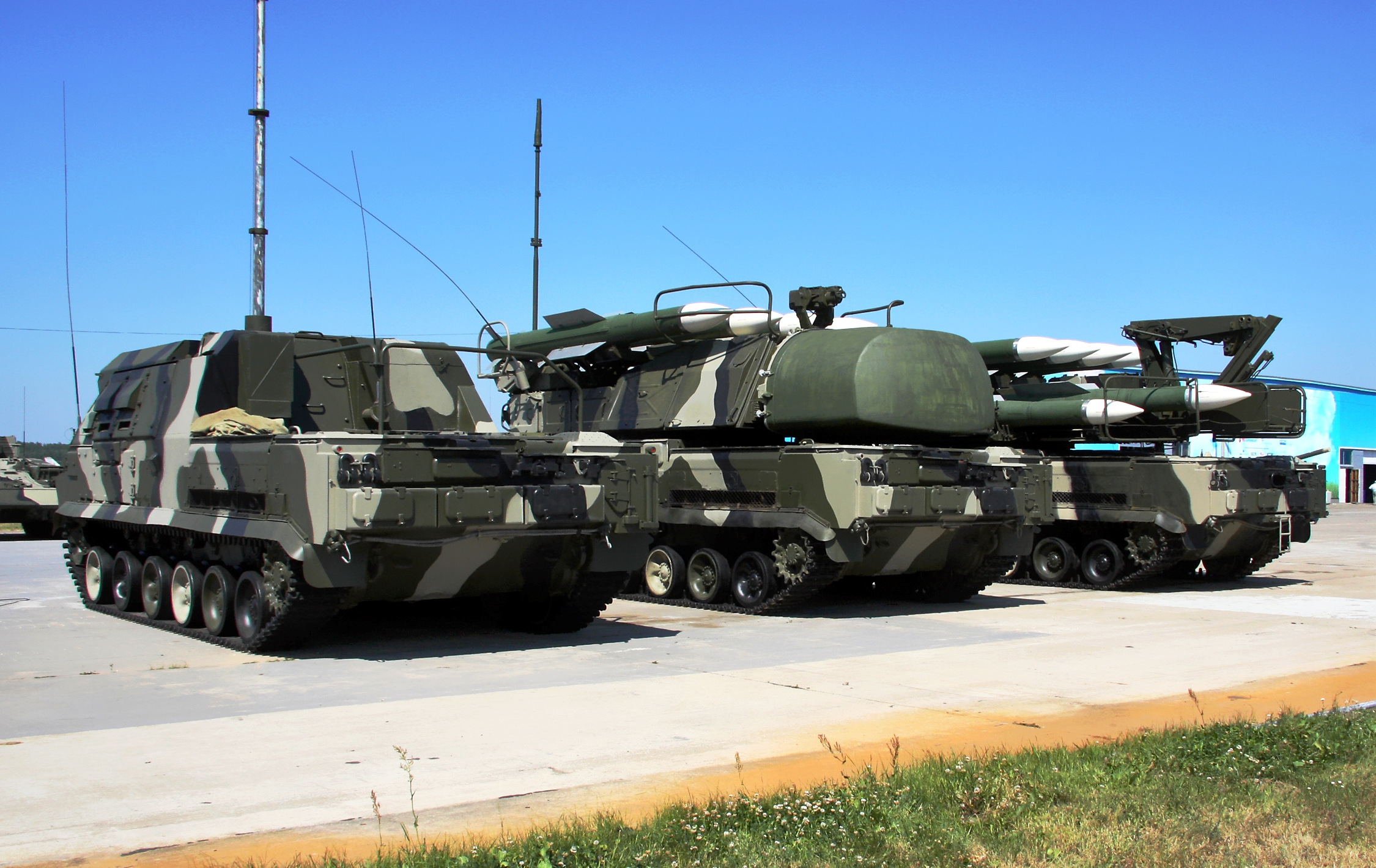
Medium range SAM system "Buk"

UMZ settled to mass production of:

- ZSU Shilka 1964-1982
- 2K12 Kub (also an export version under the name Kvadrat) 1968-1985
- 9K37 Buk since 1980
- 9K22 Tunguska since 1981
- Pantsir complex radiotechnics system since 1988
- Orion, Ohota complex radiotechnics system since 2000
- a set of civilian products
