= 2K22 Tunguska =

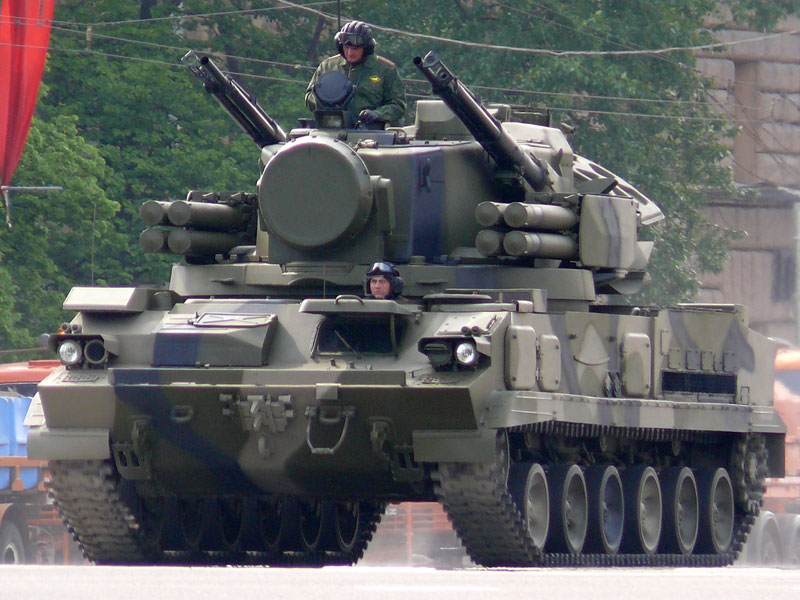
- 2K22M "Tunguska-M" Gun/Missile Air Defense System.
- Type: Tracked self-propelled anti-aircraft gun
- Place of origin: Soviet Union

Service history
- In service: 1982–present
- Used by: See Operators
- Wars: Russo-Georgian War; Russo-Ukrainian war

Production history
- Designer: KBP Instrument Design Bureau
- Designed: 1970–1980
- Manufacturer: Ulyanovsk Mechanical Factory
- Unit cost: $16 million
- Produced: 1976–present
- Variants: 2K22 (Tunguska), 2K22M (Tunguska-M), 2K22M1 (Tunguska-M1)

Specifications (Tunguska-M1)
- Mass: about 35,000 kg (77,000 lb)
- Length: about 7.90 m (25 ft 11 in)
- Width: about 3.25 m (10 ft 8 in)
- Height: about 4 m (13 ft 1 in) or about 3.35 m (10 ft) (radar stowed)
- Crew: 4 (vehicle commander, driver, gunner, radar operator)
- Armour: protects the vehicle from 7.62 mm small arms fire and shell splinters
- Main armament: 8 × 9M311, 9M311K, 9M311-1, 9M311M, 9M311-M1 or 57E6 missiles
- Secondary armament: 2 × twin-barrel 30 mm 2А38M guns (1,904 rounds carried)
- Engine: V-46 based on the Model V-2 V12 diesel engine the engine had 780hp, but it was limited to 710hp for this vehicle
- Transmission: Hydromechanical
- Suspension: Hydropneumatic
- Ground clearance: 17–57 cm
- Operational range: 500 km (310 mi)
- Maximum speed: 65 km/h (40 mph) maximum on the road

The 2K22 Tunguska (Russian: Тунгуска) is a Soviet tracked self-propelled anti-aircraft gun armed with a surface-to-air gun and missile system. It is designed to provide day and night protection for infantry and tank regiments against low-flying aircraft, helicopters, and cruise missiles in all weather conditions. The NATO reporting name for the missile used by the weapon system is SA-19 "Grison".

== Development ==
Development of the 2K22 anti-aircraft system began on 8 June 1970. At the request of the Soviet Ministry of Defense, the KBP Instrument Design Bureau in Tula, under the guidance of the appointed Chief Designer A. G. Shipunov, started work on a 30mm anti-aircraft system as a replacement for the 23mm ZSU-23-4.

The project, code-named "Tunguska", was undertaken to improve on the observed shortcomings of the ZSU-23-4 (short range and no early warning) and a counter to new ground attack aircraft in development, such as the A-10 Thunderbolt II and the AH-64 Apache, which were designed to be highly resistant to 23 mm cannons. Studies were conducted and demonstrated that a 30 mm cannon would require from a third to a half of the number of shells that the 23 mm cannon of the ZSU-23-4 would need to destroy a given target, and that firing at a MiG-17 (or similarly at, in case of war, NATO's Hawker Hunter or Fiat G.91) flying at 300 metres per second (670 mph), with an identical mass of 30 mm projectiles would result in a kill probability 1.5 times greater than with 23 mm projectiles. An increase in the maximum engagement altitude from 2,000 to 4,000 metres (6,600 to 13,100 ft) and increased effectiveness when engaging lightly armoured ground targets were also cited.

The initial requirements set for the system were to achieve twice the performance in terms of range, altitude and combat effectiveness of the ZSU-23-4, additionally the system should have a reaction time no greater than 10 seconds. Due to the similarities in the fire control of artillery and missiles, it was decided that the Tunguska would be a combined gun and missile system. A combined system is more effective than the ZSU-23-4, engaging targets at long-range with missiles, and shorter range targets with guns.

In addition to KBP as the primary contractor, other members of the Soviet military-industrial complex were involved in the project; the chassis was developed at the Minsk tractor factory, the radio equipment at the Ulyanovsk Mechanical Factory, central computer at NIEMI ("Antey"), guidance and navigational systems by VNII "Signal", and optics were developed by the Leningrad Optical Mechanical Association (LOMO).

However, development was slowed between 1975 and 1977 after the introduction of the 9K33 Osa missile system, which seemed to fill the same requirement but with greater missile performance. After some considerable debate, it was felt that a purely missile-based system would not be as effective at dealing with very low flying attack helicopters attacking at short range with no warning as had been proven so successful in the 1973 Arab-Israeli War. Since the reaction time of a gun system is around 8–10 seconds, compared to approximately 30 seconds for a missile-based system, development was restarted.

The initial designs were completed in 1973, with pilot production completed in 1976 at the Ulyanovsk Mechanical Factory. System testing and trials were conducted between September 1980 and December 1981 on the Donguzskiy range. It was officially accepted into service on 8 September 1982 and the initial version, which was designated 2K22/2S6, had four missiles in the ready to fire position (two on each side) and two 2A38 autocannons. The Tunguska entered into limited service from 1984, when the first batteries were delivered to the army.

After a limited production run of the original 2K22, an improved version designated 2K22M/2S6M entered service in 1990. The 2K22M featured several improvements with eight ready-to-fire missiles (four on each side) as well as modifications to the fire control programs, missiles and the general reliability of the system, and improved autocannons, 2A38M.

Tunguska underwent further improvement when, in 2003, the Russian armed forces accepted the Tunguska-M1 or 2K22M1 into service. The M1 introduced the new 9M311-M1 missile, which made a number of changes allowing the 2K22M1 to engage small targets like cruise missiles by replacing the eight-beam laser proximity fuze with a radio fuse. An additional modification afforded greater resistance to infrared countermeasures by replacing the missile tracking flare with a pulsed IR beacon. Other improvements included an increased missile range from 8 to 10 kilometres (5.0 to 6.2 mi), improved optical tracking and accuracy, improved fire control co-ordination between components of a battery and the command post. Overall, the Tunguska-M1 has a combat efficiency 1.3–1.5 times greater than the Tunguska-M.

== Description ==
The GRAU index lists the "Tunguska" system as 2K22. A complete system or battery consists of six 2S6 combat vehicles armed with the 9M311 "Treugol'nik" (triangle) surface-to-air missile and two 2A38 30 mm cannons. These are accompanied by up to three 2F77 transloader trucks. The 2K22 is also associated with a variety of support facilities including the 2F55, 1R10 and 2V110 repair and maintenance vehicles, the MTO-AGZ workshop and the 9V921 test vehicle and others. These facilities provide maintenance for the 2K22 battery in the field as well as scheduled overhauls. Each system can attack six targets simultaneously (1 for each machine 2S6) limited to a ceiling of 3.5 kilometres (2.2 mi) and an elevation of −10° to 87°.

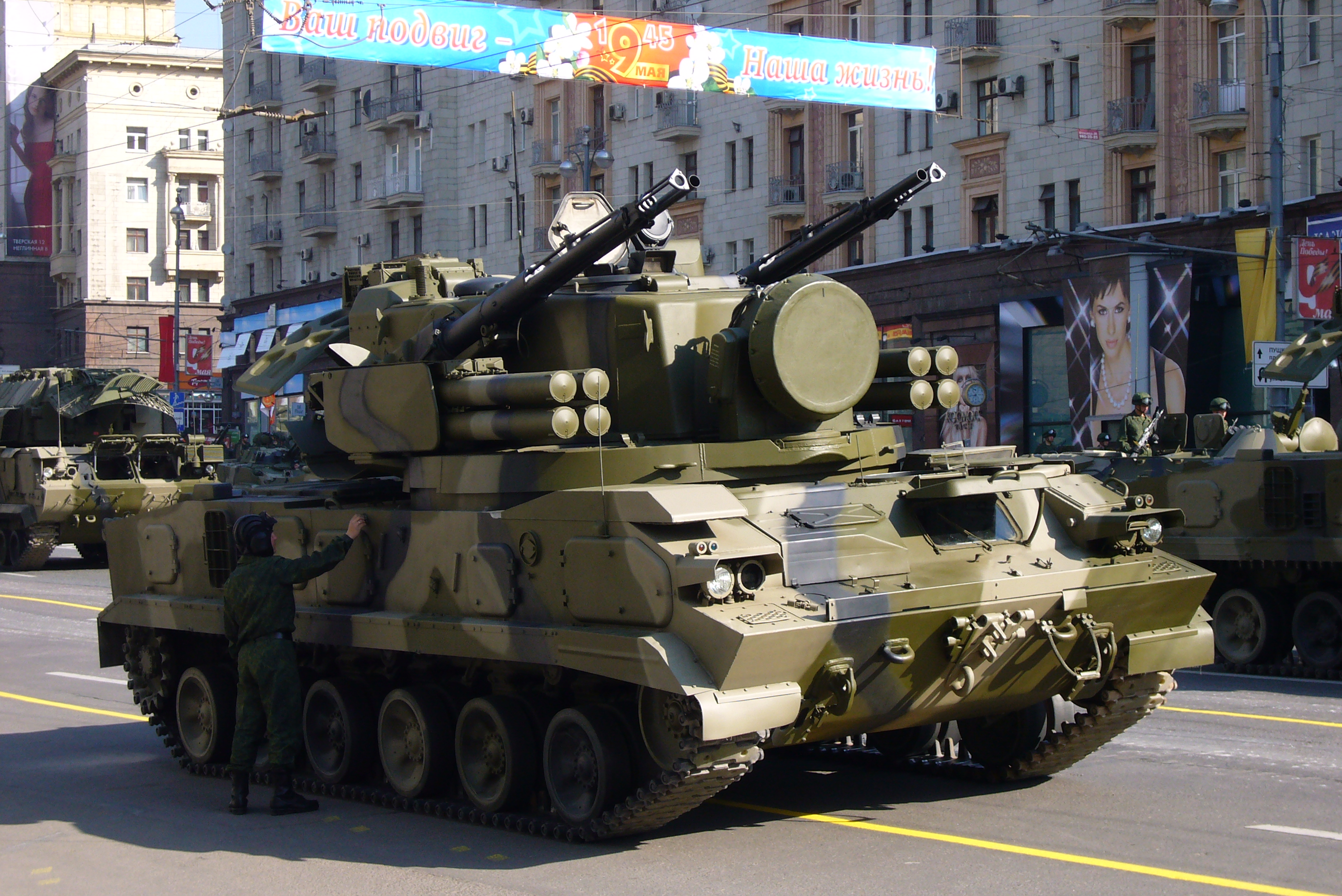
Tunguska at 2008 Moscow Victory Parade

The 2S6 combat vehicle uses the GM-352 and later GM-352M chassis developed and produced by the Minsk Tractor Plant (MTZ) which has six road wheels with hydropneumatic suspension on each side, a drive sprocket at the rear and three return rollers. An NBC system is also integrated into the chassis, which is armored to protect it from small arms fire. an automatic gear change and diagnostic capability are available with latest Tunguska-M1 which uses the new GM-5975 chassis developed and produced by MMZ. GM-5975.25 has a cruising range of 500 kilometres (310 mi) and a maximum speed of 65 km/h (40 mph). It can function in ambient temperatures of −50 to 50 °C (−58 to 122 °F) and up to an altitude of 3,000 metres (9,800 ft). It has an ability of climb hills with up to a 35° slope. Overall, the layout is similar to the previous ZSU-23-4 with a large central 360-degree rotating turret (designated the 2A40) containing the armament, sensors and three of the crew: the commander, gunner and radar operator. The driver sits in the front left of the hull, with a gas turbine APU to his right and the multi-fuel diesel engine in the rear of the hull.

An electromechanically scanned parabolic E-band (10 kW power) target acquisition radar is mounted on the rear top of the turret that when combined with the turret front mounted J-band (150 kW power) monopulse tracking radar forms the 1RL144 (NATO:Hot Shot) pulse-Doppler 3D radar system, which can detect and track targets flying as high as 3,500 metres (11,500 ft). Alongside the 1A26 digital computer and the 1G30 angle measurement system form the 1A27 radar complex. Tunguska-M has the 1RL144M radar with detection range 18 kilometres (11 mi) and tracking range 16 kilometres (9.9 mi). The mechanically scanned target acquisition radar for the Tunguska-M1 offers a 360° field of view, a detection range of around 18 kilometres (11 mi) and can detect targets flying as low as 15 metres (49 ft). Its tracking radar has a range of 16 kilometres (9.9 mi). A C/D-band IFF system is also fitted and designated 1RL138. The radar system is highly protected against various types of interference, and can work if there are mountains on the horizon, regardless of the background. The system is able to fire on the move using 30 mm cannons, although it must be stationary to fire missiles. The maximum target speed can be up to 500 metres per second (1,100 mph).

Standard equipment of the 2S6 and 2S6M includes a computerized fire control system, heating, ventilation, NBC system, an automatic fire detection and suppression system, navigational equipment, night vision aids, 1V116 intercom, external communications system with an R-173 receiver -modernized in the 2S6M for better communication with the command post- and monitoring equipment. The vehicle also has protection against the effects of nuclear, biological and chemical weapons.

A battery of six Tunguska can automatically receive fire control information via an encrypted radio link, this allows targets to be distributed between individual units from a Ranzhir or PPRU battery command post, which can receive target information from either AWACS or early warning radar or in the case of the PPRU its own radar equipment.

== Variants ==
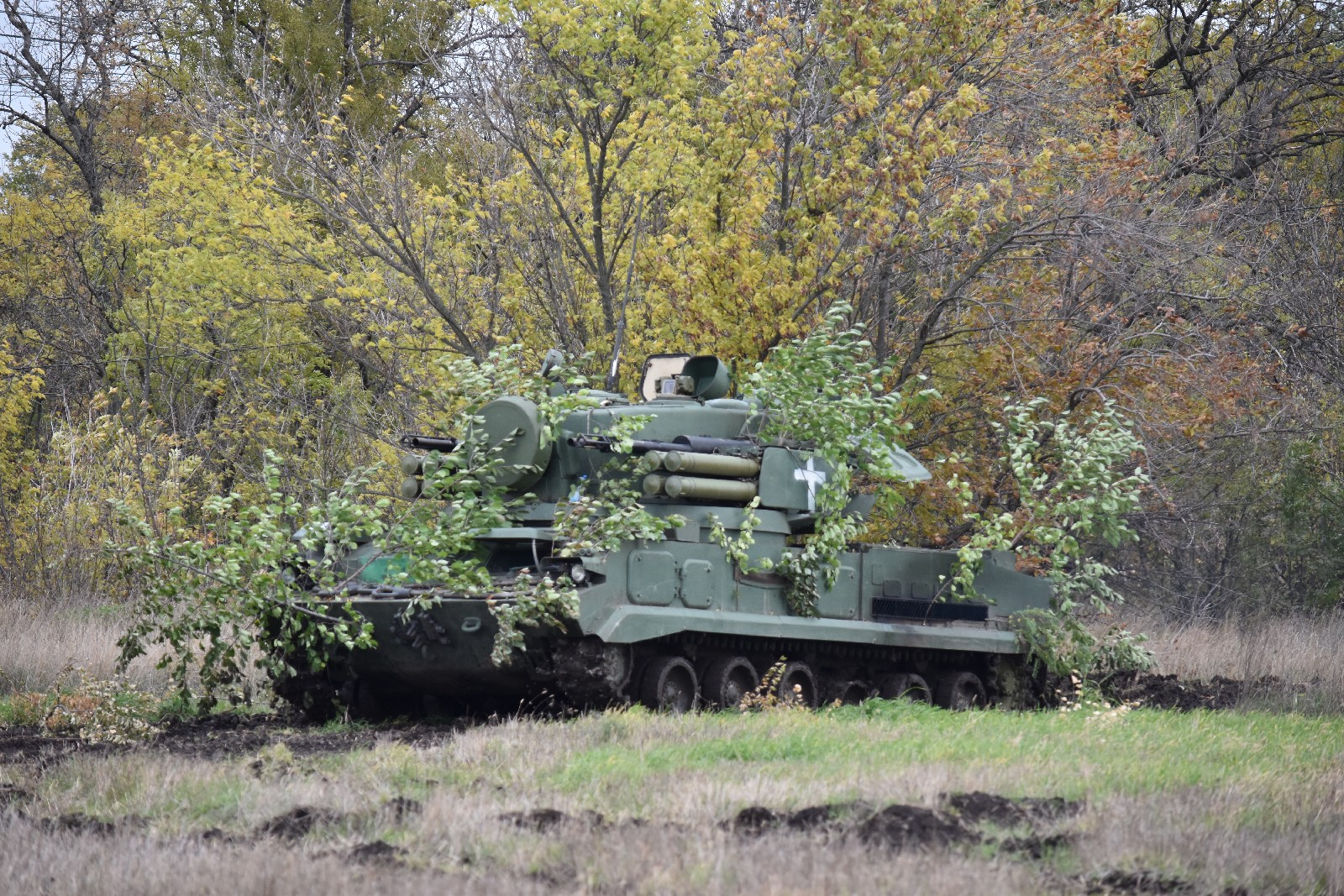
A 2K22 Tunguska of the Ukrainian 30th Mechanized Brigade camouflaged with tree branches during the Battle of Bakhmut, 3 December 2022

=== 2K22 ===
Original system, with 9M311, 9M311K (3M87) or 9M311-1 missiles with a range of 8 kilometres (5.0 mi). Some of these early versions of the "Tunguska" system were known as "Treugol'nik" (Russian Треугольник—triangle). This system is mounted on the 2S6 integrated air defense vehicle.

=== 2K22M (1990) ===
Main production system, with 9M311M (3M88) missiles and 2A38M autocannons. This integrated air defense vehicle 2S6M is based on the GM-352M chassis. 2F77M transporter-loader. 2F55-1, 1R10-1 and 2V110-1 repair and maintenance vehicles.

=== 2K22M1 (2003) ===
Improved version with the 2S6M1 combat vehicle on a GM-5975 chassis, using the 9M311-M1 missile (range: 10 kilometres (6.2 mi)) and with an improved fire control system. Passed state trials and entered service with the Russian armed forces on 31 July 2003.

== Guns ==
The dual 2А38 30 mm cannons (as well as the later 2A38M) were designed by the KBP Instrument Design Bureau and manufactured by the Tulamashzavod Joint Stock Company. The Tunguska typically carries 1,904 rounds with mixtures of APDS, AP-T, APDS Frag-T, HE-I, and API. The cannons are fired alternatively with a combined rate of fire of between 3,900 and 5,000 rounds per minute (1,950 to 2,500 rpm for each gun), which gives a continuous fire time of 23–30 seconds before running out of ammunition, and have a muzzle velocity of 960 metres per second (2,100 mph). Bursts of between 83 and 250 rounds are fired as determined by the target type, with an engagement range between 0.2 to 4.0 kilometres (0.12 to 2.49 mi). HE-T and HE-I shells are used and fitted with an A-670 time and impact fuze which includes an arming delay and self destruct mechanism. The 2K22 can fire its cannons in two primary modes of operation, radar and optical. In radar mode, the target tracking is fully automatic, with the guns aimed using data from the radar. In optical mode, the gunner tracks the target through the 1A29 stabilized sight, with the radar providing range data.

== Missiles ==
9M311
- Type: Surface-to-air missile
- Place of origin: Soviet Union

Service history
- In service: 1982–present
- Used by: Belarus, India, Morocco, Syria, Russia, former Soviet Union, Ukraine

Production history
- Designer: KBP Instrument Design Bureau
- Designed: 1970–1980
- Produced: 1976–present
- Variants: 9M311, 9M311K, 9M311-1, 9M311M, 9M311-M1, 57E6

Specifications (9M311)
- Mass: 57 kilograms (126 lb)
- Length: 2,560 millimetres (8.40 ft)
- Warhead: Continuous-rod and steel cubes
- Warhead weight: 9 kilograms (20 lb)
- Detonation mechanism: Laser fuze (Radio fuze for 9M311-M1)
- Propellant: Solid-fuel rocket
- Operational range: 8 to 10 kilometres (5.0 to 6.2 mi) 9M311-M1)
- Flight ceiling: 3,500 metres (11,500 ft)
- Boost time: 2 stages: boost to 900 metres per second (2,000 mph), then sustained 600 metres per second (1,300 mph) stage to range
- Maximum speed: 900 metres per second (2,000 mph) maximum
- Guidance system: Radio Command guidance
- Steering system: Rocket motor with four steerable control surfaces
- Accuracy: 5 metres (16 ft)
- Launch platform: 2S6 combat vehicle
- Transport: 2F77 transloader

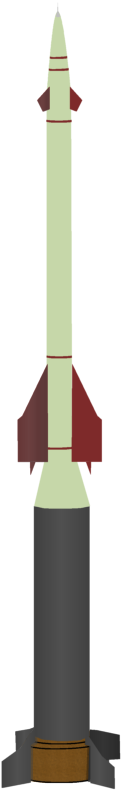
Illustration of the 9M311

The system uses the same 9M311 (NATO: SA-19/SA-N-11) missile family as the naval CIWS Kashtan which can engage targets at a range of 1.5 to 8 kilometres (0.93 to 4.97 mi) and to an altitude of 5 to 3,500 metres (16 to 11,483 ft) the Tunguska-M1 uses the improved 9M311-M1 missile with an increased range of 2.5 to 10 kilometres (1.6 to 6.2 mi) and an altitude of 15 to 3,500 metres (49 to 11,483 ft). The missile has two stages, a large booster stage with four folding fins, which boosts the missile to a velocity of 900 metres per second (2,000 mph). The second stage has four fixed fins, and four steerable control surfaces. The complete missile is around 2.56 metres (8.4 ft) long and a mass of 57 kilograms (126 lb).

Guidance is performed by the target tracking radar, it constantly relays target range, elevation and bearing to the fire-control computer, and on the basis of this data the computer generates the laying commands for the guns or the trajectory corrections for the missiles. A back-up tracking method can be used by the gunner, who uses the stabilized sight of the Tunguska to track the target in elevation and azimuth. The gunner is initially cued towards the target by the system's search radar. Once the missile is steered to within 5 metres (16 ft) of the target, an active laser or radio fuse (9M311-M1) is triggered. A contact fuse is also fitted. The warhead weighs about 9 kilograms (20 lb), and is a continuous-rod system, consisting of 60 centimetres (24 in) long, 6 to 9 millimetres (0.24 to 0.35 in) diameter rods, which break into fragments weighing 2–3 grams (0.071–0.106 oz). The rods form a complete ring about 5 metres (16 ft) from the missile.

=== Missile variants ===
- 9M311: Original missile, laser proximity fuze, range 8 kilometres (5.0 mi).
- 9M311K (3M87): Naval version of the 9M311 used by the Kortik system. Export version of Kashtan uses the 9M311-1E missile.
- 9M311-1: Export version of the missile.
- 9M311M (3M88): Improved version of the missile.
- 9M311-M1: Used with the Tunguska-M1 radar proximity fuse for improved capability against cruise missiles. Pulsed tracking light instead of constant flare for better resistance to infrared countermeasures. Range improved to 10 kilometres (6.2 mi).

=== Similar systems ===
- FK-1000: 9M311 missiles were first exported to China in 2005, and at the 9th Zhuhai Airshow held in November 2012, a suspected Chinese derivative of 2K22 Tunguska designated as FK-1000 was revealed to public. The China Aerospace Science and Industry Corporation (CASIC) developed FK-1000, differs from 2K22 Tunguska in that FK-1000 is mounted on an 8 × 8 truck, and the 30 mm guns of Tunguska are replaced by 25 mm autocannons. The radars of FK-1000 are arranged in exactly the same way as in the 2K22 Tunguska, but mechanically scanned surveillance and tracking radars of Tunguska are both replaced by phased array radars in FK-1000. A total of 12 missiles are mounted on the sides of the weapons station, with 6 on each side, in the form of 2 rows of 3 containers/launchers each. The missile of FK-1000 is designated as KS-1000, which is also surprisingly similar to 9M311, and this has led many in the west to claim that FK-1000 system is derived from 2K22 Tunguska, but with cheaper price tag than the latest Russian system: in comparison to the 15 million dollars of Pantsir-S1 (SA-22), FK-1000 system is priced at 5 million dollars.
- Sky Dragon 12: The Sky Dragon 12 (Tianlong 12; GAS5) is a truck-based air defense system developed by China North Industries Corporation (Norinco). The system consists of 12 rounds of 9M311/FK1000 missiles, with the radar, optics, and missiles mounted on a Shaanxi SX2400 8x8 truck.

== Combat history ==
Variants of the 2K22 system have continued to serve in the Soviet and later Russian armed forces since their initial introduction in 1984. The 2K22 has also been inducted into the armed forces of a number of foreign states, most notably India. The 2K22 has been used in the 2008 South Ossetia war by Russian armed forces.

The 2K22 has been used in the Russian invasion of Ukraine by Ukrainian and Russian forces. In June 2023, Ukraine ordered the repair, refurbishment, and spare parts through the International Fund for Ukraine.

== Operators ==
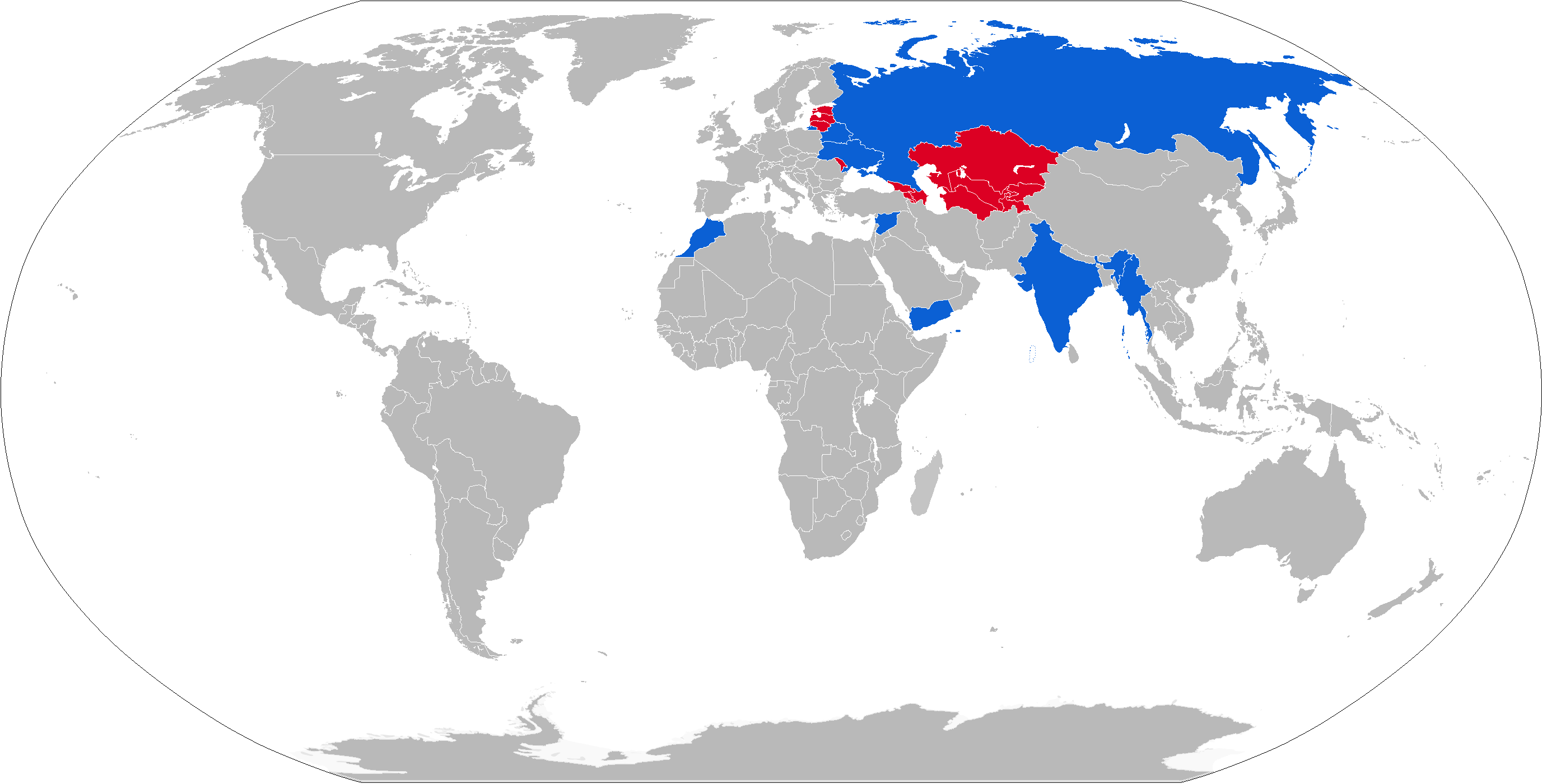
Operators Current Former

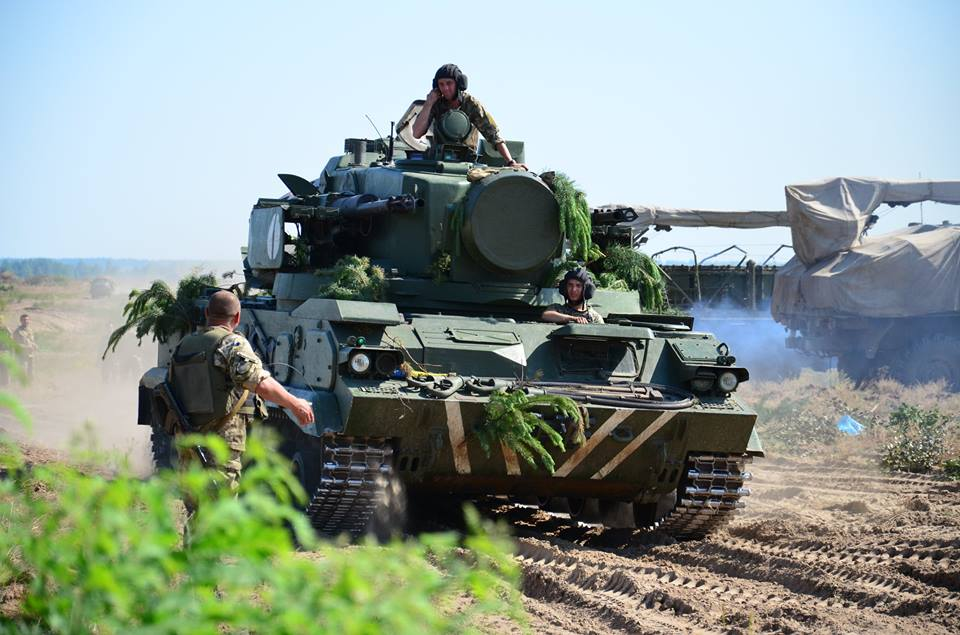
2S6 of the Ukrainian Army

=== Current operators ===
- Belarus: Unknown number of 2S6 in active service as of 2024
- India: Up to 80 2S6 in service as of 2024. SIPRI reports at least 66 2S6 received between 1997-2009. A further order for the Tunguska Air Defence Missile System was placed on 27 March 2026 at a cost of ₹445 crore (US$46 million).
- Morocco: 12 2S6М in service as of 2024.
- Myanmar: 38 2S6 acquired from Russia between 2004 and 2007.
- Russia: At least 240 2S6 as of 2024, according to Military Balance 2024. 21 Tunguska-M1s were delivered in 2012–2017.
- Ukraine: 75 2S6 according to Military Balance 2024. At least two have been captured by the Ukrainian Armed Forces during the ongoing Russo-Ukrainian War as of 11 Nov 2024.

=== Former operators ===
- Soviet Union: passed on to successor states

== Comparable systems ==
- EE-11 air defense – (Brazil)
- Pantsir-S1 – (Russia)
- K30 Biho – (South Korea)
- HS M09 BOV-3 – (Yugoslavia)
- Air defense anti-tank system – (Switzerland)
- Flugabwehrkanonenpanzer Gepard – (West Germany)
- PZA Loara – (Poland)
- Tor missile system – (Soviet Union, Russia)
- CS/SA5 – (China)
- PGL-625 – (China)
- Type 87 self-propelled anti-aircraft gun – (Japan)
- Type 95 SPAAA – (China)
- LAV-AD (Air Defense) – (Canada)

== Bibliography ==
- Koll, Christian (2009). Soviet Cannon: A Comprehensive Study of Soviet Arms and Ammunition in Calibres 12.7mm to 57mm. Austria: Koll. p. 276. ISBN 978-3-200-01445-9.
- Guardia, Mike (20 May 2015). Self-Propelled Anti-Aircraft Guns of the Soviet Union. Bloomsbury Publishing. ISBN 978-1-4728-0624-6.
