= Istanbul-class frigate =

Frigate class of the Turkish Naval Forces

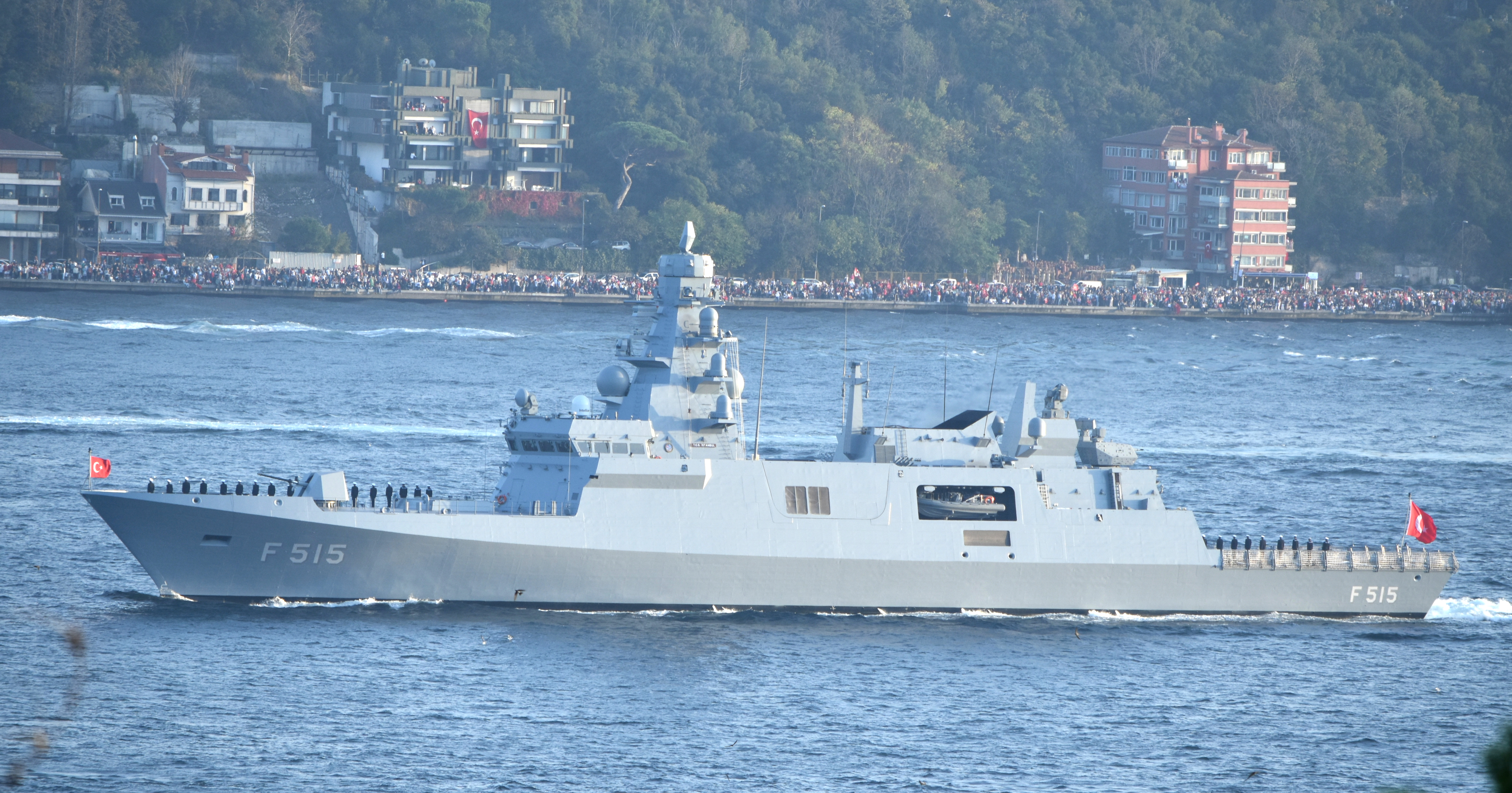
- TCG Istanbul (F-515) traverses the Bosporus in celebration of the 100th year of the Turkish Republic

Class overview
- Name: Istanbul class
- Builders: Istanbul Naval Shipyard; Anadolu Shipyard; Sedef Shipyard; Sefine Shipyard
- Operators: Turkish Naval Forces; Indonesian Navy (future)
- Preceded by: Barbaros class
- Cost: $500 million per unit
- Built: 2017–present
- In commission: 2024–present
- Planned: Total 10: Turkey: 8; Indonesia: 2
- Building: 5
- Completed: 3
- Active: 1

General characteristics
- Type: Multirole frigate
- Displacement: 3,100 tonnes
- Length: 113.2 m (371 ft 5 in)
- Beam: 14.40 m (47 ft 3 in)
- Draft: 4.05 m (13 ft 3 in)
- Installed power: 4 x 560kw Generator
- Propulsion: Combined diesel and gas (CODAG) arrangement: 1 x GE LM2500 Gas turbine; 2 x 5.766HP MTU Diesel Machine; 2 x Controllable Pitch Propeller (CPP)
- Speed: Economy: 14 kn (26 km/h; 16 mph); Maximum: >29 kn (54 km/h; 33 mph)
- Range: 5,700 nmi (10,600 km; 6,600 mi) at 14 kn (26 km/h; 16 mph)
- Boats & landing craft carried: 2 x Rigid-hulled inflatable boat (RHIB)
- Complement: 123
- Sensors & processing systems: Radars: Aselsan Cenk-400N 2D GaN based solid-state transmit/receive modules AESA search radar with 1000 targets tracking capacity and ~400 km maximum range Aselsan ALPER-200N LPI Surface Radar Aslesan AKREP-300N (AKR-D Block B-1/2) Fire Control Radar; Other systems: Aselsan SeaEye-AHTAPOT Electro-optical reconnaissance, surveillance and targeting system Aselsan PIRI-100 IRST Aselsan TAKS-100/76GFCS main gun fire control system ATMACA 100/AFCS anti-ship missile fire control system, HİSAR 100N/FCS air defence missile fire control system Aselsan KULAÇ Sounder system DEMES meteorological measurement system AHTAPOT-100 Electro-optical director, ANS 510-M gyro system, LIAS 200-N Advanced Laser Warning Receiver System, Infrared Trace Management System, Sonar: Aselsan FERSAH 100N/MF hull mounted sonar; Communications: SATCOM, Link 11/16, Link 22 Local Area Network, Internal Communication System, Underwater phone; Combat Systems: Havelsan ADVENT Combat Management system, GEMS Integrated combat system, IdentIFF M5 TPX & I/LR IFF system, AcroSAT Ku-120-M Satellite combat system, AcroSAT Ku-150-M Satellite combat system
- Electronic warfare & decoys: ESM: ASELSAN ARES 2N/NGE; ECM: Aslesan AREAS 2NC/E; ARES-NEWS Central management system; Decoy: Aselsan HIZIR Torpedo countermeasures system; Aselsan KARTACA-N Decoy ejection system
- Armament: Guns: 1 × MKE 76 mm/62-caliber gun or OTO Melara 76 mm Super Rapid (only on TCG Istanbul) main gun; 1 × Aselsan GOKDENIZ 35 mm dual barreled CIWS; 2 × Aselsan SMASH 200/25 25 mm RCWS; Anti-ship missiles: 4 × 4 (total 16) Atmaca anti-ship missiles; Vertical launching system: 16-cell MiDLAS vertical launching system for Istanbul (further ships may contain more VLS): up to 16 SAPAN or SIPER Block 1 Surface-to-air missiles or up to 64 smaller Hisar-D surface to air missiles; Torpedoes: ZIPKIN 100/D Torpedo tube system; 2 × 324 mm (13 in) Double Torpedo launchers with Roketsan Orka or MK-46M5 Torpedoes
- Aircraft carried: Hangar and platform for: S-70B Seahawk ASW helicopter; KALKAN VTOL; Titra Alpin 2

The Istanbul-class frigates (also known as TF-100, MILGEM II, İstif and I class) are a class of multirole frigates currently being constructed for the Turkish Naval Forces and the Indonesian Navy. The ship class developed under the MILGEM national warship program with enhanced endurance and MiDLAS vertical launching system (VLS) for multi-role capability. Turkish company STM is the designer and prime contractor of the ship class. The class is also offered for export. Ships of the class are made by four Turkish shipyards. The frigate class is fast and highly maneuverable due to using of CODAG technology.

On 19 January 2017, the Turkish Navy held a ceremonial steel cut for the lead ship TCG Istanbul (F 515). Istanbul was laid down on 3 July 2017 and launched on 23 January 2021.

== Design ==
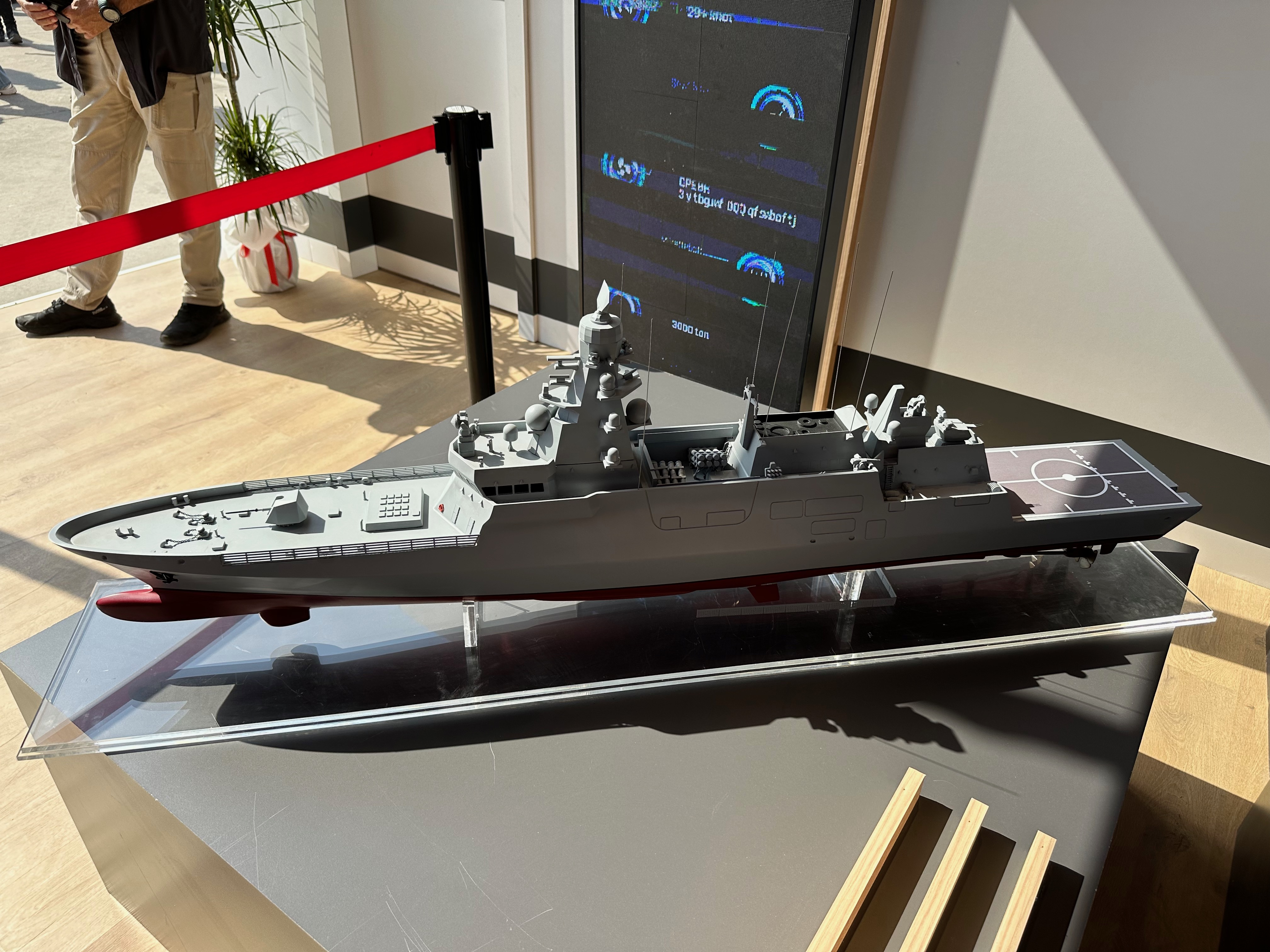
Model of TCG Istanbul (F-515)

The Istanbuls have the guns, self protection and anti-submarine warfare systems of the Ada-class. but with twice the number of anti-ship missiles and will be equipped with the indigenous MDAS vertical launching system.

The first ship of the class, TCG Istanbul, was laid down on 19 January 2017. The fifth and largest modern warship to be both indigenously designed and built in Turkey under the MILGEM program, it is claimed that more than 75% of its systems are of indigenous manufacture. Its steel cutting ceremony was attended by Turkish Defence Minister Fikri Işık and senior military officers, including Admiral Bülent Bostanoğlu, Commander of the Turkish Naval Forces.

Construction took six years and the vessel was commissioned into service on 19 January 2024.

=== Sensors and systems ===
Combat operations are managed by the network-centric ADVENT Combat Management System (CMS). The frigate is equipped with an electronic warfare system and an infrared detection and tracking system developed by the Turkish company Aselsan. Additional ship systems and software are supplied by Havelsan, along with components from various local subcontractors.

=== Armament ===
The Istanbul-class frigates are multi-mission ships with numerous combat systems, including anti-aircraft missiles, anti-ship missiles and an anti-submarine warfare (ASW) system. The ship is armed with 16 canister launched Atmaca anti-ship missiles with a range of 250 km. A 16-cell MiDLAS vertical launching system (National Vertical Launching System) installed for different types of missiles. The MiDLAS is capable of missile integration through standardized interfaces. The VLS is enabling the launch of surface-to-air, surface-to-surface, surface-to-ground and anti-submarine missiles without reliance on dedicated cell configurations. The VLS can launch Hisar-D RF and Siper Block 1 surface-to-air missiles, Atmaca anti-ship missiles. SİPER Block-1 is an active radar seeker-equipped long range surface-to-air missile (SAM) with a range of more than 100 km. On the other hand, HİSAR-D RF is an active radar seeker-equipped surface-to-air missile (SAM) with a range of more than 40 km. The HİSAR-D RF is a quad pack capable missile. One MiDLAS cell can carry four HİSAR-D RF missiles in a quad pack configuration instead of one. The frigate also carries two twin 324 mm torpedo tubes with Roketsan Orka torpedoes for anti-submarine warfare (ASW) with a range of 15 km and speed of more than 45 kn.

The ship class uses a 76 mm bow-mounted main gun. The first ship Istanbul installed with Italian made 76 mm/62-caliber Super Rapid gun, when later ships are installed with a Turkish-made MKE 76 mm/62-caliber gun. The MKE 76 mm/62-caliber gun has a range of 16 km with standard ammunition and 20 km with extended-range ammunition. It is a multirole gun that can be used for air defense, anti-surface warfare and shore bombardment. For point defense and asymmetric warfare the ship is installed with a Aselsan GOKDENIZ 35 mm dual-barreled gun-based close-in weapon system (CIWS) and two Aselsan SMASH 200/25 remote controlled weapon station (RCWS). The CIWS has a fire rate of 1100 rounds per minute with an effective range of 4 km against fast targets including sea skimming anti-ship missile. The CIWS fires 35×228 mm Aselsan ATOM 35mm airburst round and high-explosive incendiary (HEI) ammunition. The ATOM airburst ammunition is purposely designed to be used against fast-flying targets, including anti-ship missiles. The Aselsan SMASH 200/25 RCWS can used against attacking self-destructive unmanned surface vehicle (Kamikaze sea drone).

=== Aviation ===
The aft section of the ship includes a flight deck and a hangar.

=== Dimensions and propulsion ===
At full load, the ship's maximum displacement ranges from 3,000 to 3,171 tonnes.

This plant includes one General Electric LM2500 gas turbine and two MTU diesel engines, which drive two propellers.

== History and background ==
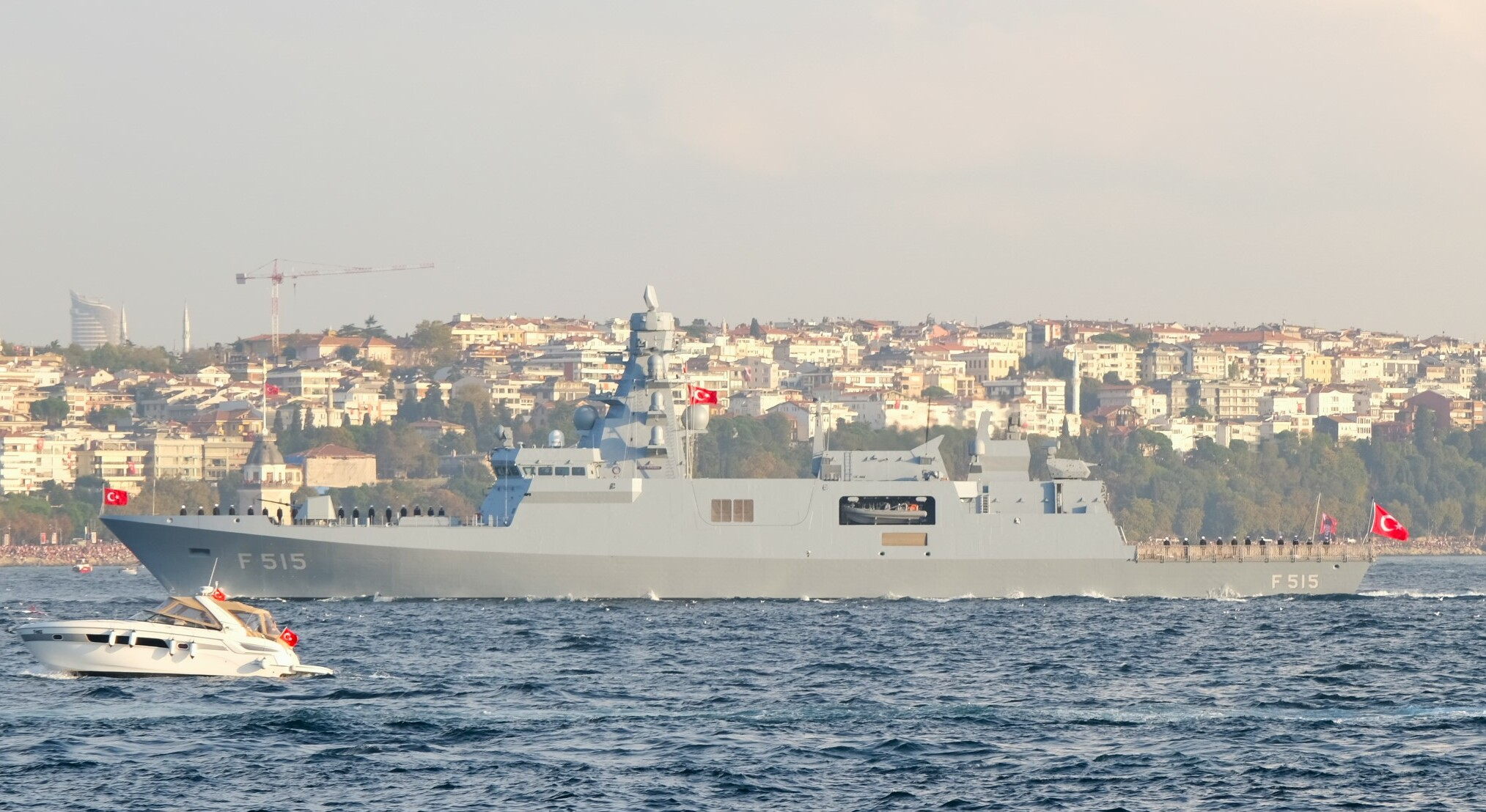
TCG Istanbul (F-515) at the Bosporus strait, during the naval parade for celebrating the centennial of the Turkish Republic, 29 October 2023.

The Istanbul class has its origins in the Turkish MILGEM project for developing national warships and warship building industry. The program calls for the construction of a warship family in three classes, where all vessels would be designed with high degree of commonality. The first product of the project emerged as the Ada-class anti-submarine/patrol corvette. The Istanbul class, originally known as the TF-100 class under the MILGEM-G designation, belongs to the second development phase, where the structure of the Ada class corvette is extended to host multi-role capabilities.

== Export ==
It was stated in Aselsan's 2023 Annual Report that the Istanbul-class frigate was exported to an unnamed Middle Eastern country.

Indonesian shipyard PAL Indonesia signed a memorandum of understanding with TAIS Shipyards on procuring the Istanbul-class frigate in June 2025. Minister of Defense of Indonesia, Sjafrie Sjamsoeddin, signed the procurement contract for two frigates on 26 July 2025. On 19 January 2026, during the DIMDEX 2026 expo in Doha, Qatar, TAIS Shipyards signed a US$1 billion agreement with Barzan Holdings of Qatar to supply TCG İzmir and İçel to the Indonesian Navy. Barzan Holdings will provide the loan to Indonesia for the acquisition of the frigates. Turkish media Defence Turk claimed that the export agreement is yet to be confirmed as there are issues which are "under negotiation".

== Ships in the class ==
Pennant no.	Name	Namesake	Builder	Launched	Commissioned	Status	Note
F-515	TCG Istanbul	Istanbul	Istanbul Naval Shipyard	23 January 2021	19 January 2024	In service	
F-516	TCG İzmir	İzmir	Anadolu Shipyard	10 January 2025		Planned	Sea trials. 10 August 2026
F-517	TCG İzmit	İzmit	Sedef Shipyard	11 January 2025		Planned	Sea trials. 15 September 2026
F-518	TCG İçel	İçel	Sefine Shipyard	1 September 2025		Planned	Launched
F-519	TCG Akdeniz	Mediterranean Sea	Anadolu Shipyard	2 February 2026		Planned	Launched Will be sold to Indonesia.
F-520	TCG Karadeniz	Black Sea	Sedef Shipyard	27 July 2026		Planned	Launched
F-521	TCG Ege	Ege	Sefine Shipyard			Planned	Will be sold to Indonesia.
F-522	TCG Marmara	Marmara	Anadolu Shipyard			Planned	

== See also ==
- List of frigate classes in service

=== Equivalent frigates of the same era ===
- Constellation class
- Miguel Malvar class
- Mogami class
- Tamandaré class
- Chungnam class
- FDI
- Baden-Württemberg class
