= PNS Moawin =

At least three ships of the Pakistan Navy have been named Moawin:

- PNS Moawin (1989), a Vulcan-class repair ship launched as USS Hector in 1942 she was transferred to Pakistan and renamed in 1989. She was returned to the United States in 1994 and scrapped.
- PNS Moawin (A20), a replenishment ship launched as HNLMS Poolster in 1963 she was transferred to Pakistan and renamed in 1994.
- PNS Moawin (A39), a replenishment oiler launched in 2016
