= Oerlikon KBA =

Swiss autocannon

Oerlikon KBA 25 mm
- Type: Autocannon
- Place of origin: Switzerland

Service history
- In service: 1975–present
- Used by: See operators

Production history
- Designer: TRW Inc. Oerlikon-Bührle
- Designed: TRW model 6425: designed in 1964–66, programme bought by Oerlikon-Bührle in 1967; KBA design: 1967–73
- Manufacturer: Oerlikon-Bührle (1973–1989); Oerlikon Contraves AG (1989–1999); Rheinmetall Air Defence AG (1999–2004); Rheinmetall Italia S.p.A (2004–present); Licence manufacturers: Nihon Seiko Jyo
- Developed from: TRW model 6425
- Produced: Since 1973
- No. built: >6,000 (3,084 were made as of January 2003)

Specifications
- Mass: 112 kg (247 lb)
- Length: 2,806 mm (110.5 in)
- Barrel length: 2,173 mm (85.6 in)
- Width: 263 mm (10.4 in)
- Height: 283 mm (11.1 in)
- Shell: NATO 25×137mm
- Caliber: 25 mm (L/87)
- Action: Gas operated
- Breech: Rotating bolt (two-piece snaplock)
- Recoil: Hydromechanical
- Rate of fire: Single shot; Rapid single shot: 175 rpm; Burst: 600 rpm
- Muzzle velocity: 1,100 m/s (3,600 ft/s); 1,400 m/s (4,600 ft/s)
- Effective firing range: 2,700 m (8,900 ft)
- Maximum firing range: 5,850 m (19,190 ft)
- Feed system: Dual Feed

The Oerlikon KBA is a 25 mm (25×137 mm) automatic cannon which was developed as a close-range multi-purpose weapon for the mechanized battlefield. It was originally manufactured by Oerlikon (now Rheinmetall AG), and is currently produced at Rheinmetall Italia S.p.A. facilities. It features a positively locked breech and is gas and recoil-operated, with a rotating bolt head and a dual ammunition feeding system using 25×137 mm NATO ammunition. The rate of fire in burst mode is up to 600 rounds per minute, but it can be electronically adjusted and reduced to a selectable range between 100 and 175 rounds per minute, or single-shot mode.

Thanks to its high rate of fire, one of the highest in its class, and to the new 25×137 mm C-UAS ammunition technology, the KBA provides effective self-protection against drones. The dual ammunition feeder allows two different types of ammunition to be loaded, as well as rapid switching between them. This gives the 25 mm KBA true dual-mission capability. Its low recoil of less than 10 kN enables installation on various platforms, ranging from turrets for heavy tracked vehicles to remote controlled weapon stations (RCWS) for light armoured 4×4 reconnaissance vehicles.

== Description ==
The Oerlikon KBA 25 mm is a fully automatic cannon based on the proven gas-operation principle with a rotating bolt head similar to the Mauser M 98 or M16 and double belt feed for the ammunition.

The KBA offers a wide range of firing modes: single shot, programmable rapid single shot with a rate of fire programmable from 100 to 175 rds/min and full automatic fire up to 600 rds/min. The cannon functions, such as cocking and firing, are electrically actuated by a remote control unit or manually operated, in auxiliary mode, by means of a hand crank and a trigger pedal.

The Oerlikon KBA 25mm cannon has been designed for integration in various types of mounts, small size and low weight offering various integration possibilities such as:

- Manual gun mountings for armoured vehicles and naval vessels.
- Remote Controlled Weapon Stations for armoured vehicles and naval vessels.
- Air defence systems.
- Helicopter mounts.

The various types of available ammunition combined with the unique Instant Ammunition Selection Device and selectable rates of fire support any type of operational use.

== History ==
At the turn of 1964-65, the US Army started the ambitious MICV-65 program to replace the M113 armored personnel carrier with a new infantry fighting vehicle. As an offshoot of MICV-65, the Bushmaster project aimed to create a new medium-caliber cannon for the US Army.

The Bushmaster project was intended to meet the armament requirements of future infantry fighting vehicles of the 1980s and 1990s:

- Ammunition performance: penetrate 25mm of steel armour, at a 60° (NATO) angle of impact, at 1000m range, corresponding to the armor of a well-armored infantry fighting vehicle.
- Instant ammunition selection: for engagement of different targets.
- Selectable firing mode: Accurate single-shot, bursts with a rate of fire of more than 550 rds/min for engagement of aircraft.
- Compact structure: with low weight for installation in gun turrets of APCs.
- Simple to operate and service: in the hands of infantry.

In 1960, the American company TRW (Thomson, Ramo-Wooldridge Inc.) Jet & Ordinance Division, soon to become TRW Inc., developed the experimental 25x137mm gun as part of the Bushmaster project. The new TRW project was to design an automatic cannon around the experimental 25mm cartridge under the company internal designation of "TRW-6425". The project leader was engineer Eugene Stoner, the designer of the famous ArmaLite AR-10, AR-15, and M16A1 family of assault rifles.

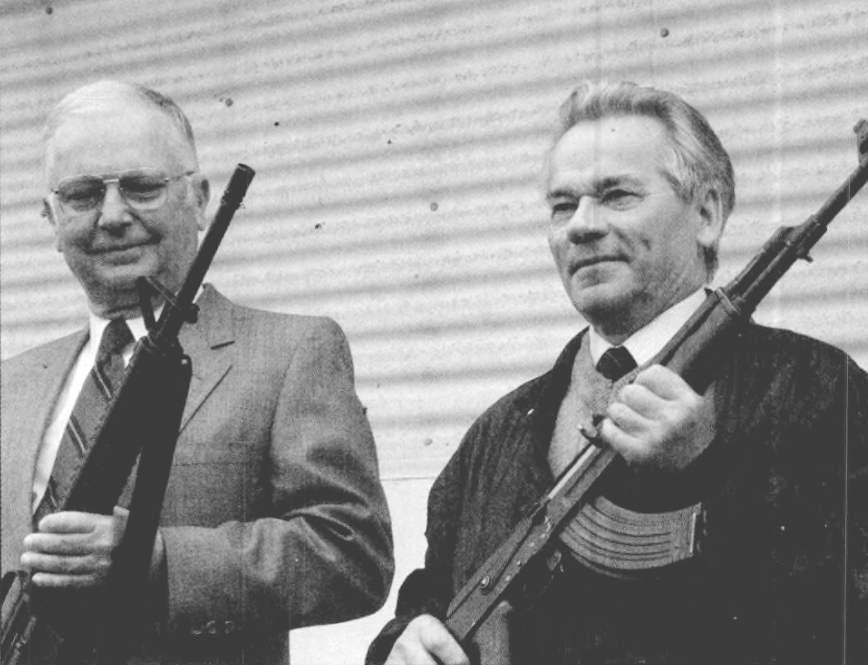
Eugene Stoner (left) with Mikhail Kalashnikov (right).

TRW's requirements for the 25mm project were that the gun had to be fully automatic and actively locked, be operated by gas, have a rotating bolt head and use a dual-belt selective feed system allowing a quick and easy switch between different ammunition types. In parallel Oerlikon-Bührle assumed responsibility for developing the new 25x137mm ammunition and the interior ballistics of the TRW-6425.

The first prototype was produced in 22 months and began test firing in November 1965 from an Ml 14 vehicle. In December the prototype was fired from an Austrian Armored Personnel Carrier. An early version was tested by a number of countries including Great Britain and France. At the beginning of 1967, technical tests and firing trials were carried out with two TRW-6425 prototype cannons followed by the first demonstrations for a NATO country.

In the meantime the Swiss Oerlikon-Bürle factory obtained the European license for the TRW-6425 from TRW in 1967, and started the "KBA series" 25mm cannon project based on it. In the designation KBA, "K" stands for Kanone (gun), "B" indicates 25mm caliber and "A" is the design model in a given caliber. Several principles were combined in order to refine the project.

At least six models of the TRW-6425 automatic cannons were built. The early configuration was tested several times at Aberdeen Proving Ground, included was a Military Potential Test from March 1968 to March 1969. Before the U.S. tests were completed the US Army paused the new IFV project due to the Vietnam War situation. At the end of 1969 TRW ceased work on the TRW 6425 cannon. In 1970 the Jet and Ordnance Division of TRW Inc. was closed and Stoner, together with Robert Bihun, launched ARES Inc. As ARES Inc. quickly outgrew Stoner's garage, they moved the company into the same buildings previously used by TRW Inc. and hired many of their former employees.

Following the closure of the TRW Jet and Ordnance Division, the Philco-Ford company's Aeronutronic Division became interested in the TRW-6425 cannon project, bought the rights to the project and began work on the weapon.

When the Bushmaster project—full name U.S. Army Vehicle Rapid Fire Weapons System (Bushmaster)—was restarted, the PFB-25 (Philco-Ford Bushmaster 25mm) was selected as one of the self-powered gun candidates. Since then, Philco-Ford has further developed the PFB-25.

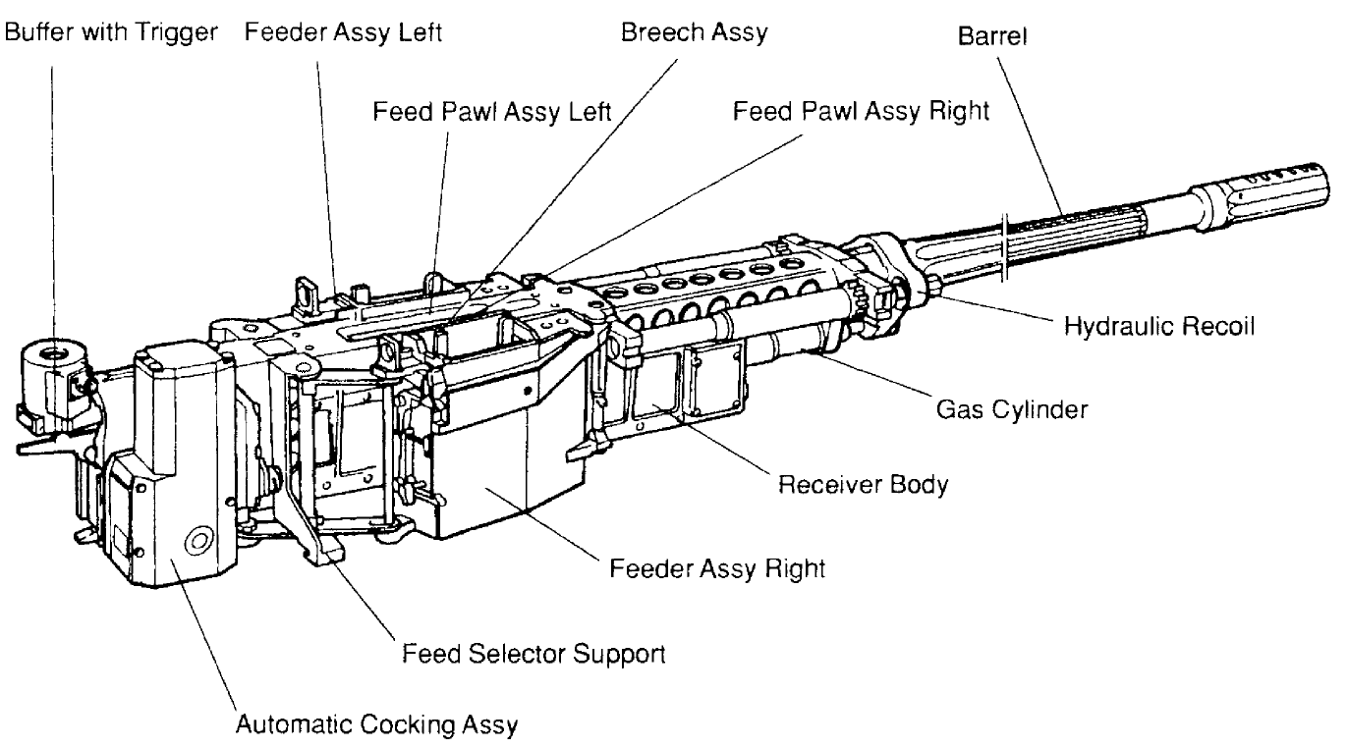
Oerlikon KBA 25mm Part Description

During the trials, the original American PFB-25 prototypes displayed a number of basic functional deficiencies. This prompted Oerlikon to undertake further development work on the KBA. Oerlikon extensively reworked the original American TRW 6425 design. Perhaps the only remaining elements of the original design in the KBA were the 25x137 mm cartridge and the method of blocking the chamber by turning the bolt (a novelty for Oerlikon development, earlier Oerlikon systems having sliding bolts with locking lugs). Eugene Stoner's classic automatic gas valve drive from the TRW-6425 cannon was also comprehensively changed. The resulting modifications added functional reliability that allowed the trials to be completed successfully in 1970. When the first prototype KBA cannons became available, suitable gun turrets had also to be provided.

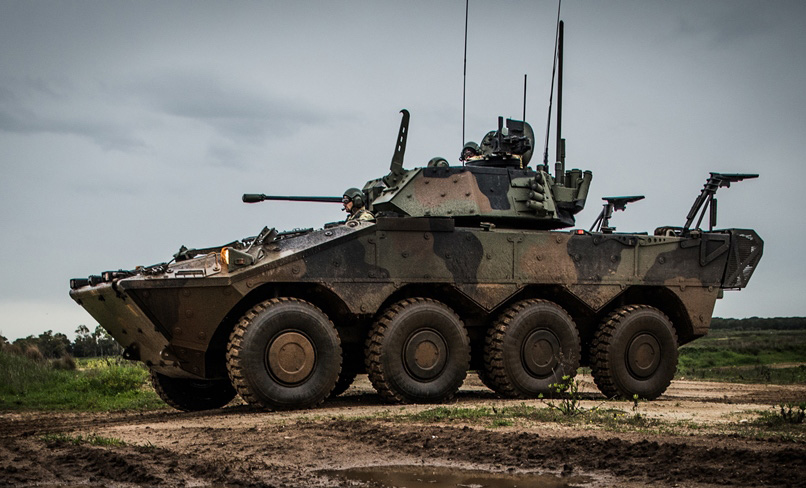
Oerlikon KBA on VBM Freccia in use by the Italian Army.

The complete system—cannon, hand-driven turret, and ammunition—underwent detailed firing trials between 1969 and 1971.

Oerlikon devoted huge development efforts to improve the functional reliability, durability, and firing precision of the KBA autocannon. In 1971 sufficient progress had been made for the weapon system to fulfill the strict specifications laid down and for large-scale deliveries to the Netherlands to begin.

In 1977, due to an internal decision, the US Army selected the externally-powered Hughes M242 from the Hughes Helicopters Ordnance Division as the Bushmaster. The M242 became the autocannon for the Army's new IFV.

Within the framework of their product support service, Oerlikon regularly improves the gun and ammunition and adapts them to the latest requirements. An important step forward was made in 1982/83 when the range at which the 25 mm APDS-T (sub-caliber) round achieves its specified performance was increased by 150% from 1000 m to 2500 m.

== Ammunition ==
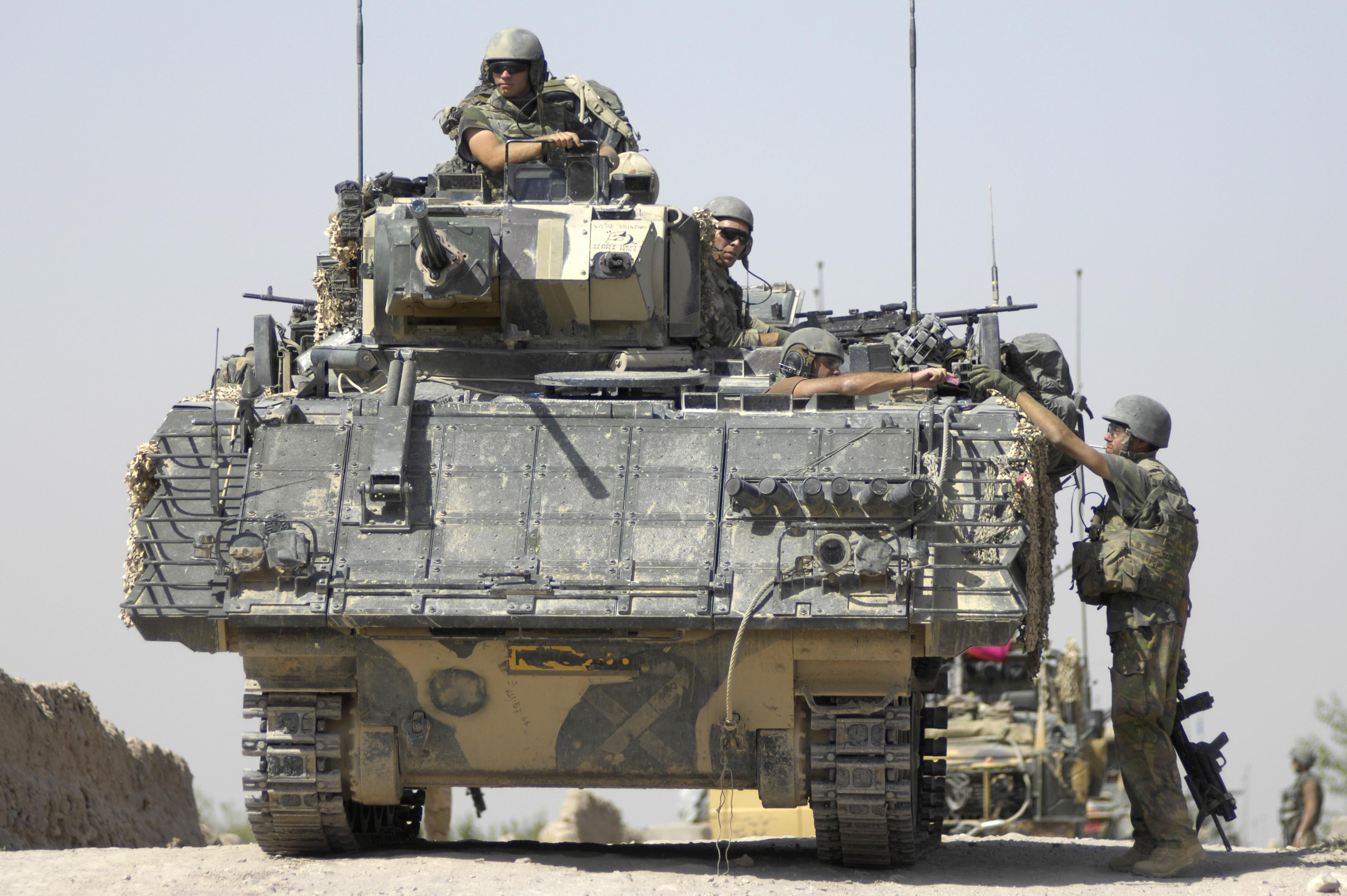
KBA 25mm on Dutch YPR-765 in Afghanistan

A wide range of ammunition has been developed for this weapon specifically developed to engage and defeat both ground and air targets. The ammunition complies with all handling and operational safety requirements according to MIL-STD's, and was subjected to intensive trials by NATO member countries prior to its introduction and standardization as NATO 25mmx137 ammunition.

The current 25x137mm ammunition family consists of different combat (air-ground) and training round types as follow:

- HE-PX: High Explosive, Proximity Fuze with controlled fragmentation, for C-UAS application.
- APFSDS-T: Armour-Piercing Fin Stabilized Discarding Sabot with tracer, for use against armoured ground targets;
- APDS-T: Armour-Piercing Discarding Sabot with tracer, for use against armoured ground targets;
- FAPDS-T: Frangible Armour-Piercing Discarding Sabot with tracer, for use against air, ground and urban targets;
- SAPHEI-T: Semi-Armour-Piercing High Explosive Incendiary with tracer, for use against well protected targets;
- PELE: Penetrator with Enhanced Lateral Effect, for use against armoured ground targets without explosive charge;
- PELE-PEN: Penetrator with Enhanced Lateral Effect with Penetrator, for use against armoured ground targets without explosive charge;
- HEIAP: High Explosive Incendiary and Armor-Piercing, for use against armoured ground targets;
- HEI-T: High Explosive Incendiary with tracer, for use against lightly protected targets;
- HE-T: High Explosive with tracer, for use against lightly protected targets;
- MP-T: Multipurpose with tracer, designed to defeat a broad range of targets from soft skinned to armored target and building constructions;
- TPDS-T: Target Practice Discarding Sabot with tracer, a short range trainer for the above sub-calibre types;
- TP-T: Target Practice with tracer, used for training.

== Mounting and weapon stations ==
These are the characteristics of the best-known KBA autocannon weapons stations in use and presently in production:

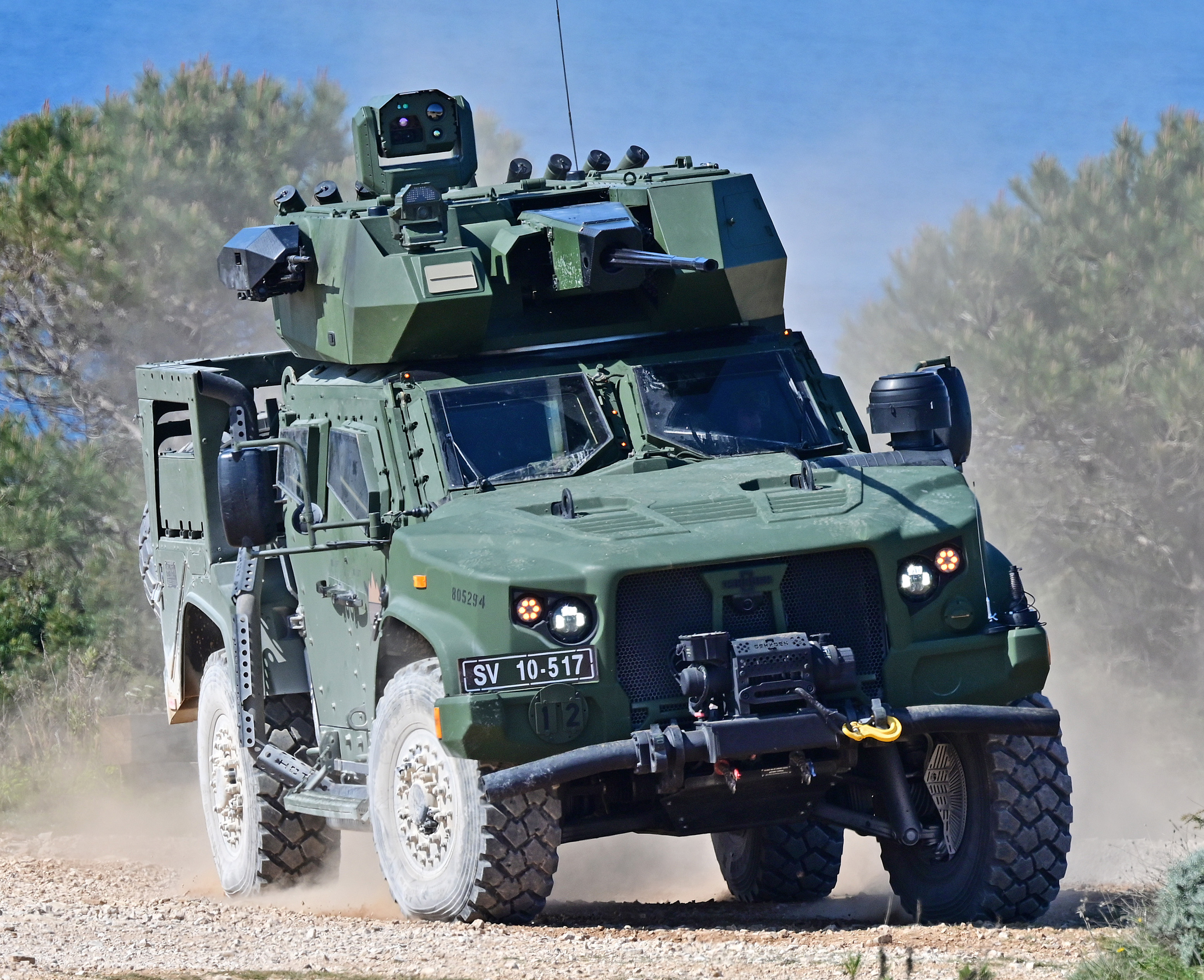
Valhalla MANGART 25 turret with 25mm Rheinmetall KBA

=== Valhalla ===
Valhalla's MANGART 25 is a remote controlled SHORAD / multi-functional turret, designed for integration with modern wheeled or tracked armoured fighting vehicles. The MANGART 25 turret is designed to mount a 25mm Rheinmetall KBA (25x137mm) autocannon paired with a high-performance electro–optic system (cooled and un-cooled) and a co-axial machine gun provides fire support for the main cannon.

=== Aselsan ===
The Aselsan STOP System is a turret system with Oerlikon KBA developed to be used against close and asymmetric threats on warships, coast guard boats, landing ships and other ships in order to contribute to increasing the defense capabilities of modern armies. It is included in a group of the Stabilized Machine Gun Platform (STAMP) System in the family of Stabilized Weapon Systems.

The Aselsan NEFER-L is a remote controlled weapon station (RCWS) can be mounted on 4x4, 6x6 and 8x8 wheeled or tracked vehicles and is developed primarily for use against armored land targets. At the side of the main cannon a co-axial machine gun like 7,62mm provides fire support to the Oerlikon KBA.

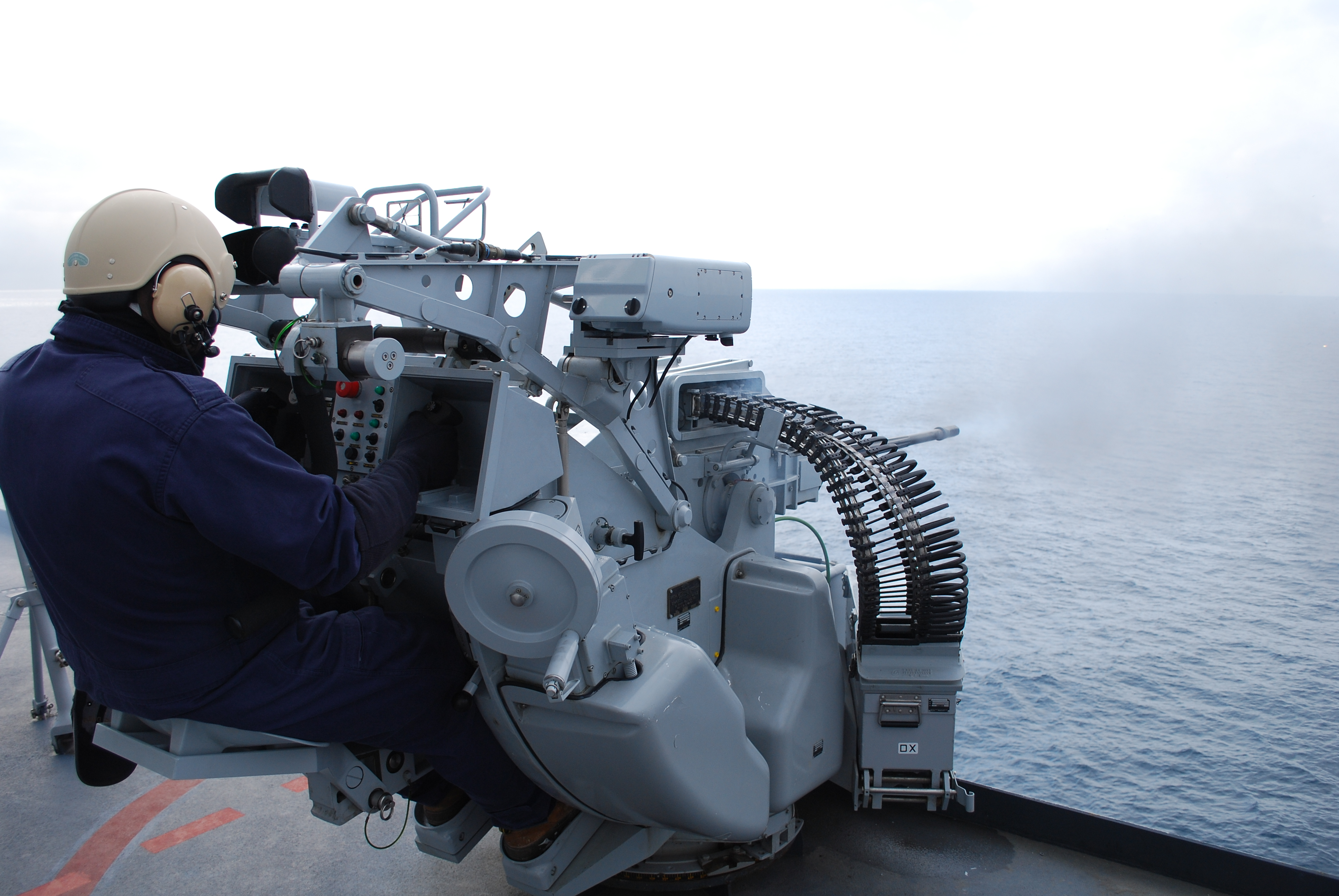
OTO Melara 25/80 with Oerlikon KBA 25mm (manned configuration).

=== Leonardo ===
OTO Melara (today Leonardo) has developed a two-man turret for armored vehicles called Hitfist.. The turret is designed to mount a 25mm Oerlikon KBA or a 30mm ATK Mk44 autocannon. The main armament may mount a co-axial machine gun, a variant allows the operator to aim and fire anti-tank missiles. Current operators includes Italy, Poland and Romania.

OTO Melara has also developed the OTO Single 25mm KBA as a stabilized, electric servo-drive assisted weapon station, for naval applications, with 252 ready-to-fire rounds. It is made to neutralize targets in Anti-Surface Warfare, particularly in Asymmetric Warfare or Mine Defence scenarios, and thanks to the high rate of fire of the 25mm KBA cannon it also offers a capability in very close Anti-Air Defense. The OTO Single 25mm KBA turret is available in both unmanned and manned configurations.

=== Others ===
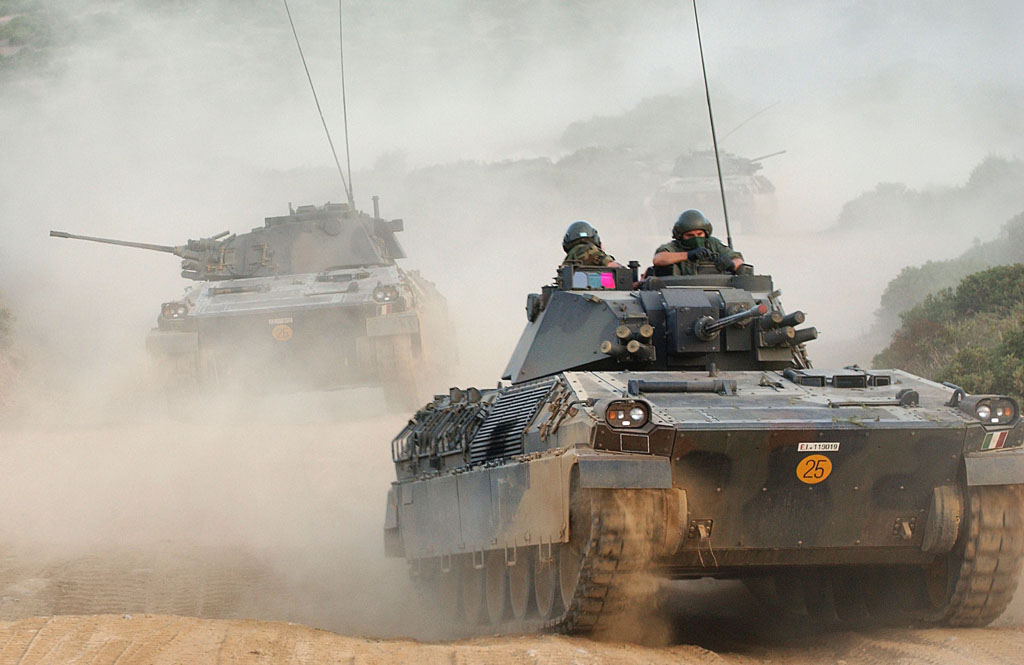
Dardo IFV of Italian Army with Oerlikon KBA

The KBA 25mm Automatic Cannon is also installed in many other weapon station designs produced by different defense companies, here below a list of the most prominent:

- Rheinmetall CT-025
- FMC Turret Type EWS turret (e.g. in the YPR-765);
- Israeli OWS-25R turret (e.g. in the MLI-84);
- Lamborghini LM002 with KBA 25;
- OTO Quadruple Gun turret (e.g. in the SIDAM 25);
- OTO T25S / T25 turrets (in the VCC-Dardo);
- OTO Spallaccia 25mm;
- Oerlikon GBD-ADA turret;
- Type 87 RCV turret.

== Operators ==
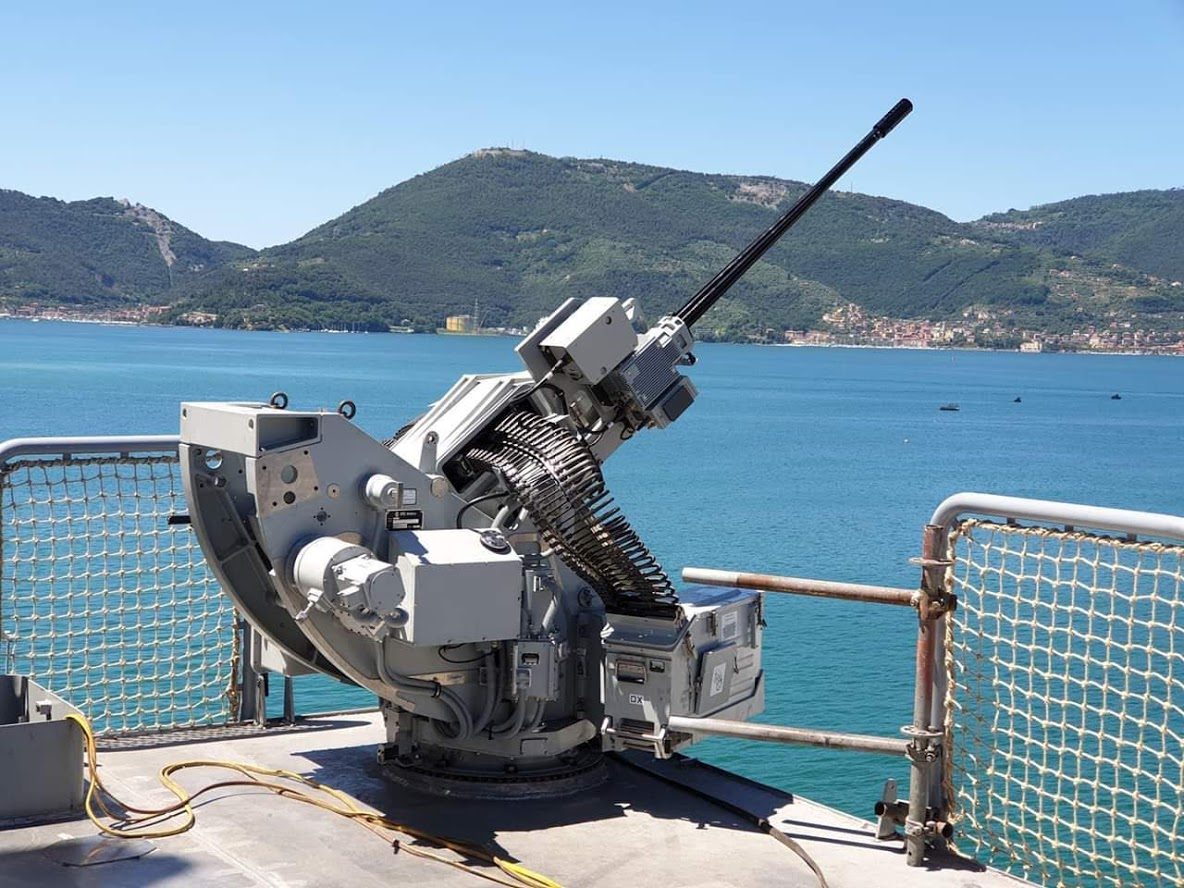
LEONARDO 25/80 with Oerlikon KBA 25mm unmanned configuration (RCVS)

=== Current operators ===
==== Land use ====
Bahrain
The Royal Bahraini Army uses it with:
- AIFV-25

Chile
The Chilean Army uses it with:
- AIFV-25

Egypt
The Egyptian Army uses it with:
- YPR-765

Italy
The Italian Army uses it with:
- IFV Freccia (infantry fighting vehicle with Hitfist turret)
- VBM Freccia EVO iFV (infantry fighting vehicle with Hitfist turret)
- IFV Dardo (infantry fighting vehicle)

Japan
The Japan Self-Defense Forces use it with:
- Type 87 RCV - Reconnaissance and Patrol Vehicle

Jordan
The Royal Jordanian Army uses it with:
- YPR-765

Lebanon
The Lebanese Armed Forces use it with:
- AIFV-25

Morocco
The Moroccan Army uses it with:
- AIFV-25

Philippines
The Philippine Army uses it with:
- AIFV-25

Romania
The Romanian Armed Forces use it with:
- MLI-84 (infantry fighting vehicle)

Turkey
The Turkish Army uses it with:
- ACV-300
- Ejder Yalçın with Aselsan NEFER-L turret

==== Naval use ====
Albania
The Albanian Navy uses it with:
- Cassiopea-class patrol vessel
  - Libra (P133)

Algeria
Kalaat Béni Abbès - Amphibious transport dock

Bangladesh
The Bangladesh Coast Guard uses it with the classes:
- Leader class (offshore patrol vessel)
- Sobuj Bangla class (inshore patrol vessel)

Cyprus
The Cyprus Navy uses it with:
- FPB Class:
  - Lieutenant Eleftherios Tsomakis (P03)
  - Lieutenant Commander Nikolas Georgiou (P04)

Egypt
The Egyptian Navy uses it with:
- FREMM class:
  - ENS Al-Galala (FFG-1002)
  - ENS Bernees (FFG-1003)

Indonesia
The Indonesian Navy uses it with:
- Brawijaya class class (oceanic OPV)
  - KRI Brawijaya (320)
  - KRI Prabu Siliwangi (321)

Italy
The Italian Navy uses it with:
- Trieste (L9890) (aircraft carrier / LHD)
- Cavour (550) (aircraft carrier V/STOL)
- San Giorgio class (landing platform dock)
- Bergamini class (FREMM) (general-purpose frigates and anti-submarine frigates)
- Orizzonte class (air-defence destroyer)
- Thaon di Revel class (oceanic OPV)
- Comandanti class (OPV)
- Cassiopea class (OPV)
- Sirio class (OPV)
- Vulcano class (logistic support ship)
- Etna class (AOR – replenishment oiler)
- Stromboli class (AOR – replenishment oiler)
- Elettra vessel (SIGINT, electronic surveillance ship)
The Italian Coast Guard uses it with:
- Diciotti class (OPV)

Malta
The Maritime Squadron of the Armed Forces of Malta uses it with:
- Diciotti class P61 (OPV)
- OPV748 class
  - Offshore Patrol Vessel P71 ( OTO SINGLE 25mm)

Pakistan
The Pakistani Navy uses it with:
- Moawin vessel (replenishment oiler, equipped with ASELSAN STOP)
- Babur-class corvette (equipped with ASELSAN STOP)

Turkey
The Turkish Naval Forces use it with:
- TCG Anadolu (aircraft carrier / LHD, equipped with ASELSAN STOP)

Turkmenistan
The Turkmen Naval Forces use it with:
- C92 Deniz Han class (corvette, equipped with ASELSAN STOP)

=== Potential operators ===
==== Land use ====
Germany (274)
Luchs 2 Spähfahrzeug Next Generation (next generation reconnaissance vehicle), successor of the Fennek for the German Army, based on a Piranha V 6×6. The weapon will be the Oerlikon KBA.
274 Luchs 2 will be ordered in October 2025, with an option for 82 vehicles. As part of the firm order, 310 cannons will be ordered to Rheinmetall.

=== Former operators ===
==== Land use ====
Belgium
AIFV-B-C25 with Oerlikon KBA-B02 cannon

Italy
The Italian Army used it with:
- SIDAM 25 - Self-propelled anti-aircraft system (decommissioned)

Netherlands
YPR-765 pri (IFV)

==== Naval use ====
Italy
The Italian Navy used it with:
- Minerva class (corvette)
