= TCG Istanbul (F 515) =

Istanbul-class frigate of the Turkish Navy

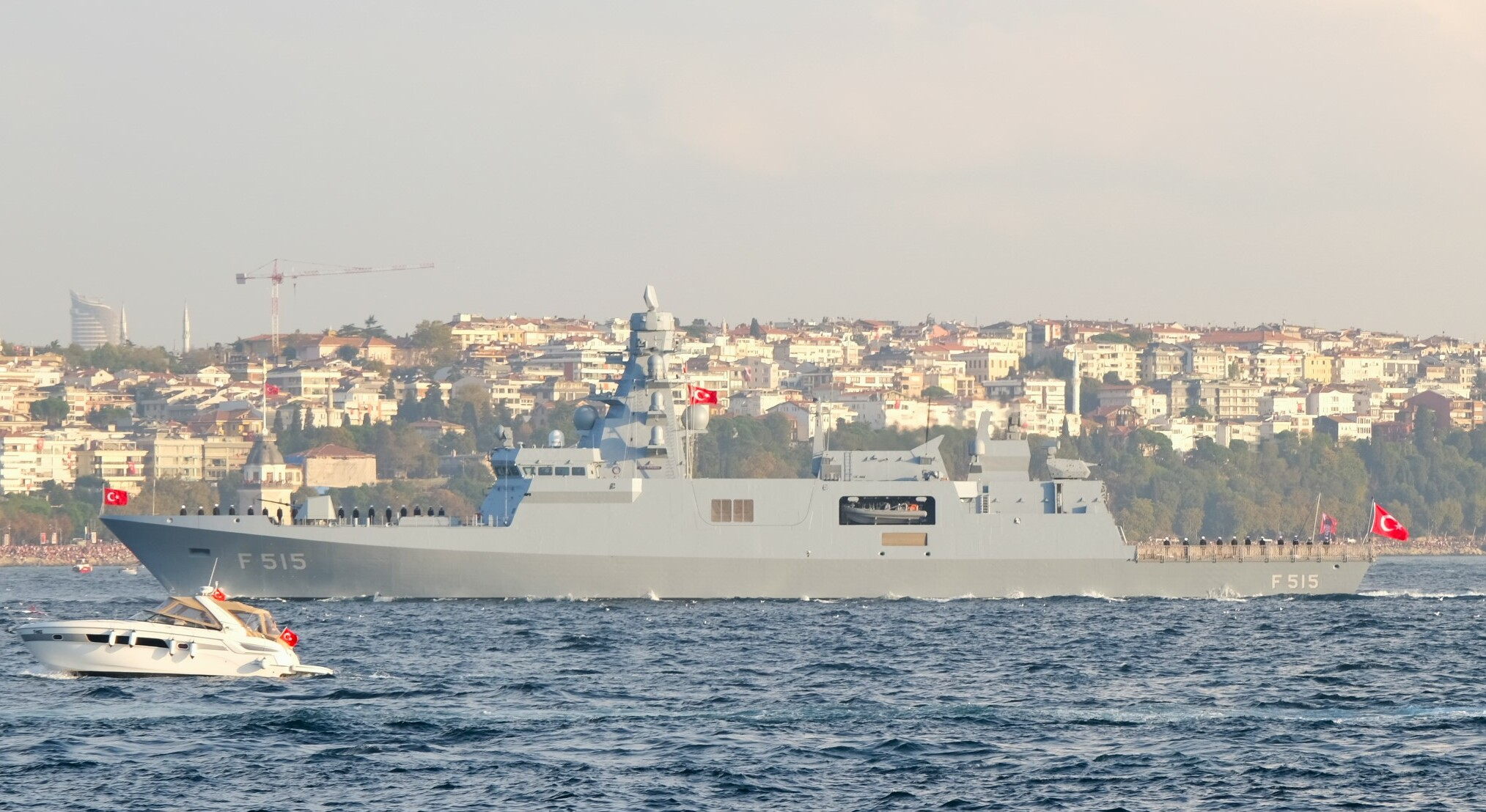
- TCG Istanbul (F-515) at the Bosporus strait, during the naval parade for celebrating the centennial of the Turkish Republic, October 29, 2023.

History

Turkey
- Name: Istanbul; (İstanbul)
- Namesake: Istanbul
- Builder: Pendik, Istanbul
- Laid down: 19 January 2017
- Launched: 23 January 2021
- Sponsored by: Şule Akar
- Commissioned: 19 January 2024
- Identification: Pennant number: F 515
- Status: in active service

General characteristics
- Class & type: Istanbul-class frigate
- Displacement: 3,100 tonnes
- Length: 113.2 m (371 ft 5 in)
- Beam: 14.40 m (47 ft 3 in)
- Draft: 4.05 m (13 ft 3 in)
- Propulsion: 1 gas turbine, 2 diesels, 2 shafts
- Speed: Economy: 14 kn (26 km/h; 16 mph); Maximum: 29 kn (54 km/h; 33 mph)
- Range: 6,570 nmi (12,170 km; 7,560 mi) at 14 kn (26 km/h; 16 mph)
- Boats & landing craft carried: 2 x RHIB
- Complement: 125
- Sensors & processing systems: 3D search radar; ASELSAN ALPER LPI Surface Radar; AKREP (AKR-D Block B-1/2) Fire Control Radar; Sonar; Combat Management System: GENESIS ADVENT
- Electronic warfare & decoys: ESM: ASELSAN ARES 2N; ECM: AREAS 2C; Decoy: Aselsan HIZIR Torpedo countermeasures system
- Armament: Guns: 1 × 76 mm (3 in) OTO Melara Super Rapid main gun; 1 × 35 mm (1.4 in) Aselsan GOKDENIZ dual barreled CIWS; 2 × 25 mm (0.98 in) Aselsan STOP autocannon; Anti-ship missiles: 16 × Atmaca; Vertical launching system: 16-cell (total 16 missiles) MiDLAS vertical launching system: HISAR Surface-to-air missile; Torpedoes: 2 × 324 mm (13 in) Double Torpedo launchers
- Aircraft carried: S-70B Seahawk ASW helicopter; Unmanned aerial vehicles (UAV)
- Aviation facilities: Hangar and helipad

Istanbul (F 515) is an Istanbul-class frigate of the Turkish Navy.

== Construction and career ==
Istanbul was laid down on 19 January 2017 in which the ceremony was attended by Turkish Defence Minister Fikri Işık and senior military officers, including Admiral Bülent Bostanoğlu, Commander of the Turkish Naval Forces. She was launched on 23 January 2021 by Pendik Naval Shipyard in Istanbul. She was commissioned on 19 January 2024.
