= PGZ-95 =

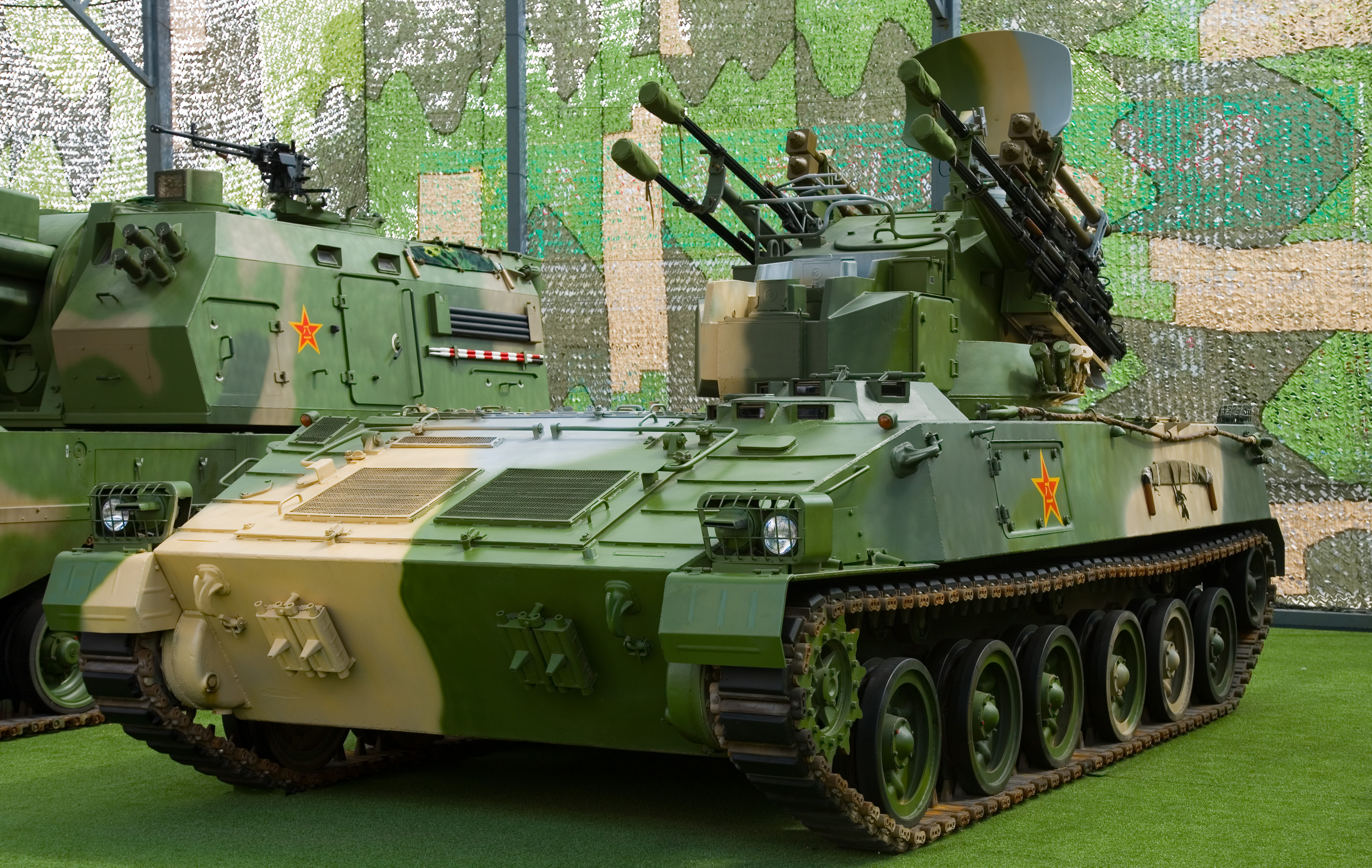
- A Type 95 SPAAA vehicle on display at the China People's Revolution Military Museum during the "Our troops towards the sun" exhibition
- Type: Self-propelled anti-aircraft gun/missile system
- Place of origin: China

Service history
- In service: 1999-present

Production history
- Designer: Northwest Institute of Mechanical & Electrical Engineering
- Manufacturer: Norinco
- Produced: 1999–present

Specifications
- Mass: 22.5 tons
- Length: 6.71 m (20 ft)
- Width: 3.2 m (10 ft 6 in)
- Height: 3.4 m (11 ft 2 in) (radar down); 4.82 m (15 ft 10 in) (radar up)
- Crew: 3
- Main armament: 4 × 25 mm Type 87 autocannon; 4 × QW-2 or FN-6 missile
- Engine: diesel
- Suspension: torsion bar
- Operational range: 450 km (280 mi)
- Maximum speed: 53 km/h (33 mph)

The PGZ-95 (Chinese: 95式自行高射炮; pinyin: 95 shi zixing gaoshepao, Type 95 self-propelled anti-aircraft artillery) is a Chinese self-propelled anti-aircraft vehicle. It is armed with four 25 mm caliber cannons and optionally four fire-and-forget QW-2 infrared homing missiles. It was first displayed publicly at the Beijing Military Parade in 1999. Earlier in development the system was designated Type 90-II and Type 90-III.

== Design ==
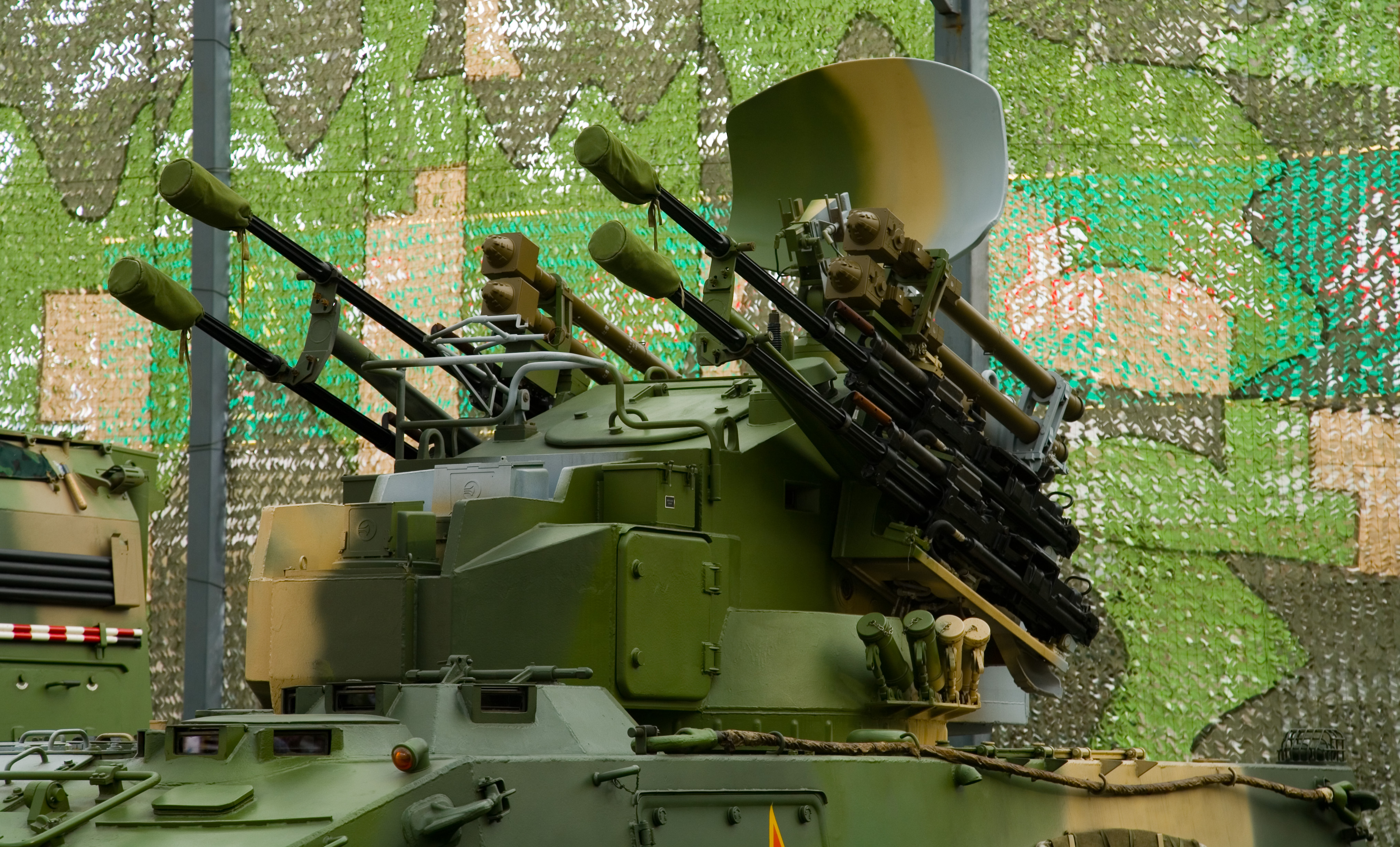
Detail of the turret. Note the four FN-6 missiles in position above the 25mm guns.

The vehicle uses a tracked armored chassis with six road wheels, a drive sprocket, an idler and three return rollers on each side. The vehicle has a crew of three: driver, commander, and gunner. The engine is located at the front of vehicle, with the driver sitting on the left side. The driver is provided with a hatch and three vision blocks for visibility when buttoned up. Behind the driver sits the commander, who is provided with a raised hatch, also fitted with three vision blocks. Towards the rear of the hull is the large powered one-man turret. A door to the weapon control station is located in the rear of the hull.

Mounted on the front of the turret in an armored box is the electro-optical tracking equipment which consists of a TV tracking camera, and infra-red tracking camera and a laser rangefinder. The tracking cameras have a day range of approximately 6,000 meters and a night range of 5,000 meters. The laser rangefinder has a range of between 500 and 5,500 meters with an accuracy of 5 meters. Mounted on either side of the turret are two 25 millimeter Type 87 25x183mmB gas-operated cannons. It shares the same ammunition with the ZPT-90 autocannon mounted on the infantry fighting vehicle variant of the WZ-551, and the cartridge itself is a bored-out and longer-cased derivative of the 2A14's 23x152mmB cartridge. The cannons have a rate of fire of 600–800 rpm each, eject spent shell casings to either side of the vehicle. About 1,000 rounds are carried. The cannons are used to engage targets out to a range of 2,500 meters and at altitudes of up to 2,000 meters. Additionally two QW-2 infra-red homing missiles can be mounted above the cannons on each side. The QW-2 missiles are based on a shoulder-launched missile and can engage targets flying between 10 and 3,500 meters in altitude at a slant range of between 500 and 6,000 meters, but has to be manually reloaded which is known to take about 2.45 minutes. To the rear of the turret is the CLC-1 S-band pulse-doppler search radar which has a reported range of 11 kilometers, and is optimized to detect low-flying targets. Finally, an array of four electrically fired smoke grenades are mounted on either side of the turret, aimed to fire forward and to either side of the vehicle. The system can automatically optically track targets and provide the gunner with an alert when the target is within range. The gunner can also manually aim the guns, using either the optical system or an external backup ring sight provided on the outside of the turret. The system has a reaction time of around 10 seconds when in radar search mode, and six seconds in optical mode. The vehicle also provides a simulator function for training.

A battery control vehicle using the same chassis is also built. It has a crew of five people. It uses a S-band CLC-2 surveillance radar with a maximum range of 45 kilometers and a maximum altitude of 4,500 meters. The communication system in the vehicle allows it to communicate digitally to a range of up to 5 kilometers and via a normal radio link up to 15 kilometers. Additionally it can use signal wire to communicate up to 500 meters. An Auxiliary Power Unit (APU) provides power for the electronics. A single 12.7 mm heavy machine gun is provided for self-defense.

A typical Type 95 battery consists of six SPAAA vehicles, and a single command vehicle. Additionally, three ammunition re-supply trucks, a test/repair truck and a power supply truck support each battery.

== Variants ==
PGZ-95
Baseline model, equipped with QW-2 infrared homing missile.
PGZ-04/A
Improved model with lengthened chassis, better integration with the battery command, and longer-range FN-6 infrared homing missile.
PGZ-95 battery vehicle
Command and control variant.

== Operators ==
China: People's Liberation Army Ground Force — approximately 270 units

== See also ==
- Type 09 SPAAA – (China) - the successor of Type 95
- 2K22 Tunguska – (Soviet Union)
- ZSU-23-4 Shilka – (Soviet Union)
- Type 87 Self-Propelled Anti-Aircraft Gun – (Japan)
- SIDAM 25 – (Italy)
- Flakpanzer Gepard – (West Germany)
