= AIFV =

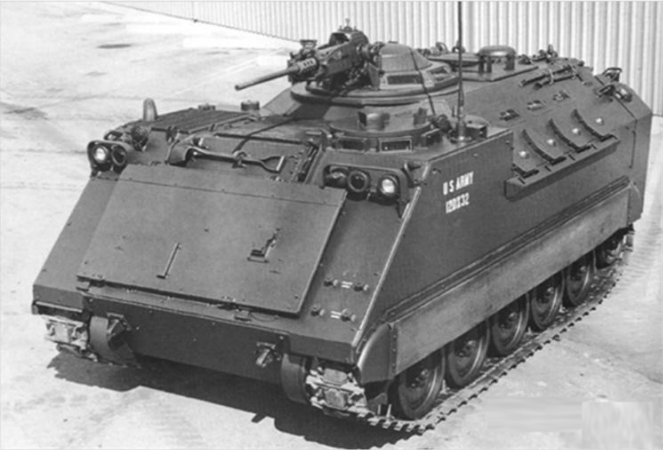
- XM765 MICV-65 Prototype
- Type: Infantry fighting vehicle
- Place of origin: United States

Service history
- Used by: Operators
- Wars: 1989 Philippine coup d'état attempt Yugoslav Wars; War in Afghanistan; Syrian Civil War; Battle of Marawi; Sinai insurgency Russo-Ukrainian War: Russian invasion of Ukraine

Production history
- Variants: Variants

Specifications
- Mass: 13.6 metric tons (combat load)
- Length: 5.26 m
- Width: 2.82 m
- Height: 2.62 m (to turret roof)
- Crew: 3+7
- Armor: Aluminum hull with spaced laminate steel appliqué armor on the front and sides
- Main armament: 25 mm KBA-B02 cannon (180 rounds ready; 144 in reserve)
- Secondary armament: 7.62×51mm NATO machine gun (230 rounds ready; 1,610 in reserve)
- Engine: Detroit Diesel Allison 6V-53T; 267 hp (195 kW) at 2800 rpm
- Power/weight: 19.29 hp/t
- Transmission: TX100-1A
- Suspension: Torsion bar in tube
- Operational range: 490 km (300 mi)
- Maximum speed: 61 km/h (38 mph)

The AIFV (Armored Infantry Fighting Vehicle) is an American tracked light armored vehicle that serves as an infantry fighting vehicle (IFV) in the armies of several countries, though the U.S. military never operated it. It is a development of the M113A1 armored personnel carrier.

== History ==
In 1967, funded by the United States Army, the FMC Corporation produced two prototype vehicles designated as XM765 – these were based on their experiences with the earlier XM734 vehicle, developed for the MICV-65 program. The XM765 was based on the M113A1, upgraded with an enclosed turret and firing ports, so that the infantry could fight from within the vehicle. The Army evaluated the vehicle, but decided that they wanted a better protected and more mobile vehicle, selecting instead the M2 Bradley.

FMC continued development as a private venture, resulting in the product improved (PI) M113A1 in 1970. The PI M113A1 had the driver and engine at the front, with an enclosed weapon station in the center of the hull and the commander seated at the rear. This arrangement meant that the commander had a very poor forward view. FMC went back to the drawing board and came up with a new design, which had the driver on the front left of the hull and the commander seated behind him. To the right of the commander was a one-man turret. The vehicle would later be designated the AIFV (armored infantry fighting vehicle).

== Export ==
While the US was uninterested in the design, a number of other governments were interested in the vehicle, which was simpler, lighter, and cheaper than the Bradley.

=== Netherlands ===
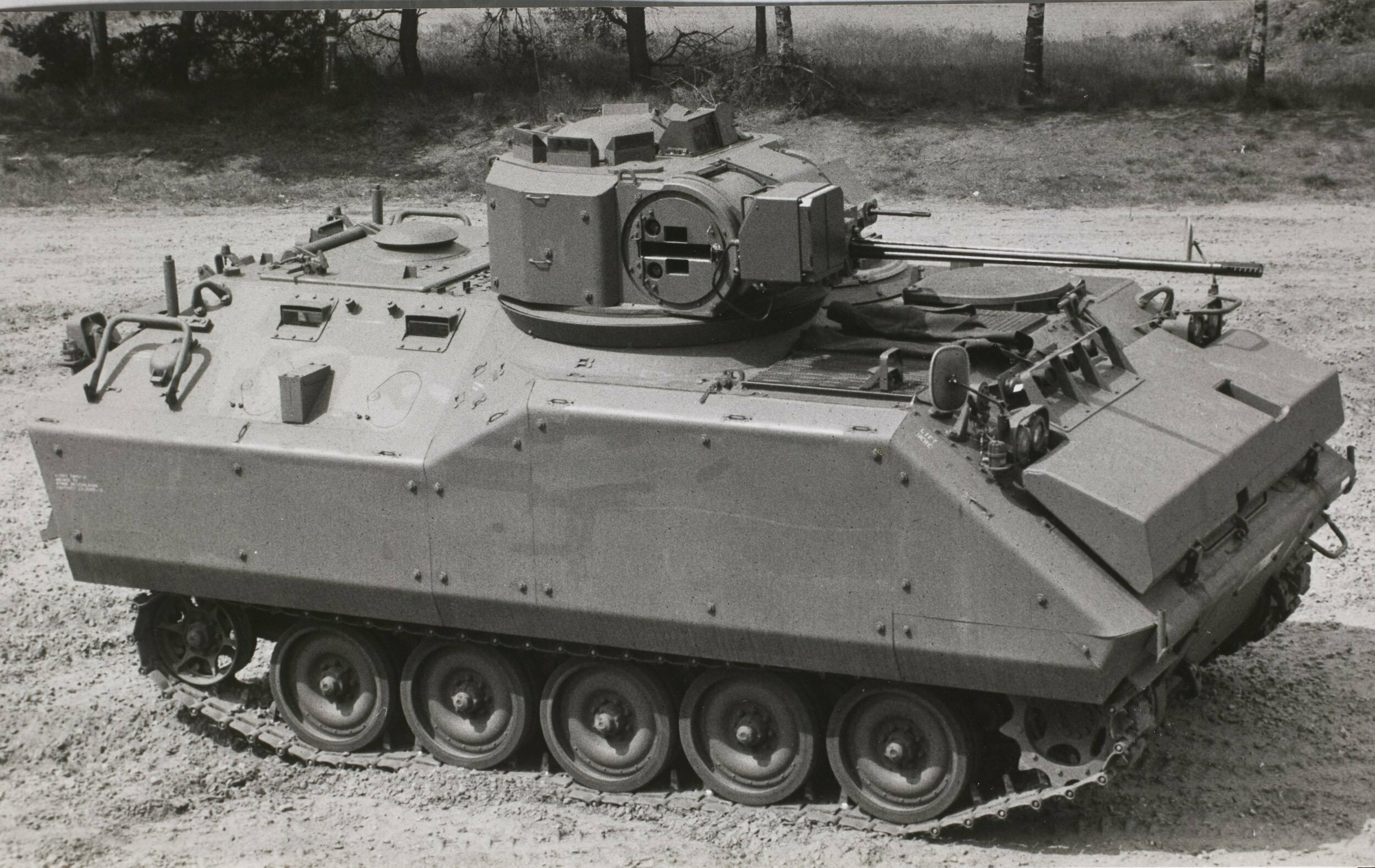
Early Dutch YPR-765 PRI variant armed with a turreted Oerlikon KBA 25 mm cannon and infrared searchlight.

After a series of demonstrations and the delivery of four evaluation vehicles in 1974, the Netherlands government placed an order for 880 of the vehicles in 1975, which were designated YPR-765 when they entered service. Some changes were made at the request of the Dutch government, including shifting the weapon station to the right side and moving the commander behind the driver. The Netherlands ordered 2,079, of which 815 were produced locally under license. Under the YPR-2000 program, virtually all Dutch vehicles were upgraded to YPR-765A1 standard and are easily identified by the 3-tone NATO camouflage pattern. During the war in Afghanistan, several vehicles were fitted with additional armor.

=== Philippines ===
The Philippines also received 45 vehicles in 1979, these were intended to take 25mm cannons, although some were later modified to fit 12.7mm machine guns.

=== Belgium ===
In 1979, Belgium placed an order for 514 AIFV-B (to be produced locally) along with 525 M113A-B (similar to the M113A2). The first vehicles were delivered in 1982.

=== Turkey ===
Turkey selected the AIFV in 1989, after a competition involving the Alvis Vickers Warrior IFV, Krauss-Maffei PUMA and United Defense LP Armoured Infantry Fighting Vehicle. The total value of the contract for 1,698 vehicles was US$1.076 billion. The first 285 hulls were produced in Belgium, the remaining vehicles were produced entirely in Turkey. A little way into the production run, with 200 vehicles completed, the Turkish AIFV specification was updated to include a more powerful powerpack developing 300 horsepower, an Allison X-200-4 transmission and hydrostatic steering from the M113A3. During the production run, a number of changes were made to the armament of the vehicle, including different turret packages, and powerpacks.

== Description (per Dutch variant) ==
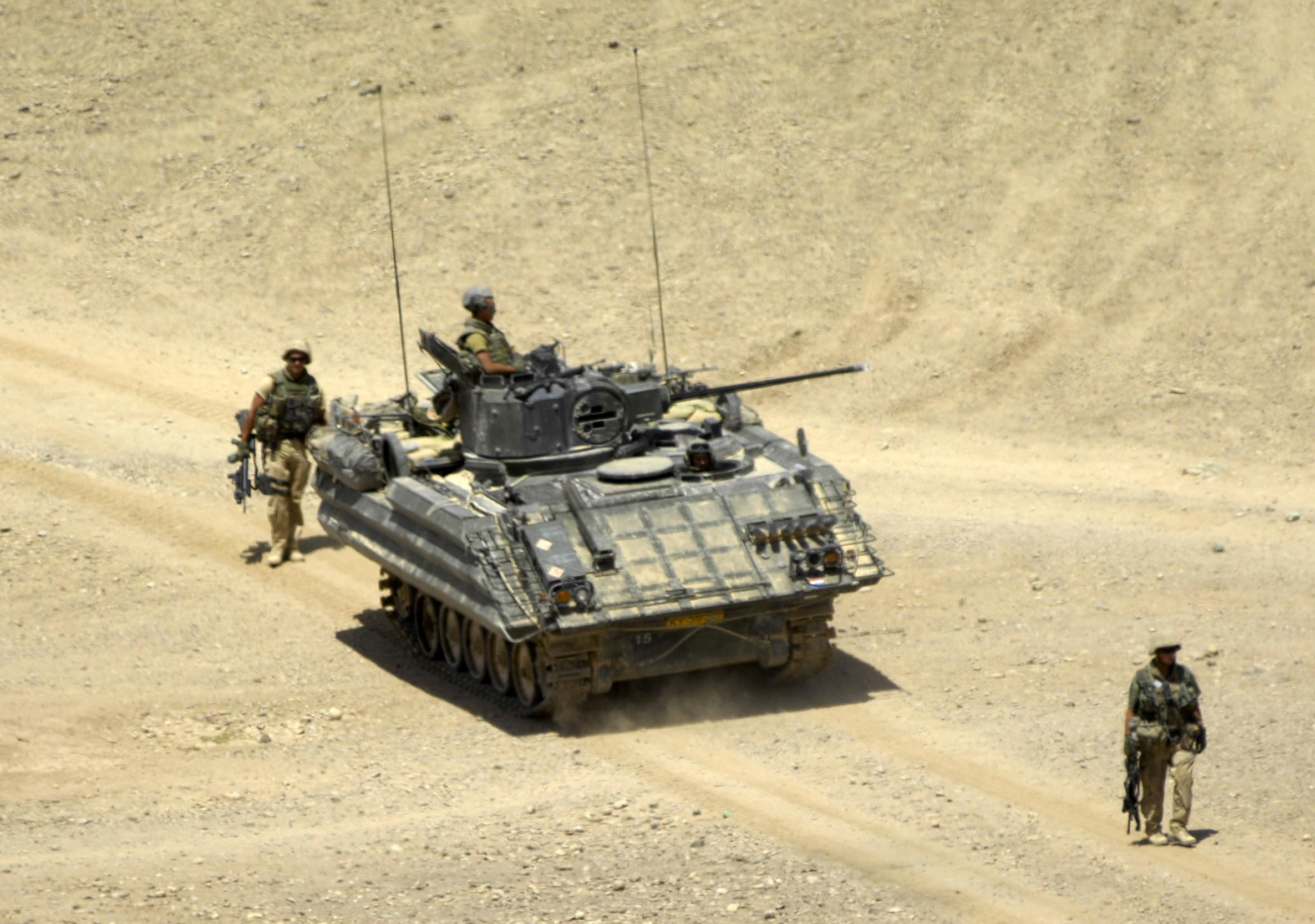
Dutch YPR-765 IFV in Afghanistan with Oerlikon KBA 25mm

The hull of the vehicle is made of welded aluminium, with steel laminate spaced armor bolted onto the side and front. The voids of the armor are filled with polyurethane foam, which gives the vehicle extra buoyancy when travelling in the water. Original production AIFVs can swim without deploying flotation curtains, using only a large front-mounted trim vane; they are propelled in the water by their tracks.

The engine sits on the front right of the hull, behind a hatch that can be used to remove the complete powerpack. The powerpack is similar to the M113A1, except for a larger radiator capacity and turbocharger. The transmission is also fitted with heavy duty components from the M548 tracked cargo carrier. Immediately to the left of the engine is the driver, above whom is a hatch that opens to the right. The driver has four M27 day periscopes. The driver's center periscope can be replaced by a passive infrared periscope for night driving. The commander sits immediately behind the driver, and has a cupola that can be completely traversed. The cupola has five periscopes, four of which are M17 day periscopes, the fifth has 1x to 6x variable magnification.

The turret is fitted on the right side of the hull behind the engine. The turret, which has electro-hydraulic traverse, can elevate from -10 to +50° and can traverse and elevate at a speed of 60°/sec. The turret mounts an Oerlikon KBA 25 mm B02 cannon with a dual ammunition feed and 180 rounds of ready use ammo, with another 144 rounds stored in the hull. Mounted to the left of this gun is a 7.62 mm FN MAG machine gun, which has 230 rounds of ready ammo, with a further 1,610 in the hull. There is a six-barrel smoke discharger mounted at the front, just above the large trim vane.

The troop compartment is at the rear of the hull; a large power operated ramp allows access through the rear of the vehicle, a door is also provided in the ramp. Additionally a single piece hatch covers the top of the troop compartment. The compartment contains seven troops in the Dutch variant, with six sitting back to back facing outwards and a single passenger sitting between the command and the turret facing backwards. There are two firing ports in each side of the hull and a single firing port in the rear. The side firing ports are provided with M17 periscopes, the rear one is fitted with an M27 periscope.

== Variants ==
=== Belgian service variants ===
- AIFV-B — A revised Dutch variant that was fitted with the same suspension as the M113A1-B (similar to the M113A2), an NBC system and a Halon fire suppression system; it entered service in September 1985. Surplus vehicles have been sold to Chile, Indonesia, and the Philippines, with the remaining carriers being phased out in favor of wheeled vehicles.
  - AIFV-B-C25 with a 25 mm Oerlikon KBA-B02 cannon — with smoke grenade launchers fitted on the side of the turret
  - AIFV-B-MILAN with a MILAN anti-tank missile launcher
  - AIFV-B-.50 with a 12.7 mm CWS cupola, two Lyran 71 mm mortars and a pintle mount for a MILAN missile launcher.
  - AIFV-B-CP — command post vehicle with a 12.7 mm cupola (M113 type), a tent, generator and telescopic mast.
  - AIFV-B-TRG — driver training vehicle.

=== Dutch variants ===
Dutch variants: (the pantser-rups designation means armored-tracked)

- YPR-765 PRI (pantser-rups-infanterie) — primary infantry fighting vehicle with a 25 mm Oerlikon KBA-B02 cannon and a coaxial FN MAG machine gun contained in a turret (EWS - Enclosed Weapon Station); crew of three plus seven passengers (normally only five carried); outward-facing bench seats in the rear compartment.
  - YPR-765 PRI.50 — armored personnel carrier with a .50-caliber M2 HB machine gun on an M113-type cupola in place of a turret.

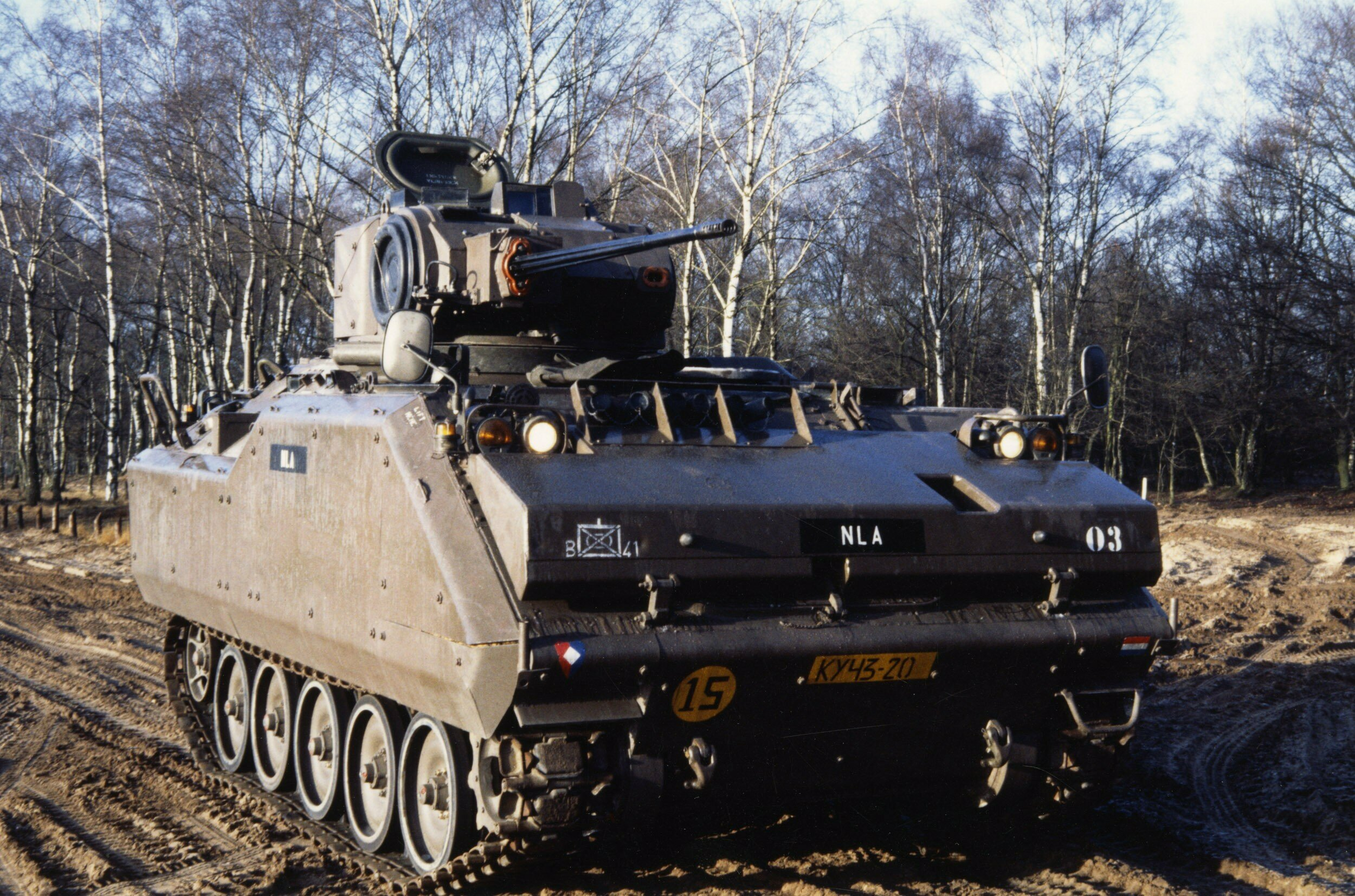
YPR-765 PRCO-B command vehicle.

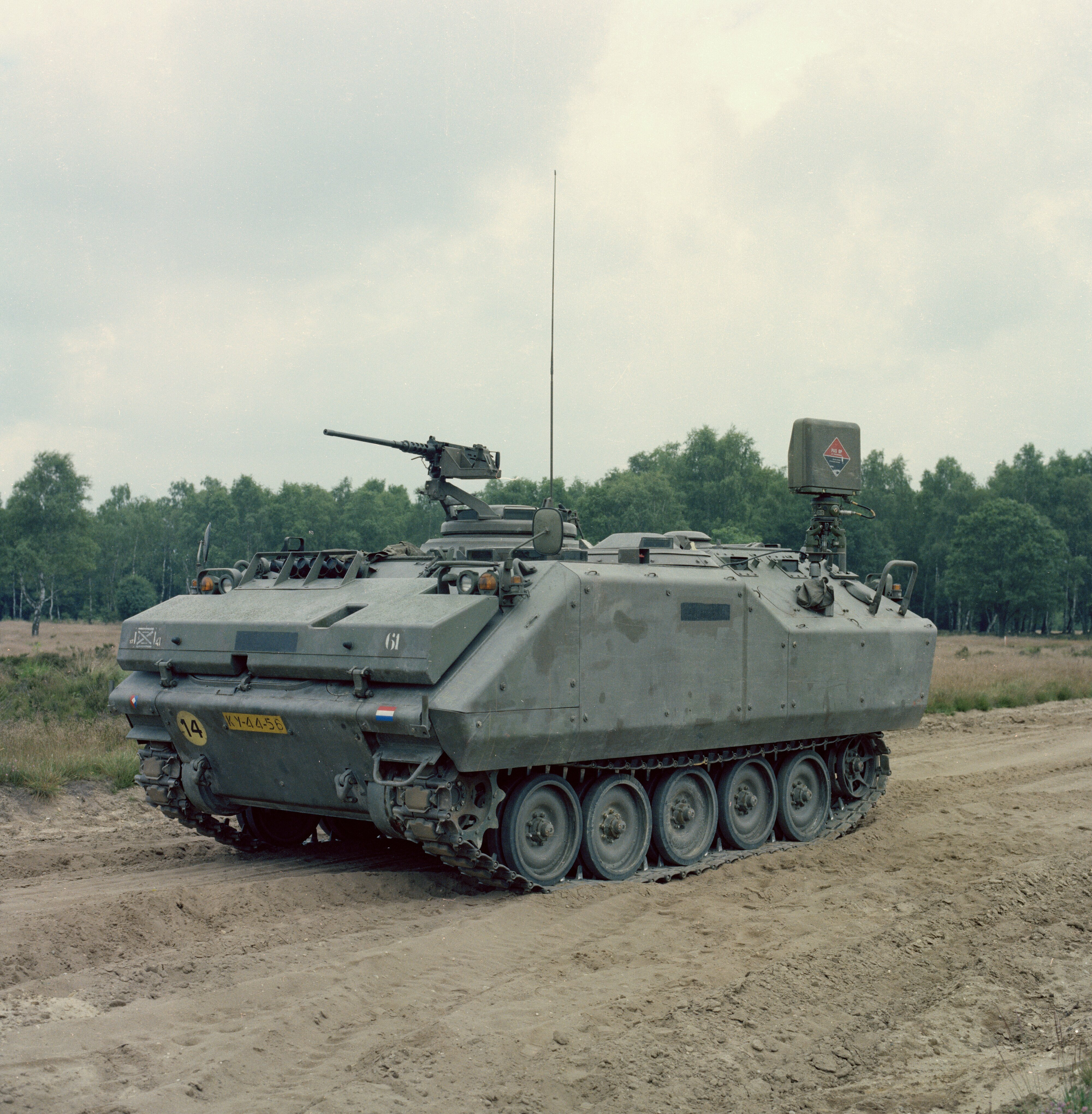
The YPR-765 PRRDR equipped with a battlefield surveillance radar.

- YPR-765 PRCO-series (pantser-rups-commando, i.e. command post vehicle)
  - YPR-765 PRCO-B — company commander's vehicle with the same EWS-turret as the pri; crew of six plus two passengers; folding table in the rear compartment with two inward-facing seats on either side.
  - YPR-765 PRCO-C-1 — battalion commander's vehicle with a .50-caliber M2 HB machine gun on an M26 cupola; crew of five plus four passengers; folding table in the rear compartment with a three-seat bench on the left and two seats on the right, all facing inward.
  - YPR-765 PRCO-C-2 — battalion fire control center with a .50-caliber M2 HB machine gun on an M26 cupola; crew of seven plus one passenger; rear compartment as for C-1.
  - YPR-765 PRCO-C-3 — mortar fire control vehicle with a .50-caliber M2 HB machine gun on an M26 cupola; crew of four plus one passenger; the rear compartment has a folding table with two inward-facing seats on the left side and a large bulletin board for military maps on the right side.
  - YPR-765 PRCO-C-4 — armored command post vehicle for armored anti-aircraft artillery PRTL platoons. Equipped with a .50-caliber M2 HB machine gun on an M113-type cupola; crew of three; folding table in the rear compartment with an inward-facing, three-seat bench on the left. This vehicle is equipped with a diesel-heater, a tall collapsible antenna mast on the left side of the hull and a tent extension that could be attached to the rear of the vehicle's hull to provide additional work space.
  - YPR-765 PRCO-C-5 — observation vehicle for artillery units with a .50-caliber M2 HB machine gun on an M113-type cupola; crew of five; rear compartment with a folding table with two inward-facing seats on the left.
- YPR-765 PRRDR (pantser-rups-radar) — vehicle equipped with a ZB-298 battlefield surveillance radar, armed with a .50-caliber M2 HB machine gun on an M113-type cupola; crew of four plus two passengers; folding table in the rear compartment, with one inward-facing seat on either side. Each tank battalion and each armored infantry battalion had three of these in its staff and support company.
  - YPR-765 PRDRR-C — radar platoon command vehicle. Withdrawn from service.

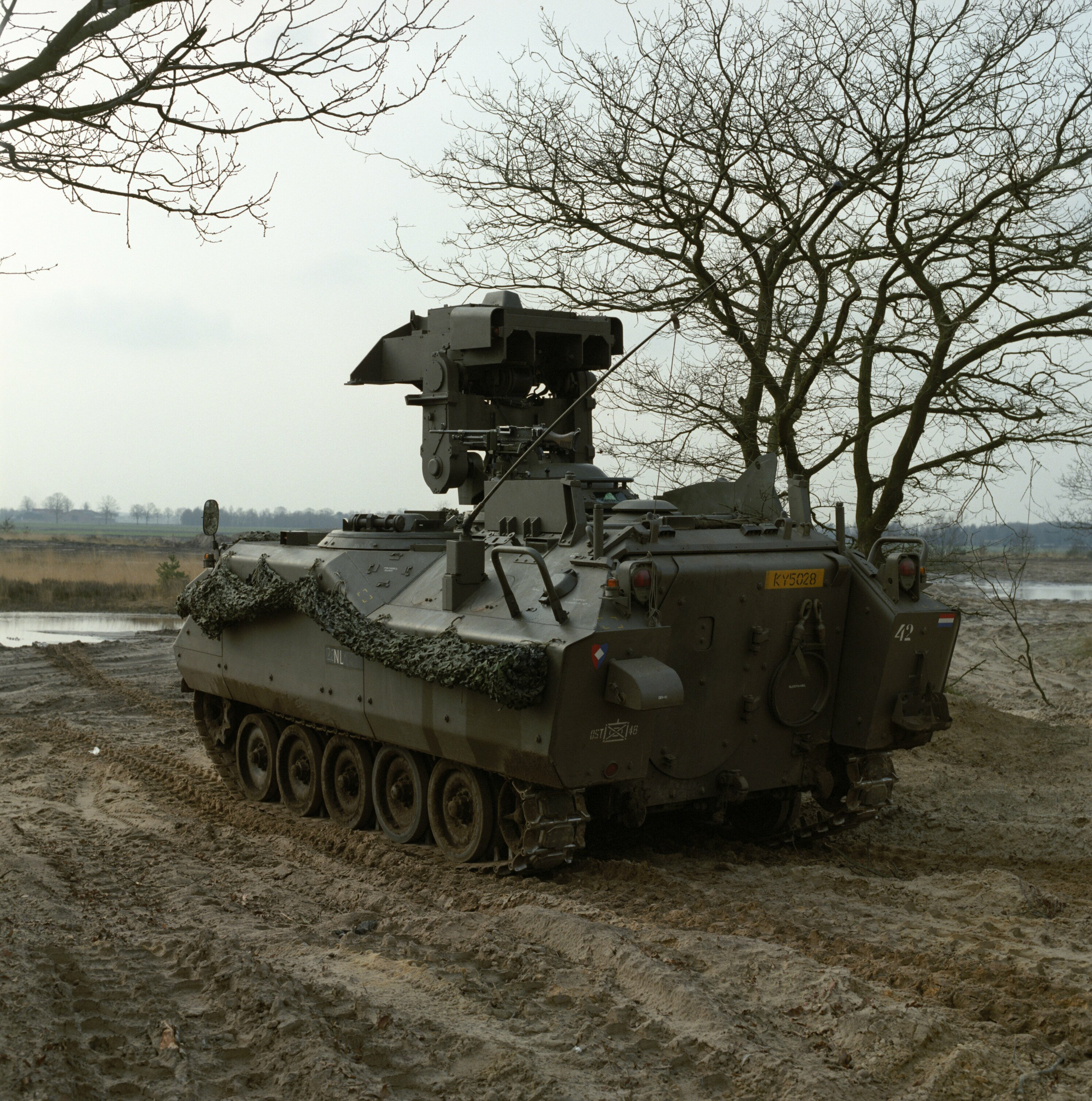
Royal Netherlands Army YPR-765 PRAT tank destroyer.

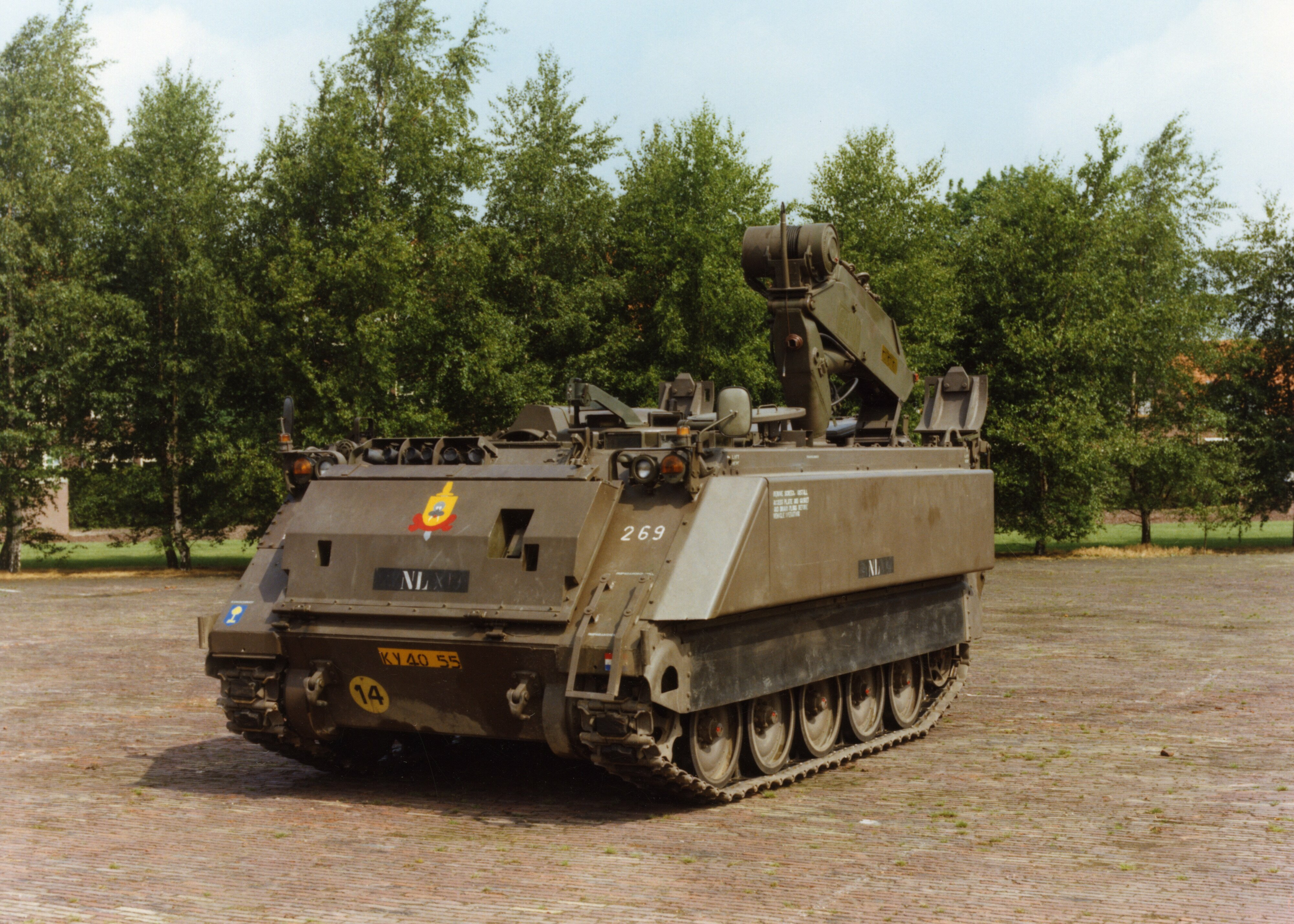
The YPR-806 PRBRG armoured recovery vehicle.

- YPR-765 PRGWT (pantser-rups-gewondentransport) — armored medical evacuation vehicle (AMEV); unarmed; crew of three plus five passengers; rear compartment has two forward-facing seats on the left, bins for the personal equipment of the wounded on either side, and can hold two stretchers on either side, suspended from chains. The vehicle is equipped with a diesel-heater.
- YPR-765 PRMR (pantser-rups-mortiertrekker) — armored mortar tractor for MO-120-RT 120 mm mortar with a .50-caliber M2 HB machine gun on an M26 cupola; crew of seven, including mortar crew; rear compartment has an inward-facing, three-seat bench on the left and a mortar ammunition rack on the right. Storage racks for 150 mortar rounds.
- YPR-765 PRV (pantser-rups-vracht) — armored cargo vehicle (vracht = cargo, freight) with a .50-caliber M2 HB machine gun on an M113-type cupola; crew of two; empty rear compartment with a folding safety screen between the crew and cargo.
- YPR-765 PRAT (pantser-rups-anti tank) — tank destroyer armed with an Emerson TOW Under Armor "Hammerhead"-turret similar to that of the M901 ITV and an FN MAG machine gun on a pintle mount; crew of four; rear compartment holds a rack with missile reloads on the left, an inward-facing bench seat and various equipment, including a M41 tripod) on the right.
- YPR-806 PRBRG (pantser-rups-berging) — armored recovery vehicle; US Army designation is M806, it is based on a modified M113 chassis and hull but using AIFV automotive components. Repair and recovery vehicle equipped with an internal winch and two earth anchors mounted on the rear hull.

=== Philippine service variants ===
The Philippine Army uses a mixed variant of earlier AIFVs similar to the Dutch YPR-765, and later variants from Turkey based on the ACV-300.

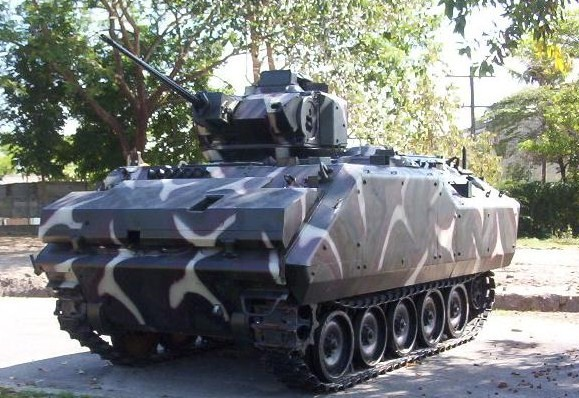
Philippine Army AIFV-25

- AIFV-25 — basic infantry fighting vehicle armed with a 25 mm Oerlikon KBA-B02 cannon and a coaxial machine gun
- AIFV-ARV — armored recovery vehicle
- ACV-300 APC — with a 12.7 mm M2 machine gun in a shielded gun cupola; later upgraded with FNSS Saber turrets with either 40mm AGL or 12.7mm M2 machine gun paired with 7.62mm machine gun
- ACV-300 ARV — armored recovery vehicle

=== Turkey ===
==== Service variants ====
- ACV-AAPC (advanced armored personnel carrier) — with a one-man turret with a 12.7 mm machine gun and a 7.62 mm machine gun; 13 troops carried.
- ACV-AIFV (advanced infantry fighting vehicle) — fitted with a stabilized 25 mm one-man Sharpshooter Turret and has the capacity of carrying 11 personnel.
  - AIFV with FMC EWS (assembled by DAF Special Products) turret with a 25 mm Oerlikon Contraves 25 mm cannon and a coaxial 7.62 mm machine gun
  - AIFV with Giat Dragar turret with a 25 mm M811 cannon and a coaxial 7.62 mm machine gun.
- ACV-ATV — Armored Tow Vehicle. Fitted with a Norwegian one-man turret with two BGM-71 TOW missiles in a ready to launch position, and four troops carried.
- ACV-AMV — Armored Mortar Vehicle. Fitted with an 81 mm mortar and a 7.62 mm machine gun.

==== Turkish private variants ====
- 120mm AMV — A private venture, armed with a TDA 120 mm recoiling mortar in the rear of the vehicle. Not in service.
- ACV with HMTS — armed with four Hellfire missiles in the ready to fire position.
- ACV-300 — Fitted with a 300 hp (220 kW) powerpack similar to the M113A3.
- ACV-350 — Fitted with a 350 hp (260 kW) powerpack.
- ACV-S/ACV-19 — A stretched version of the AIFV with an additional road wheel and extra armor giving resistance to 14.5 mm AP projectiles, with an upgraded 350 or 400 hp (300 kW) powerpack. Weight is 18,000 kg. A variety of turrets are available, including 12.7 mm, 25 mm (FNSS Sharpshooter Turret) and 30 mm as well as an Eryx missile launcher and 120 mm mortar turret.

=== UAE variants ===
- ACV-RV (Armored Recovery Vehicle)
- ACV-AESV (Armored Engineering Squad Vehicle)
- ACV-AFOV (Armored Artillery FO Vehicle)
- ACV-ACPV (Armored Command Post Vehicle)

Note: all are ACV-350 and fitted with air conditioning and an over-pressure NBC system.

== Operators ==
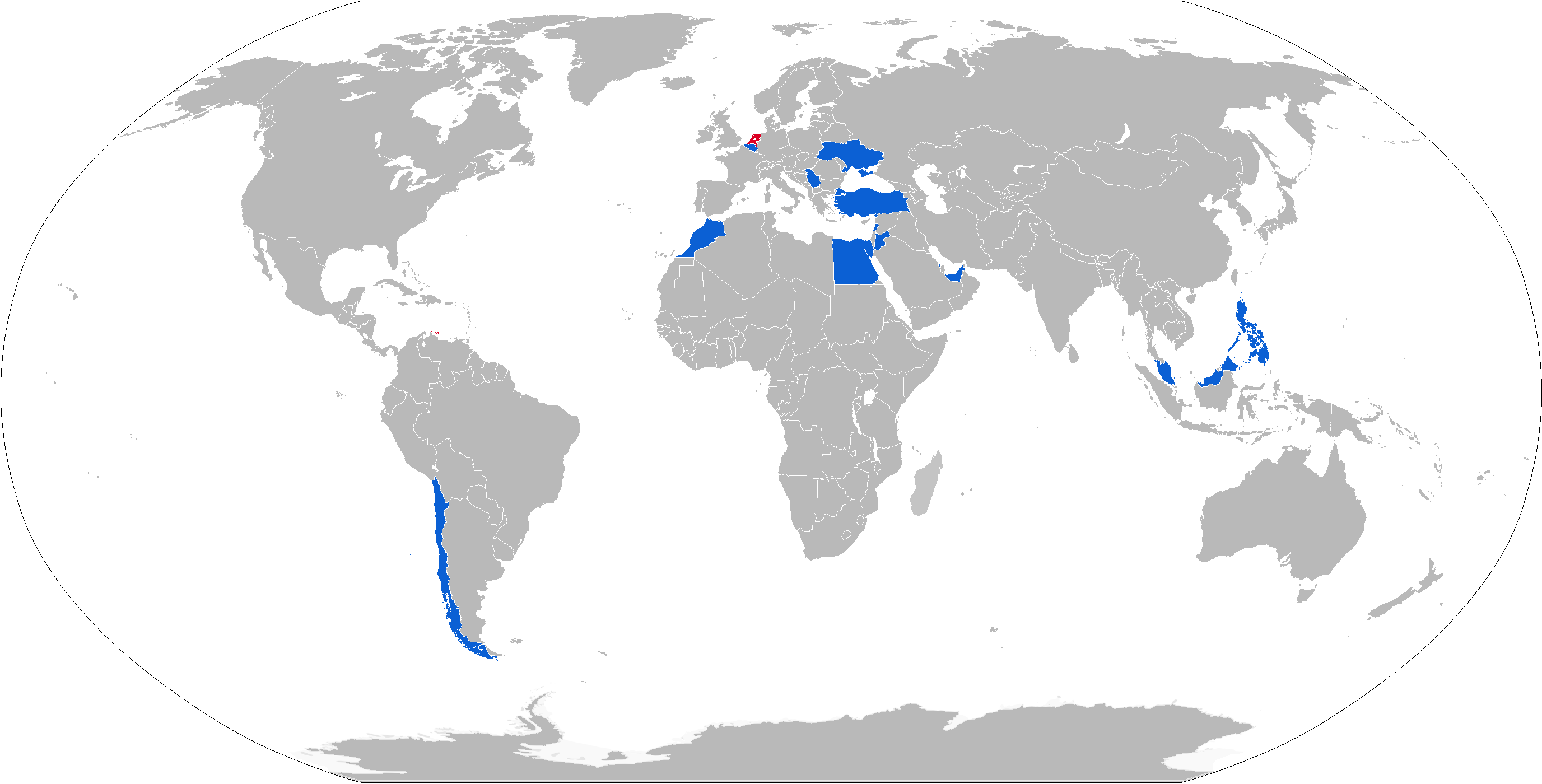
Map of AIFV operators in blue

=== Current operators ===
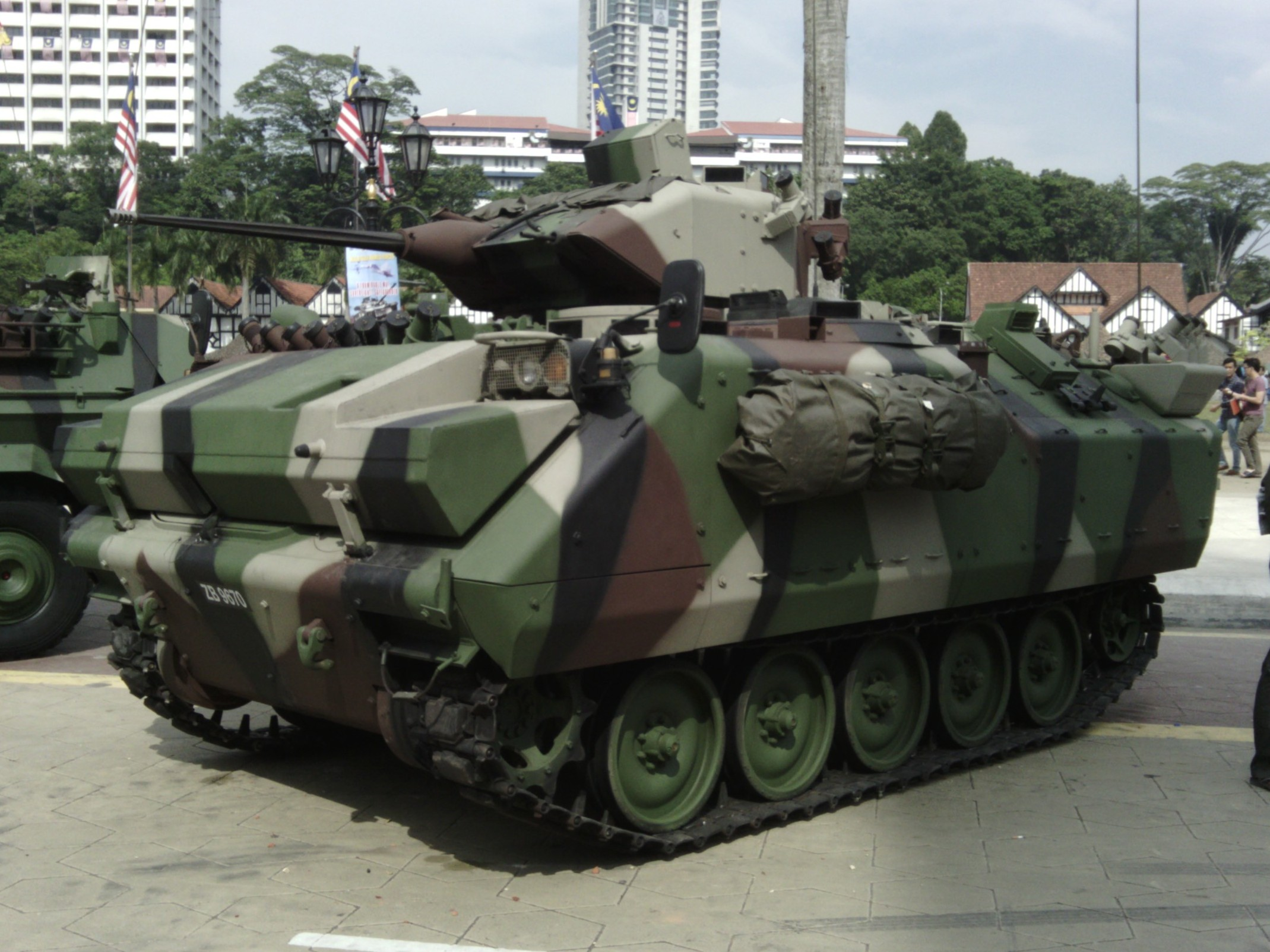
ACV-15 of the Malaysian Army.

- Bahrain, 25 Netherlands-origin YPR-765 ACV delivered in 1996, 42 Belgium-origin AIFV-IFV delivered in 2008, 8 (est.) Belgium-origin AIFV-APC delivered in 2008
- Chile, 139 YPR-765s purchased from the Netherlands and Belgium.
- Egypt, More than 1,000 YPR-765s purchased from the Netherlands and Belgium since 1996.
- Jordan, 441 YPR-765s purchased from the Netherlands, 58 AIFV-Bs purchased from Belgium.
- Lebanon, 16 ex-Belgian AIFV-B-C25 vehicles.
- Morocco, 90 ex-Belgian AIFV-B-C25 and 20 AIFV-B-.50, delivered in 2008.
- Netherlands, now only uses the YPR-806 A1 PRB (pantserrupsberging) and YPR-KMar (Koninklijke Marechaussee).
- Malaysia, 267 FNSS ACV-15 vehicles received.
- Philippines, 58 vehicles, composed of 45 AIFV-25 and 6 AIFV-ARV received from the United States in 1979, 6 ACV-300 APCs and 1 ACV-ARV received from FNSS of Turkey in 2010 and 2004, respectively. 6 Units of AIFV-25 Operated by Presidential Security Group
- Russia, at least 3 YPR-765 captured in Ukraine during the 2022 Russian invasion of Ukraine.
- Serbia, undisclosed number of Dutch YPR-765 captured in Bosnian War 1992–1995, currently 2 in use by Serbian Gendarmerie
- Turkey, 2,249 were produced under licence (1,698 between 1990 and 2000 and 551 between 2001 and 2004)
  - 1,380 × AAPC
  - 650 × AIFV
  - 48 × ATV
  - 170 × AMV
  - also some engineering and ambulance variants.
- Ukraine, 196 received from the Netherlands.
- United Arab Emirates, 133 vehicles received from Turkey.

=== Former operators ===
- Belgium, all vehicles replaced by MOWAG Piranha III
- Netherlands 2,079 vehicles. Known locally as the YPR-765. Most have been replaced by a combination of CV9035NL, Fennek and Boxer vehicles.

== See also ==
- K200 KIFV, similar South Korean vehicle

== Bibliography ==
- Jane's Armour and Artillery 2005-2006
- SIPRI Database
- R.P. Hunnicutt (1999). Bradley, A History of American Fighting and Support Vehicles. Presidio Press. ISBN 0-89141-694-3.
