= SIDAM 25 =

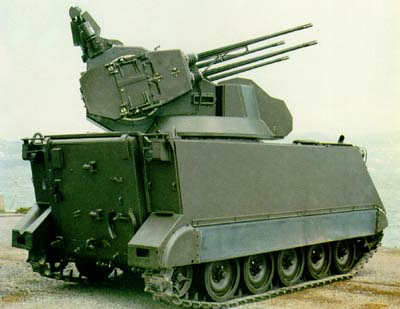
- SIDAM 25
- Type: Self-propelled anti-aircraft gun
- Place of origin: Italy

Specifications
- Mass: 12,500 kg (27,600 lb)
- Length: 5.04 m (16 ft 6 in)
- Width: 2.69 m (8 ft 10 in)
- Height: 1.83 m (6 ft) minus turret
- Crew: 3
- Armor: 38 mm (1.5 in) aluminum
- Main armament: 4 × 25 mm Oerlikon KBA cannons
- Engine: Detroit Diesel 6V-53; 215 hp (160 kW)
- Suspension: torsion-bar
- Operational range: 500 km (310 miles)
- Maximum speed: 68 km/h (42 mph)

The SIDAM 25 is a self-propelled anti-aircraft gun developed in Italy from the chassis of the American M113 armoured personnel carrier. Due to the choice of basic chassis for the SIDAM 25, components and spare parts were both cheap, and readily available due to the widespread use of the basic M113. Beginning production in 1987, OTO Breda built a large turret to accommodate the four Oerlikon KBA cannons and remodeled the hull of the M113 slightly to provide side-access to the internal space of the vehicle by the addition of a side-mounted door.

== Armament ==
The Oerlikon KBA cannon has an effective range of about 2,500 m (8,200 ft) and can engage low-flying targets with accuracy within that range. Firing at 2,440 rounds per minute, the turret contains 150 rounds of high-explosive fragmentation ammunition for each gun. An internal magazine also houses 40 APDS rounds that can be used against enemy vehicles. The turret can rotate through 360° and the guns can be raised 87° or lowered 5° from the horizontal position. Firing slots in the turret and hull are provided.

== Fire control and observation ==
Target engagement is made using an optronic fire control system and a laser rangefinder, but the lack of radar reduces its targeting capability in deteriorated weather conditions.

== Propulsion ==
The SIDAM 25 is powered by a single 6-cylinder Detroit 6V-53 engine, which delivers 215 hp (160 kW) and drives the SIDAM 25 to a top road speed of 68 km/h (42 mph) and allows the vehicle to climb vertical obstacles of 0.6 m (2 ft) in height and climb gradients with a 60% incline and cross trenches up to 1.7 m (5 ft 7 in) wide.

== Operators ==
- Italy
- Belgium

== Possible Operators ==
- Ukraine

== See also ==
- M163 VADS

Non-NATO

- ZSU-23-4
