= PNS Moawin (A39) =

Pakistani navy ship

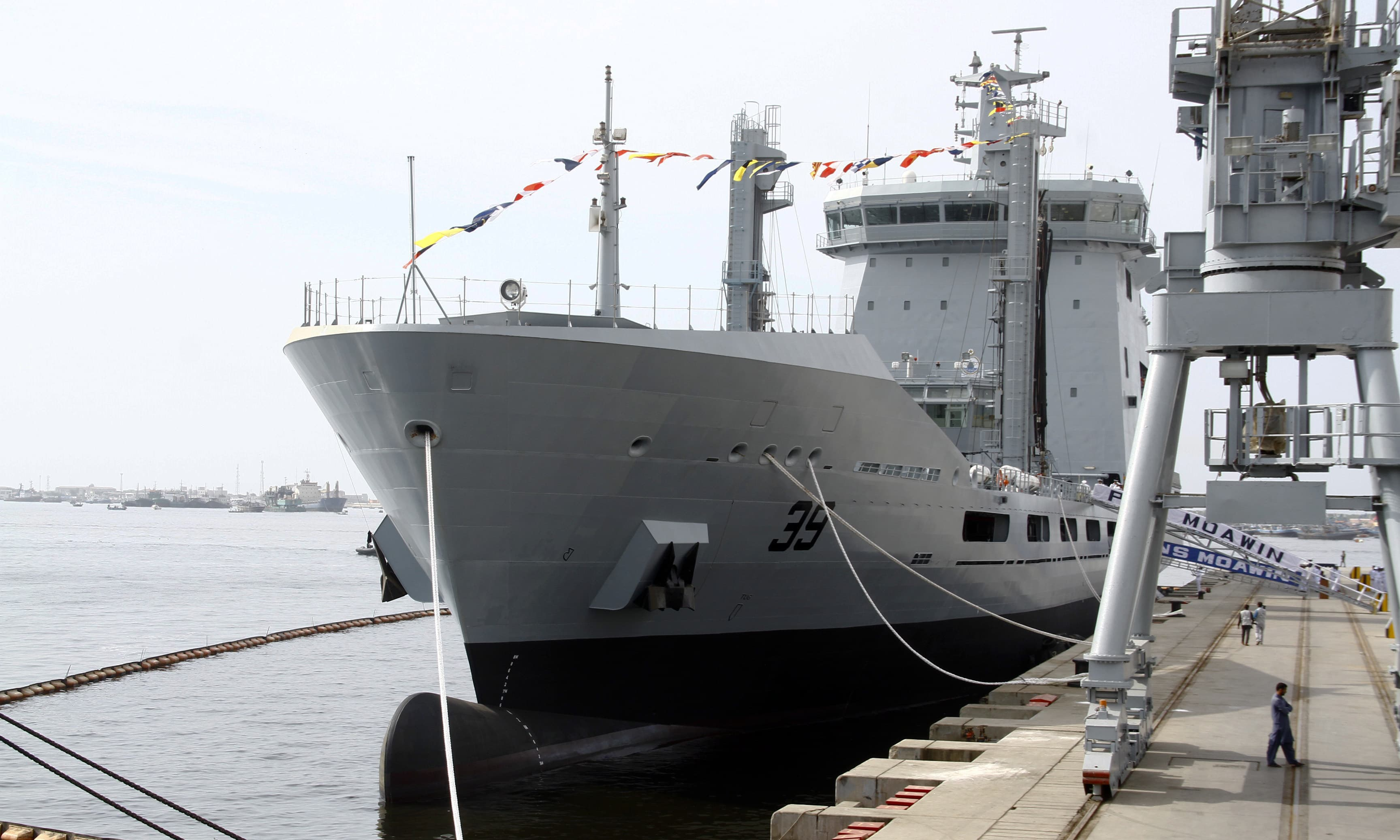
- Moawin in Karachi

History

Pakistan
- Name: PNS Moawin
- Builder: KSEW Ltd. in Pakistan (constructed); STM in Turkey (Designed)
- Laid down: 7 March 2014
- Launched: 19 August 2016
- Acquired: 17 September 2016
- Commissioned: 16 October 2018
- Home port: Karachi Naval Dockyard
- Identification: A39
- Status: In current service

General characteristics
- Class & type: Replenishment oiler
- Displacement: 17,000 long tons (17,000 t) full load
- Length: 158.4 m (519 ft 8 in)
- Beam: 22 m (72 ft 2 in)
- Draught: 6.85 m (22 ft 6 in); 10.5 m (34 ft)
- Installed power: 4 × diesel generators producing: 1,000 kVA each.
- Propulsion: 2 × two diesel engine: 6,000 kW (8,046 hp) (each)
- Speed: 20 knots (37 km/h; 23 mph)
- Range: 12,000 miles (19,000 km) at 15 knots (28 km/h; 17 mph)
- Endurance: 90 days
- Complement: 228 (20 officers, 208 enlisted)
- Armament: 2 × 12.7 mm-caliber machine guns, 2 × 20 mm Phalanx; 2 × 25 mm Aselsan SMASH 200/25 RCWS
- Aircraft carried: 2 × Sea King Mk. 45 2 × Harbin Z-9
- Aviation facilities: Hangar and flight deck

PNS Moawin (A39), is a fleet replenishment tanker currently in service with the Pakistan Navy. Designed by the Turkish firm, STM, she was built and constructed by the Karachi Shipyard and Engineering Works in Karachi, Pakistan. Moawin is noted for its displacement, being the largest warship ever built in Pakistan.

The Pakistan military announced in 2016 that the ship would contain medical facilities and work as a replenishment tanker.

PNS Moawin was deployed in the Red sea because of the attacks made on international ships and vessels by the Houthi Rebels of Yemen Starting from late 2023, following the Israel - Hamas war . PNS Moawin is deployed for oil replenishment of PNS Aslat and PNS shamsheer.

== Brief overview ==
On 22 January 2013, the Ministry of Defence Production (MoDP) signed a contract with the Turkish company STM to design the ship in Turkey together with providing a Kit of Materials to Pakistan, while the engineering construction, outfitting, and sea trials were to be undertaken by Karachi Shipyard in Pakistan. Steel cutting started on 27 November 2013 before the keel was laid down in Karachi on 7 March 2014. She was launched on 19 August 2016 in a ceremony attended by the Prime Minister Nawaz Sharif. Moawin was commissioned by President Arif Alvi on 16 October 2018.

Moawin is designed to provide the Navy's auxiliary support including refuelling and replenishing naval warships. PNS Moawin is armed with two Aselsan STOP remote weapon stations.

=== Construction design and propulsion ===
Moawin has an overall length of 158.4 m (519 ft 8 in), a beam of 22 m (72 ft 2 in) and a draught of 6.85 m (22 ft 6 in). The ship displaces about 17,000 tonnes (17,000 long tons; 19,000 short tons) at full load. The complement is about 228, including 20 officers & 208 enlisted.

The ship is powered by two diesel engines providing a total power of 12 MW (16,000 hp), allowing the ship to reach a maximum speed of 20 knots (37 km/h; 23 mph) and an endurance of 10,000 nautical miles (19,000 km; 12,000 mi) at 15 knots (28 km/h; 17 mph). The fleet tanker can stay at sea for 90 days.

The vessel complies with the latest International Maritime Organisation (IMO) and marine pollution (MARPOL) regulations.
