= Aselsan SMASH 200/25 =

SMASH 200/25 STOP
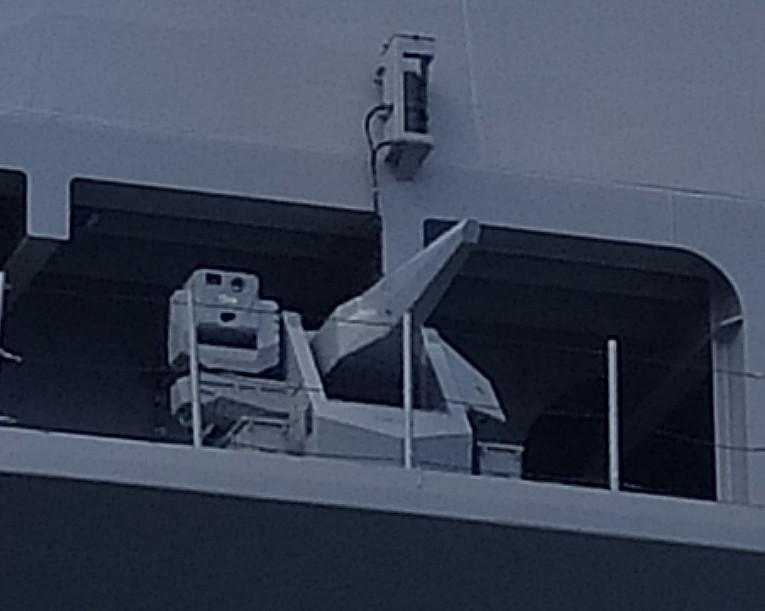
- Aselsan SMASH 200/25 on the fore-starboard side of TCG Anadolu.
- Type: Remote controlled weapon station
- Place of origin: Turkey

Production history
- Designer: Aselsan
- Manufacturer: Aselsan

Specifications
- Mass: 1,350 kilograms (2,980 lb) (Including gun and 250 round ammunition)
- Crew: 1
- Shell: 25×137mm
- Calibre: 25 mm
- Action: Gas-operated (Oerlikon KBA)
- Elevation: -15 (±2)° to +55 (±2)° (gun) -30 (±2)° / +80 (±2)° (EO sights)
- Traverse: 135° (without slipring); 360° (with slipring); Angular speed: 60 degrees per second (both for the gun and EO sights)
- Rate of fire: 450-600 rounds/minutes
- Muzzle velocity: Oerlikon KBA: 1,400 metres per second (4,600 ft/s); M242 Bushmaster: 1,100 metres per second (3,600 ft/s)
- Effective firing range: Oerlikon KBA: 3,020 metres (9,910 ft); M242 Bushmaster: 3,000 metres (9,800 ft)
- Feed system: Dual
- Sights: Thermal camera, TV camera and laser range finder

The SMASH 200/25 is a 25 mm gun and independent electro-optic sight equipped dual-feed stabilized remote controlled weapon station (RCWS) manufactured by Turkish company Aselsan. The system was officially called STOP until it changed with the new naming system of the company. The system can be fitted with either a 25 mm Oerlikon KBA or a M242 Bushmaster autocannon. It is one of the Aselsan made RCWS along with the Aselsan SMASH 200/30.

== Design overview ==
The weapon is mounted on a stabilized pedestal mounting which allows it to remain on target as the platform beneath it moves. The mounting does not penetrate the platform (except cables), making it relatively simple to fit the weapon to ships.

Electroptical suit of SMASH 200/25 is independent and separately stabilized. This enables surveillance and target tracking without aiming the gun to the target. Using its sight the SMASH 200/25 system can provide surveillance and target-tracking entirely without outside assistance, allowing it to function fully independently. This sight includes a thermal camera, a TV camera, and a laser range finder. The system performs automatic ballistic calculation for the weapon. It allows for day and night operation under various weather and terrain conditions. It also can be integrated with combat management system of a ship. Its integrated training simulator provides crew training. There is also a manual operation mode as a back-up. The user interface provides an advanced graphical display with Picture-In-Picture functionality. The system is designed for integration with external platform sensors such as radar and wind sensors. The sub-units that comprise the system include a stabilized turret, an independent stabilized optical director, a mission computer, a gun control unit, a servo controller, a power unit, an electronic control and interface unit, and a system operating panel. Additional components consist of a 19-inch panel PC display, a commander control unit, a safety switch, and an optional slip ring.

250 (2 x 125) rounds are carried on the mounting with dual feed system. The mount can traverse 360° when EO sights elevate between -30 (±2)° and +80 (±2)° and gun elevate between -15 (±2)° to +55 (±2)°. The structure is modular to allow for future upgrades and options. Built-in test capabilities and embedded video recording are included. Power is supplied by a 110/220 V AC 50/60 Hz source and a back-up battery unit is included.

== Operators ==
Pakistan

- Pakistan Navy
  - PNS Moawin (A39)
  - Babur-class corvette

Turkey

- Turkish Navy
  - TCG Anadolu

Others

- According to a report in 2019, Aselsan signed deals to export Aselsan SMASH 200/25 to five countries, but it did not disclose name of the clients. The Royal Bahraini Naval Force is probably among them.
