= Super Fledermaus =

Swiss radar fire control system

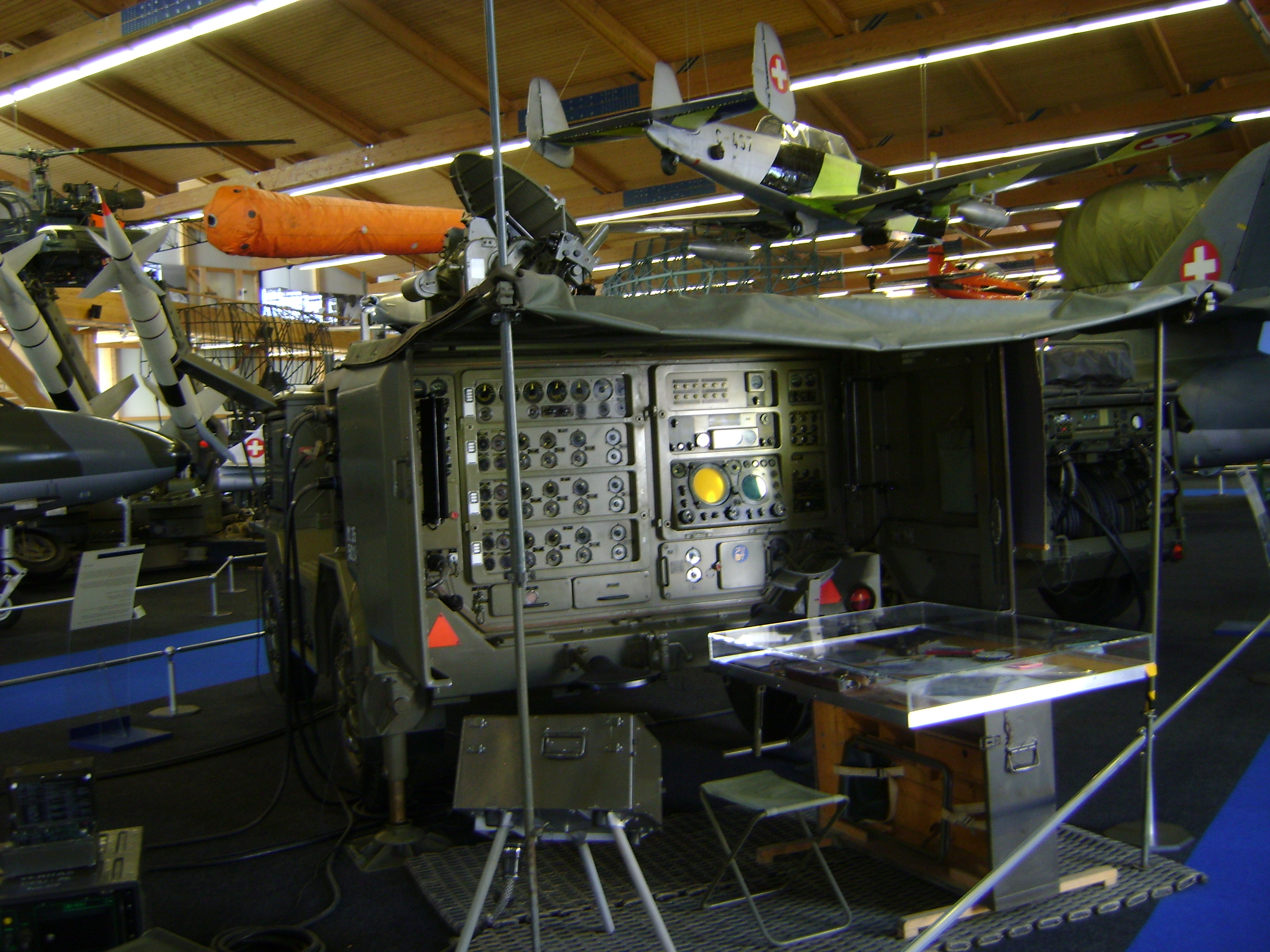
Feuerleitgerät 63 Superfledermaus at the Flieger-Flab-Museum

The Super Fledermaus (literally Super Bat), known in Swiss service as the Feuerleitgerät 63, Flt Gt 63 (fire control radar unit 63), is a pulse-radar fire control system, 111 of these systems were in service with the Swiss Air Force from 1965 to 1977. Under the lead of Contraves, the Super Fledermaus fire control system was jointly developed and produced by ten companies. It replaced the Fire control radar Mark VII in Swiss service, and was in turn replaced by the Skyguard system.

== Function ==
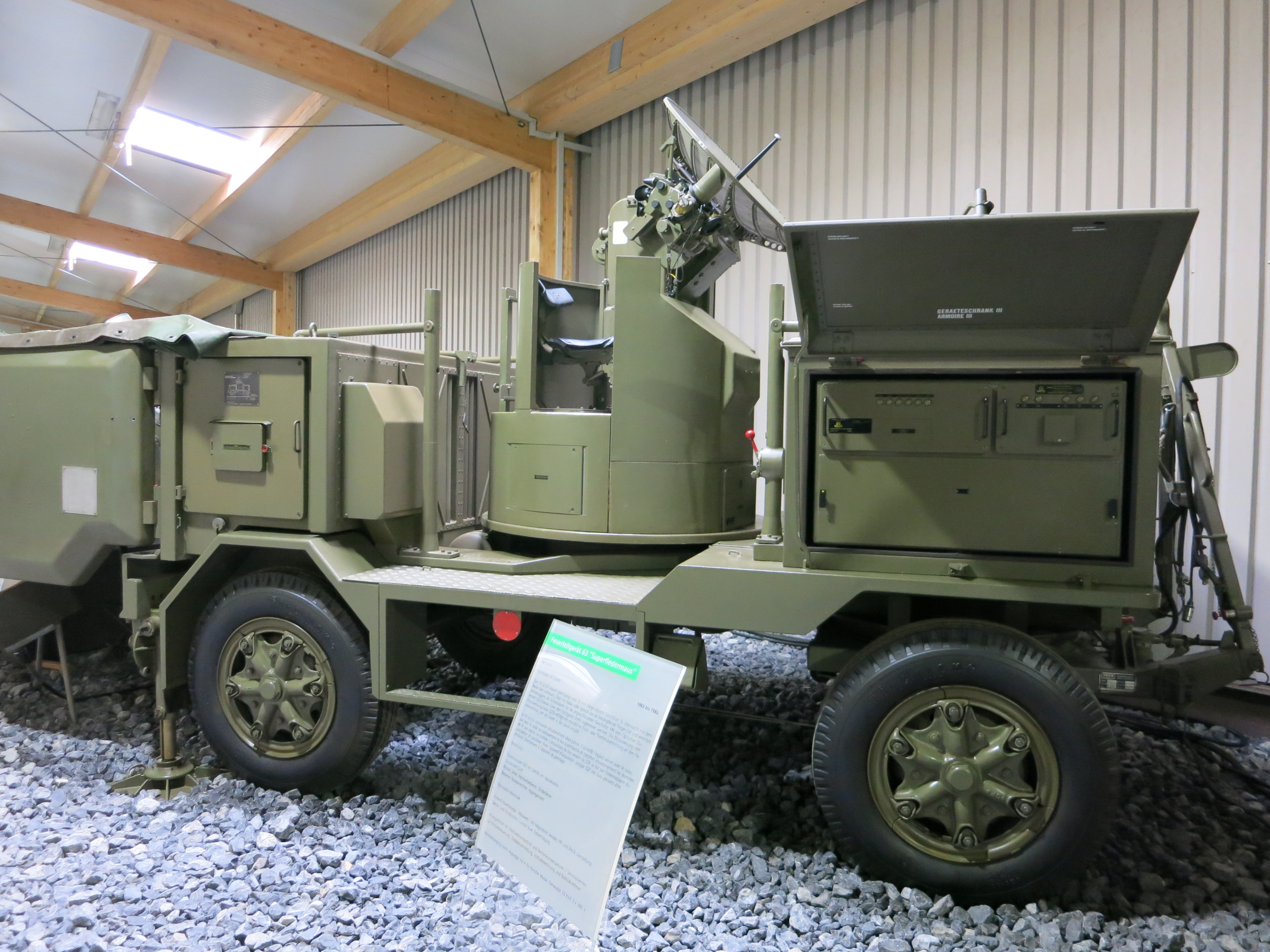
Feuerleitgerät 63 Superfledermaus at the Flieger-Flab-Museum

The Flt Gt 63 comprises a towed trailer, a Doppler radar in the E / F-band with a range of 15 kilometers and a pulse Doppler Rader in the J band, again with a 15 kilometer range, it can simultaneously control two Oerlikon 35 mm twin anti-aircraft mountings. In use the system's E/F band search radar monitors the airspace scanning for targets; once targets have been identified the target can be tracked and engaged either visually or by radar.

Visual operation (OZ) utilizes electro-optical sights on the gun mounts, this allows the direct laying of the guns by their crews; this mode of operation limits the system to daylight/good weather conditions. Radar target assignment (ZZR) requires an oral radio or telephone transmission to the Parallaxcomputer operator, who inputs the search data into the device. Under the control of this analog computer the fire-control radar tracks the target, the computer continuously calculates a firing solution, and lays and fires the guns by remote control. One Argentine Air Force Super Fledermaus system was captured by the British around Port Stanley Airport in 1982. The Super Fledermaus system was used in the first prototype of the Flakpanzer Gepard.

== Technology ==
- Pulse radar with all round and sector search capabilities as well as automatic tracking
- Range: 40km
- Frequency: 8600–9600 MHz
- Transmit pulse power: 150 kW
- Weight: 5400kg
- Power supply by 4-cylinder Porsche engine, generator 23 KVA, 380 V
- Analog converter with AC technology and computing capacitors / power systems for directional target control, target data tracking, lead calculation and ballistic drop compensation
- X-band fire control radar "Albiswerk" with Magnedstation PPI and RH/A display
- Sector or omni search, conical scan target tracking

== Feuerleitgerät / Flt Gt 69 Superfledermaus ==
The Flt Gt69 fire control unit is based on the Flt Gt 63, and from 1970 to 1985, 38 were used by the Swiss Air Force in mobile airfield flak batteries (M FLPL flak Bttr). Otherwise identical to the Flt Gt 63, the Flt Gt 69 featured

- Pulse radar with background clutter suppression
- Three optical target detectors (OZ)

The Flt Gt63 and the Fl Gt69 were replaced in the Swiss Air Force by the Skyguard fire control system.
