= Oerlikon GDF =

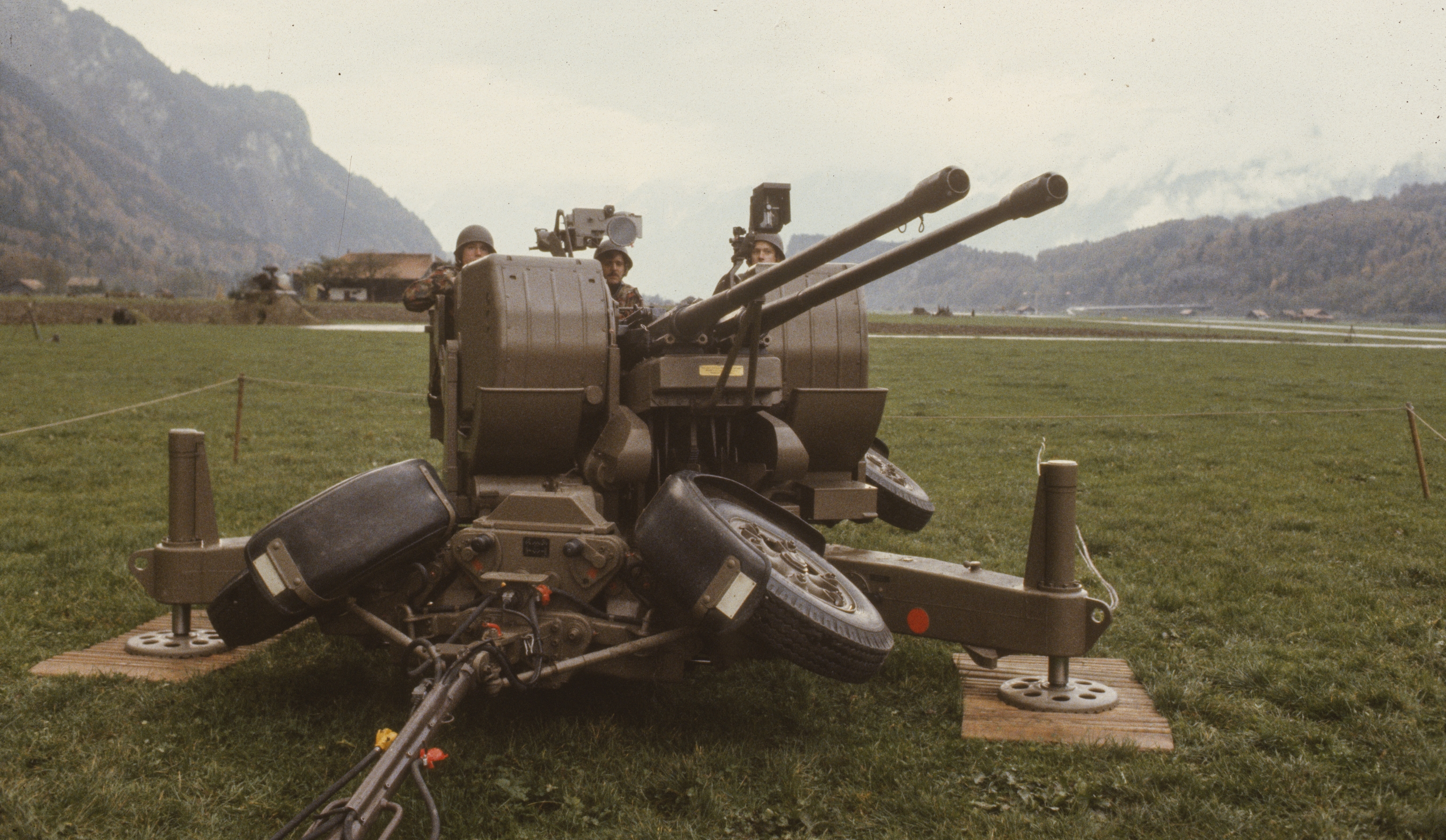
- Swiss 35 mm Oerlikon twin cannon (1979)
- Type: Autocannon
- Place of origin: Switzerland (1958–present)

Service history
- In service: 1963–present
- Used by: See Operators
- Wars: Iran–Iraq War; Falklands War; South African Border War; 2025 India–Pakistan conflict Twelve-Day War

Production history
- Designer: Oerlikon
- Manufacturer: Oerlikon (1958–2009); Rheinmetall (2009–present)
- Produced: 1958–present

Specifications
- Mass: 6,700 kg (14,800 lb) (with ammunition)
- Length: 7.8 m (25 ft 7 in) (travelling)
- Barrel length: 3.15 m (10 ft 4 in) (barrel)
- Width: 2.26 m (7 ft 5 in) (travelling)
- Height: 2.6 m (8 ft 6 in) (travelling)
- Crew: 3
- Shell: Complete round: 35×228mm, 1.565 kg (3 lb 7 oz)
- Caliber: 35 mm (1.4 in)
- Action: Gas-operated, propped-lock locking system
- Carriage: 4 wheels with outriggers
- Elevation: −5°/+92°
- Traverse: Full 360°
- Rate of fire: 550 rounds/min (per barrel)
- Muzzle velocity: 1,175 m/s (3,850 ft/s) (HEI-T)
- Effective firing range: Ceiling: 4,000 m (13,000 ft)

The Oerlikon GDF or Oerlikon 35 mm twin cannon is a towed anti-aircraft gun made by Oerlikon Contraves (renamed as Rheinmetall Air Defence AG following the merger with Rheinmetall in 2009). The system was originally designated 2 ZLA/353 ML but this was later changed to GDF-001. It was developed in the late 1950s and is used by around 30 countries.

The system traces its origins to a post-war effort to develop a series of related autocannon classified by the calibre; 20 mm weapons became the KA series, 25 mm the KB, 30 mm KC, and 35 mm KD. As the first model in the 35 mm line, the gun itself is known as the Oerlikon KDA. Although single-gun systems have been used, the twin-gun mount became almost universal, and the KDA naming fell from use.

== Design and development ==
The system uses twin autocannons, firing 35×228mm NATO-standard ammunition. It was originally designated 353 MK and is now designated as the KD series. The same KD series 35 mm cannons are used in the Leopard 1 based Gepard and Type 74 tank based Type 87 SPAAG and Marksman self-propelled anti-aircraft guns (SPAAG). The system could be paired with the off-gun (remote) Super Fledermaus fire control radar, which in the late 1970s was upgraded to the Skyguard system. The weapons were aimed either directly, by way of an advanced sighting system, or automatically, by locking onto the target with radar. Early models carried 112 rounds ready to fire, and an additional 126 stored on the chassis as reloads. Later versions with automated reloading carry 280 rounds total. A typical engagement burst is 28 rounds.

In 1980 an upgraded model, the GDF-002 was produced, which featured an improved sight, and the ability to be directed by an off-gun digital control system. A few years later a third version of the system was being produced, the GDF-003, which was broadly similar to the GDF-002, but included some enhancements like self-lubricating weapons and integrated protective covers.

A self-propelled concept, the GDF-001 Escorter 35 existed.

In 1985 a further upgraded model was produced, the GDF-005, which was introduced, featuring the Gunking 3D computer-controlled sight with an integrated laser range-finder and digital control system. The GDF-005 also introduced an automated ammunition-handling system, which eliminated the need for the two reloaders, reducing the crew from 3 to 1.

The guns are usually transported by a 5-tonne 6×6 truck.

=== KD series cannons ===
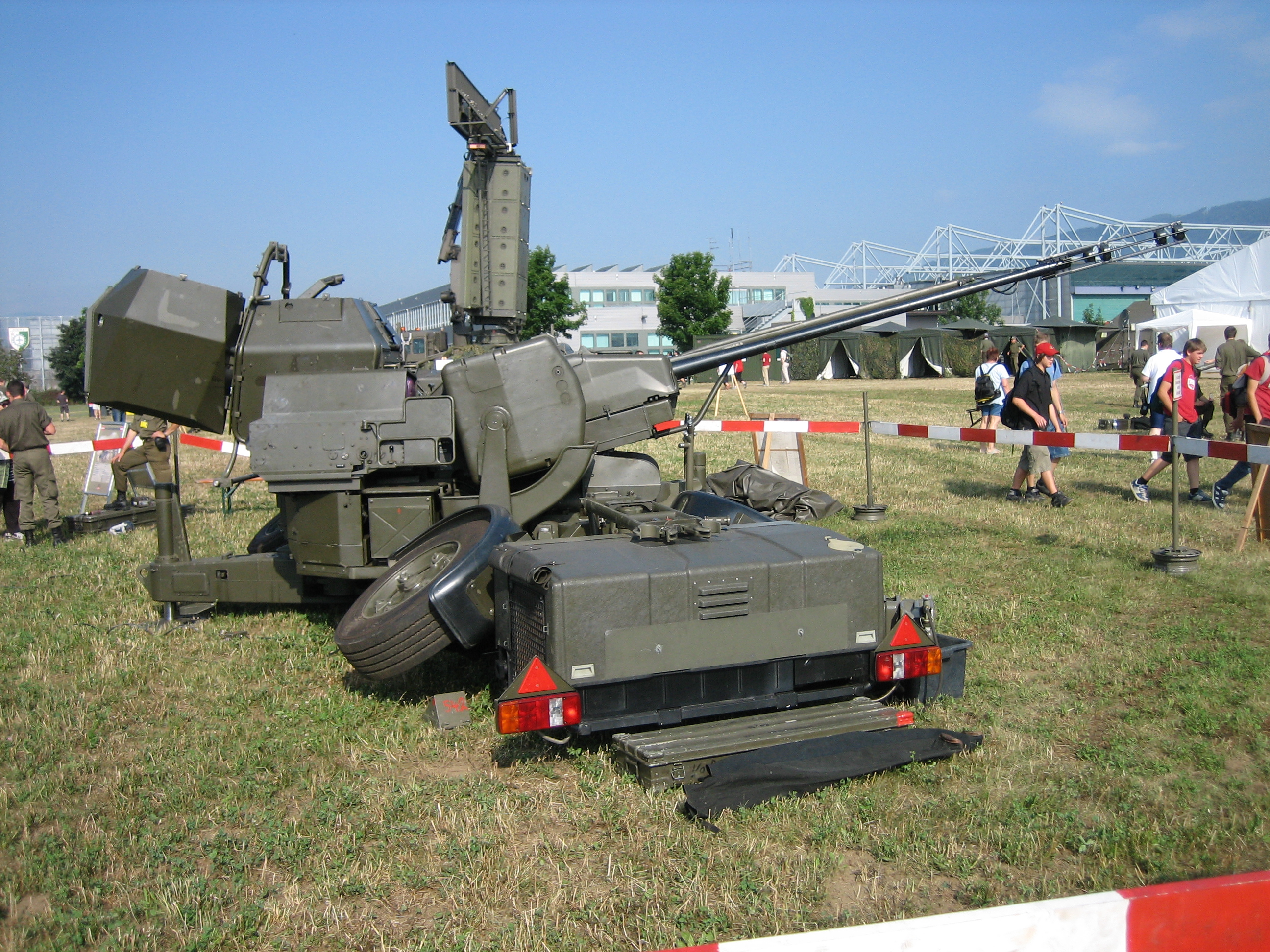
An Austrian GDF-005 (FIAK85) gun system. Note the muzzle velocity measuring device on the muzzle of each gun

Development of the KD series cannon began around 1952 soon after Oerlikon calculated that 35 mm was the optimum calibre for an anti-aircraft gun. The KD series cannons were a design adapted from the post-war 20 mm KAA 204 Gk cannon. Several designs were developed, including a water-cooled design, designated Mk 352, which was tested by the U.S. Navy. The final design was the Mk 323, which was developed in two variants, a belt-fed version the KDA, and a linkless version the KDC, fed by seven-round clips. Both designs are gas-operated, with a propped-lock locking system.

=== Super Fledermaus ===
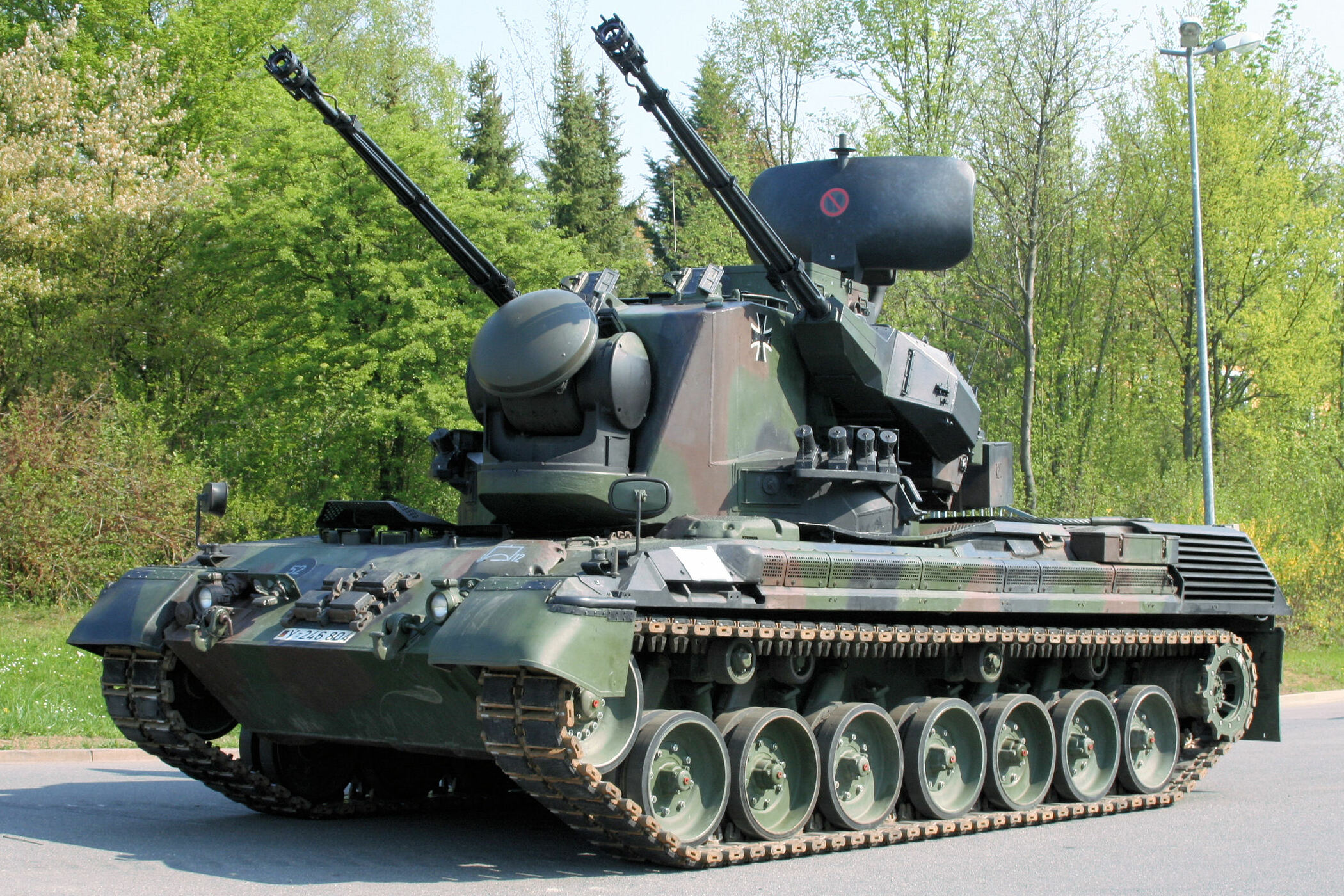
A Gepard SPAAG of the German Army

The Super Fledermaus fire control system was designed and built by the then separate Contraves company. It consists of a four-wheeled towed trailer with an E/F band pulse doppler search radar with a range of around 15 km and a pulse doppler tracking radar operating in the J band, also with a range of 15 km. It was also used as the fire control system on the Gepard SPAAG.

=== Skyguard ===
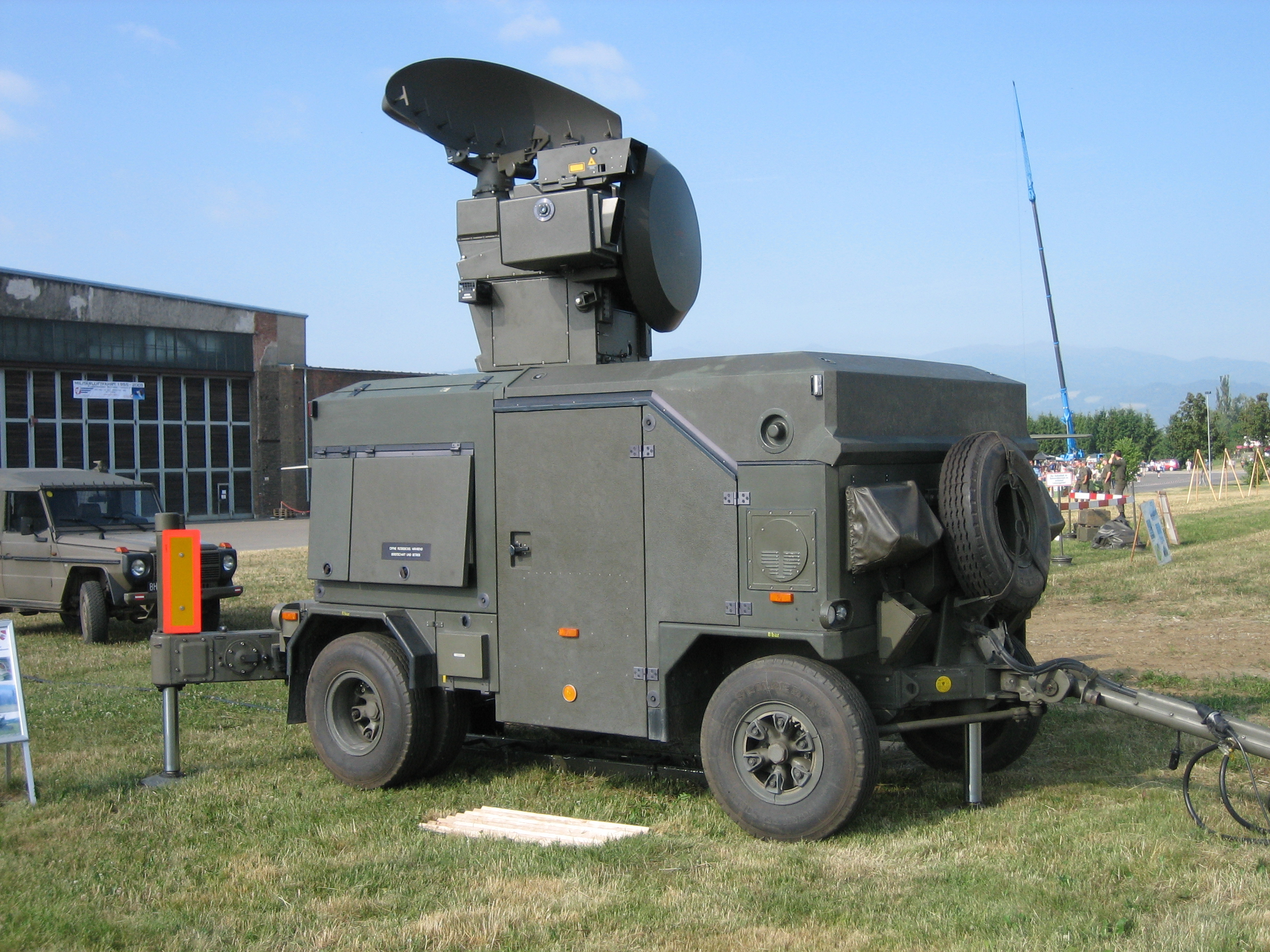
An Oerlikon Contraves Skyguard Radar of the Austrian Air Force

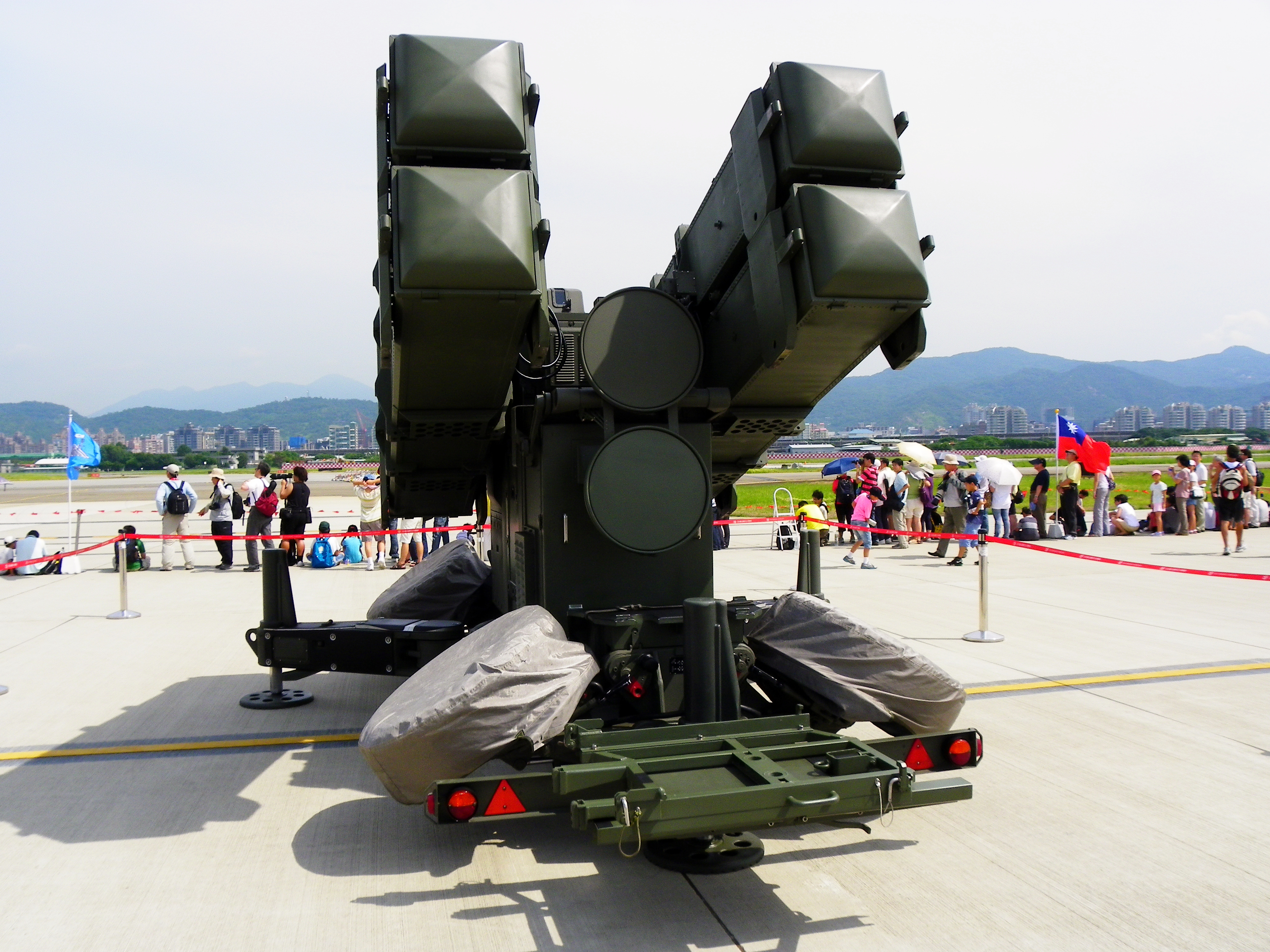
Four-tube Aspide/Sparrow missile launcher closeup

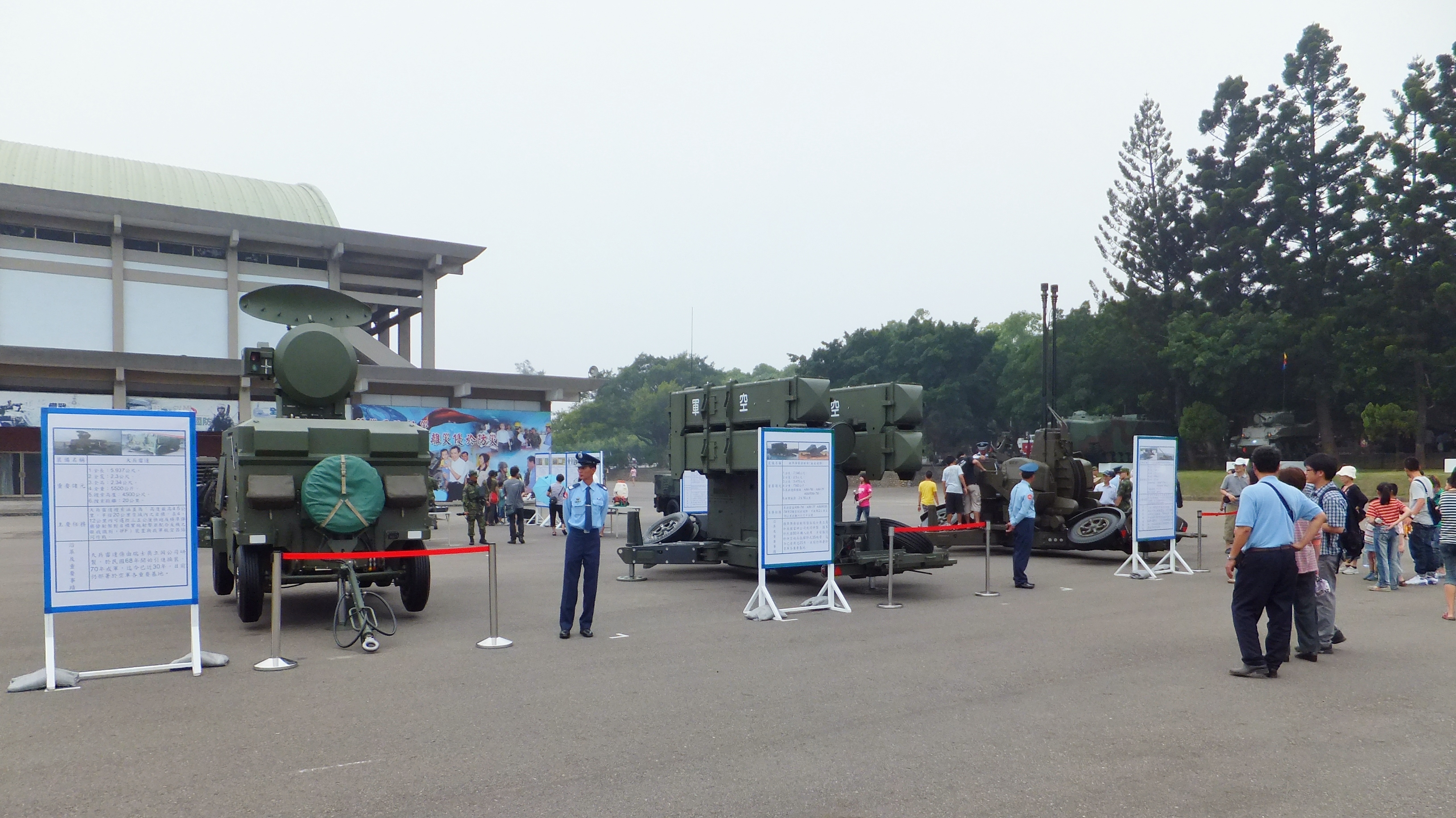
Skyguard System Set Display in Chengkungling, Taiwan

The Skyguard is a fire control system developed by Contraves and introduced in the 1977 to replace the Contraves Super Fledermaus system in the Swiss Air Force. It is produced by Oerlikon-Buehrle (now Rheinmetall Air Defence). Updated versions were fielded in 1975, 1995 and 2010. It is an all weather low- to medium-altitude (up to 3,000 m) air defence system with the maximum effective distance of 4,000 m.

The Skyguard fire control system performs air surveillance, target acquisition, calculation of the derivative-action values and control of the twin 35 mm guns or missiles. Pulse doppler search radar, pulse doppler tracking radar and co-axial television camera are mounted on the roof of the towed trailer. Skyguard is operated by four people. The radar is deployed quickly through the use of hydraulic systems for antenna erection. The trailer houses the crew of two and a small power generator.

A typical fire unit consists of two twin 35 mm gun platforms with a single Skyguard fire control radar. Skyguard systems can also incorporate an optional SAM module based on the GDF's mount and radar system but with the guns replaced by four missile canisters. It can be armed with either AIM-7 Sparrow, RIM-7 Sea Sparrow or Aspide missiles.

The Skyguard radar system was used in the German Air Force for surveillance of low-altitude flight zones. In Taiwanese service, the system includes the Sky Sentinel radar, two 35 mm Oerlikon twin gun and an AIM-7 Sparrow Missile Launcher. Greek service the Skyguard system with RIM-7M is known as the VELOS. In Spanish service, Toledo is a Skyguard system with Aspide launchers where the fire control unit has been replaced with Skydor from Navantia.

A total of 468 systems were built through 1994 and major users were Italy (84 systems), Spain (64 systems) and Pakistan (32 systems).

=== Ammunition ===
NATO designation	HE-T/HEI-T	HE/HEI	HEI(BF)	SAPHEI/SAPHEI-T	APDS/FAPDS	TP-T/TP	AHEAD	ATOM 35mm
Projectile weight	535 g (18.9 oz)	550 g (19 oz)	550 g (19 oz)	550 g (19 oz)	375 g (13.2 oz)	550 g (19 oz)	750 g (26 oz)	n/a
Explosive	98 g (3.5 oz)	112 g (4.0 oz)	70 g (2.5 oz)	22 g (0.78 oz)	n/a	n/a	n/a	n/a
Propellant	330 g (12 oz)							n/a
Complete round	1,565 g (55.2 oz)	1,580 g (56 oz)	1,580 g (56 oz)	1,552 g (54.7 oz)	1,440 g (51 oz)	1,580 g (56 oz)	1,780 g (63 oz)	1,750 g (62 oz)
Muzzle velocity	1,175 m/s (3,850 ft/s)	1,175 m/s (3,850 ft/s)	1,175 m/s (3,850 ft/s)	1,175 m/s (3,850 ft/s)	1,440 m/s (4,700 ft/s)	1,175 m/s (3,850 ft/s)	1,050 m/s (3,400 ft/s)	1,020 m/s (3,300 ft/s)

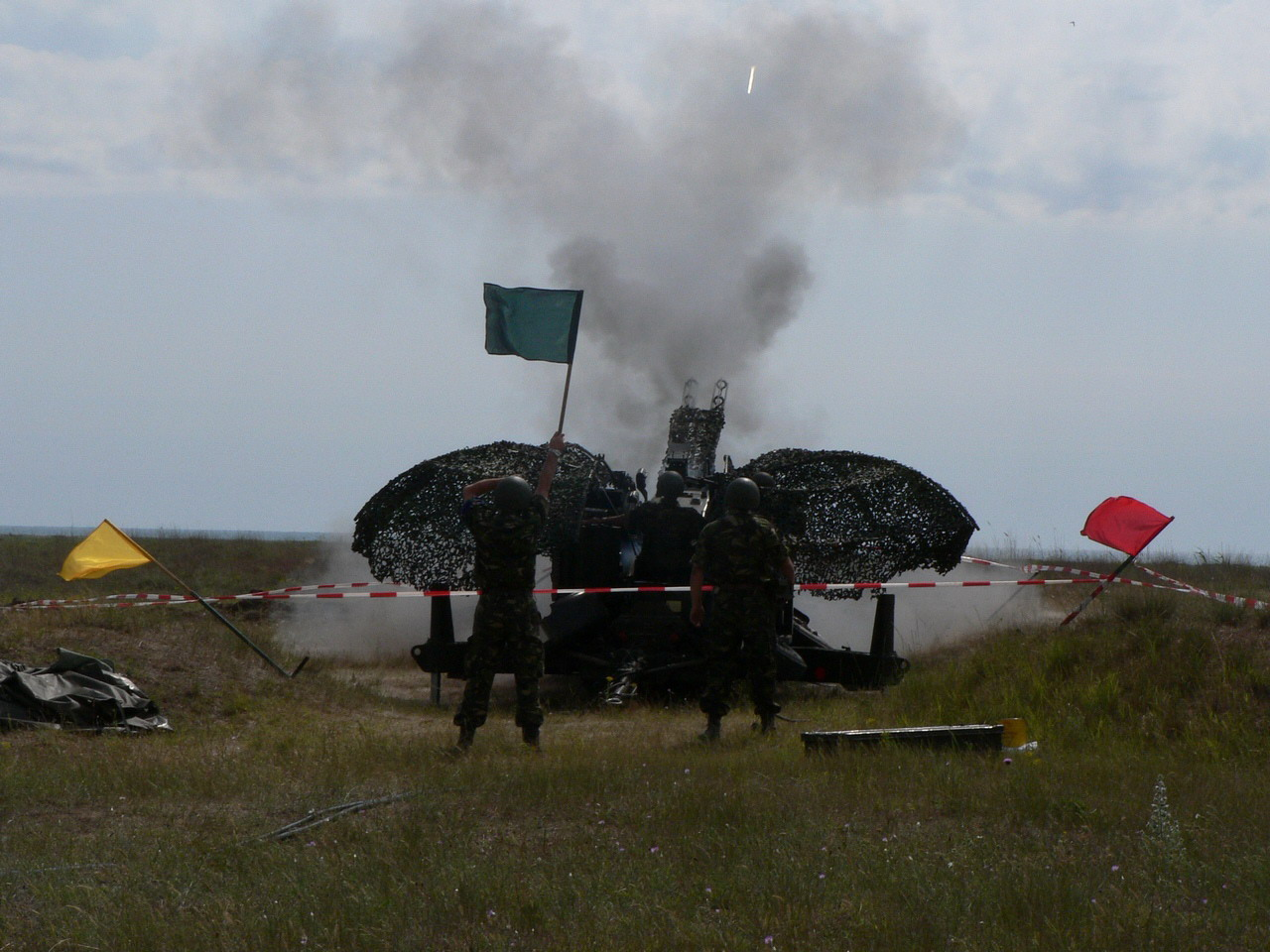
Romanian soldiers firing TP rounds.

Designation:
- HEI: High Explosive Incendiary (-T—Tracer)
- SAPHEI: Semi-Armour Piercing High Explosive Incendiary
- FAPDS: Frangible Armour Piercing Discarding Sabot
- TP: Target Practice (-T—Tracer)
- AHEAD: Anti-missile rounds, that fire "152 heavy tungsten metal sub-projectiles".
- ATOM 35mm: Aselsan ATOM 35mm is a airburst round, that fire tungsten metal pellets as sub-projectiles. It is mainly designed to destroy cruise missiles, anti-ship missiles, unmanned aerial vehicles, precision guided weapons, conventional and rotary-wing aircraft and various ground targets.
  - Specification:
    - Length of complete round : 387 mm
    - Fuze : Time-programmable base fuze with electronic selfdestruct function
    - Effective range : 4000 m
    - Maximum range : 12500 m

Norwegian Nammo, in addition to Oerlikon, supplies at least some variants of this ammunition. Norwegian ammunition was supplied to Ukraine in 2022 for use in the GDF guns in its Flakpanzer Gepard anti-aircraft systems, but it was found not to be compatible, requiring modification.

== Versions ==
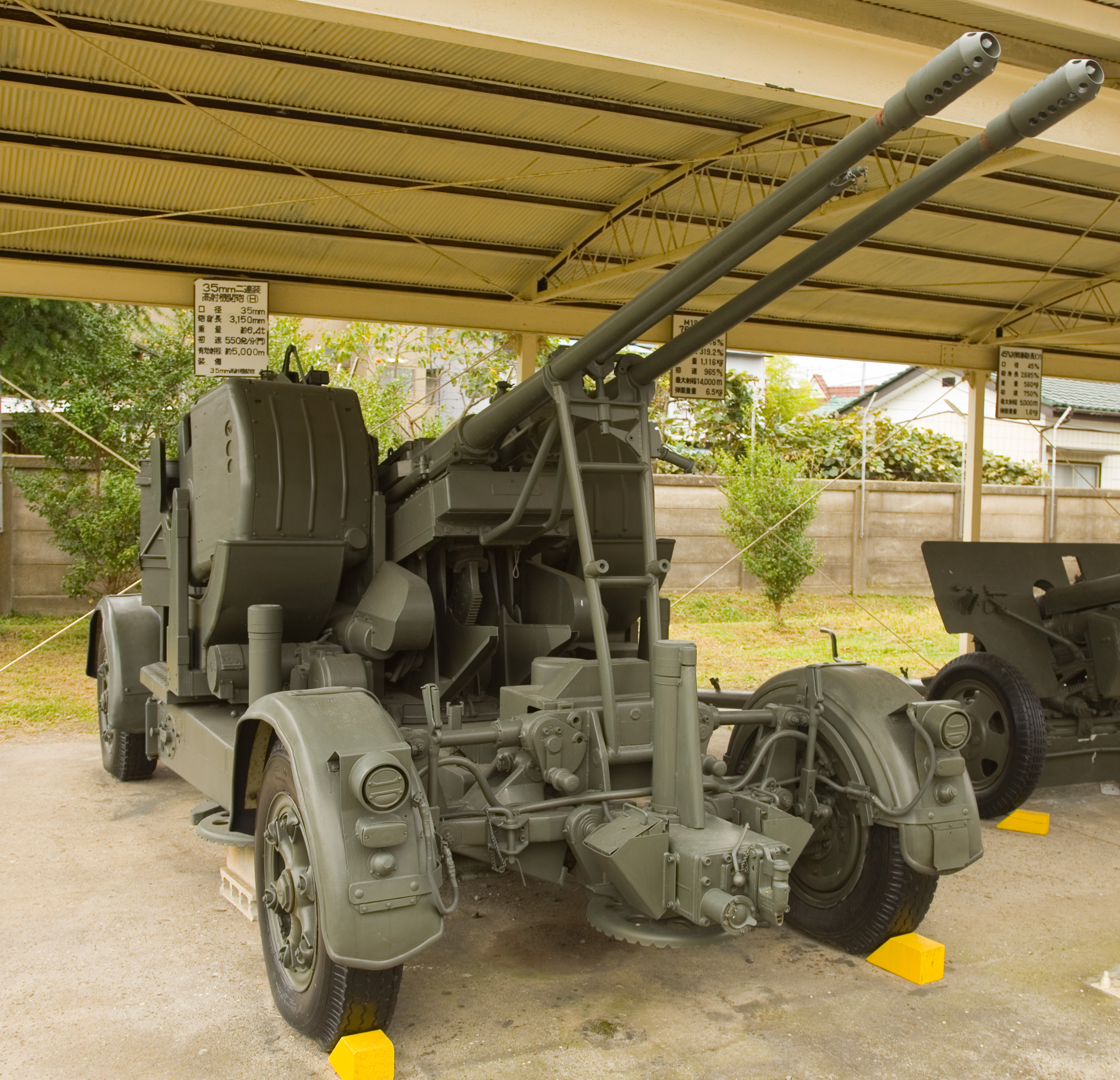
A Japanese built version of the gun in travelling position

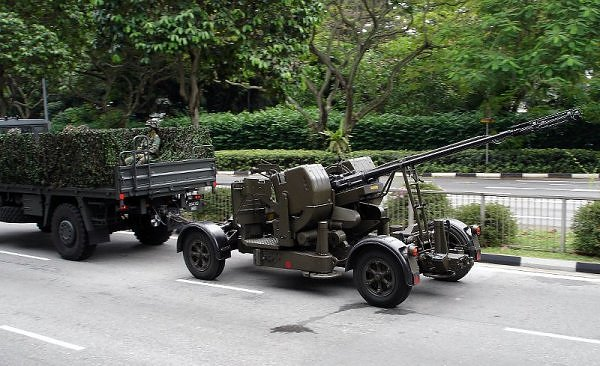
Under tow, an Oerlikon 35mm twin cannon of the Republic of Singapore Air Force

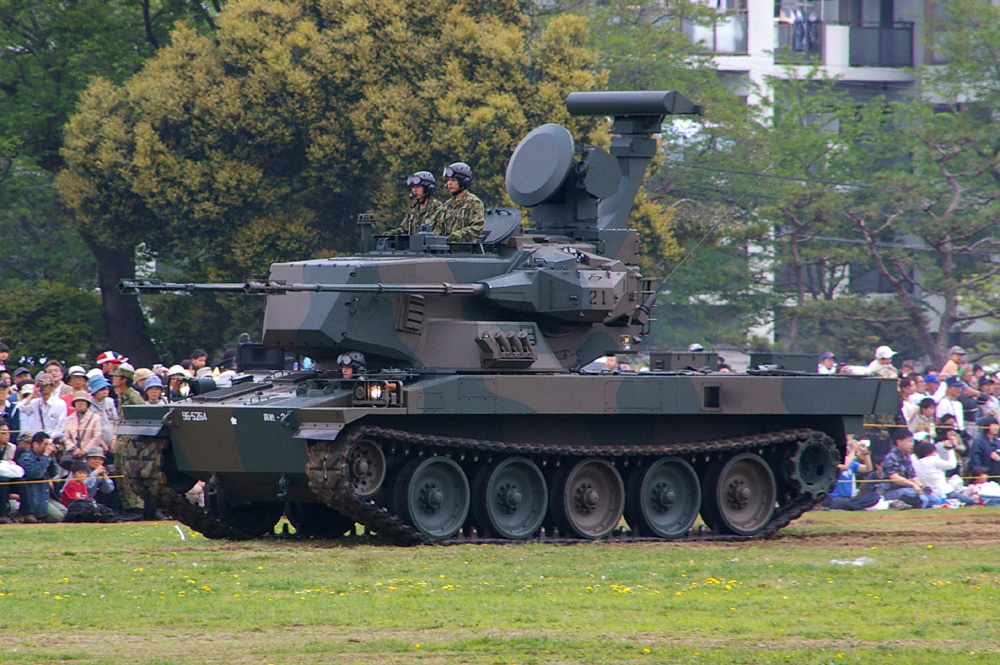
Japanese Type 87 SPAAG

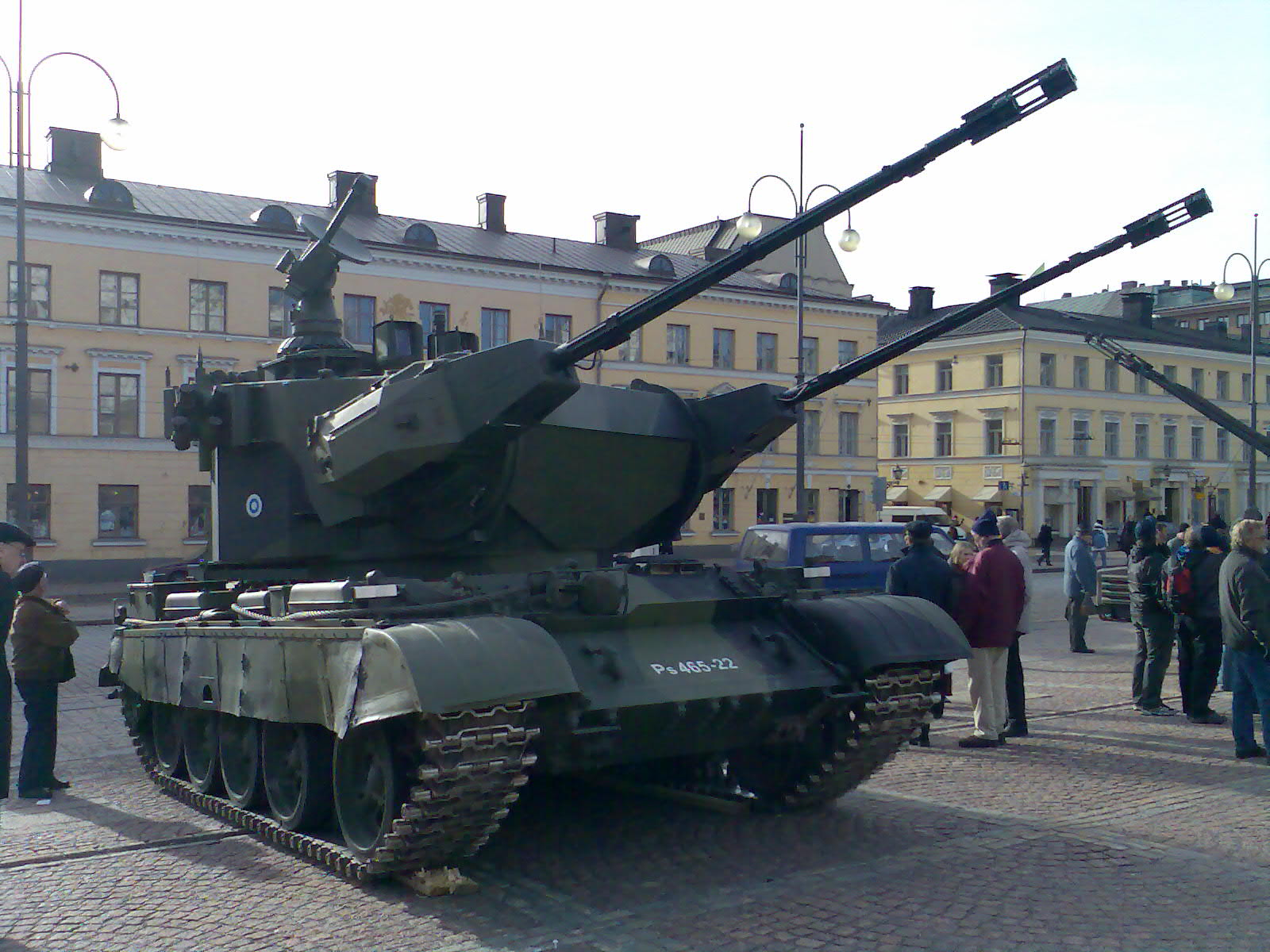
Finnish ITPSV 90

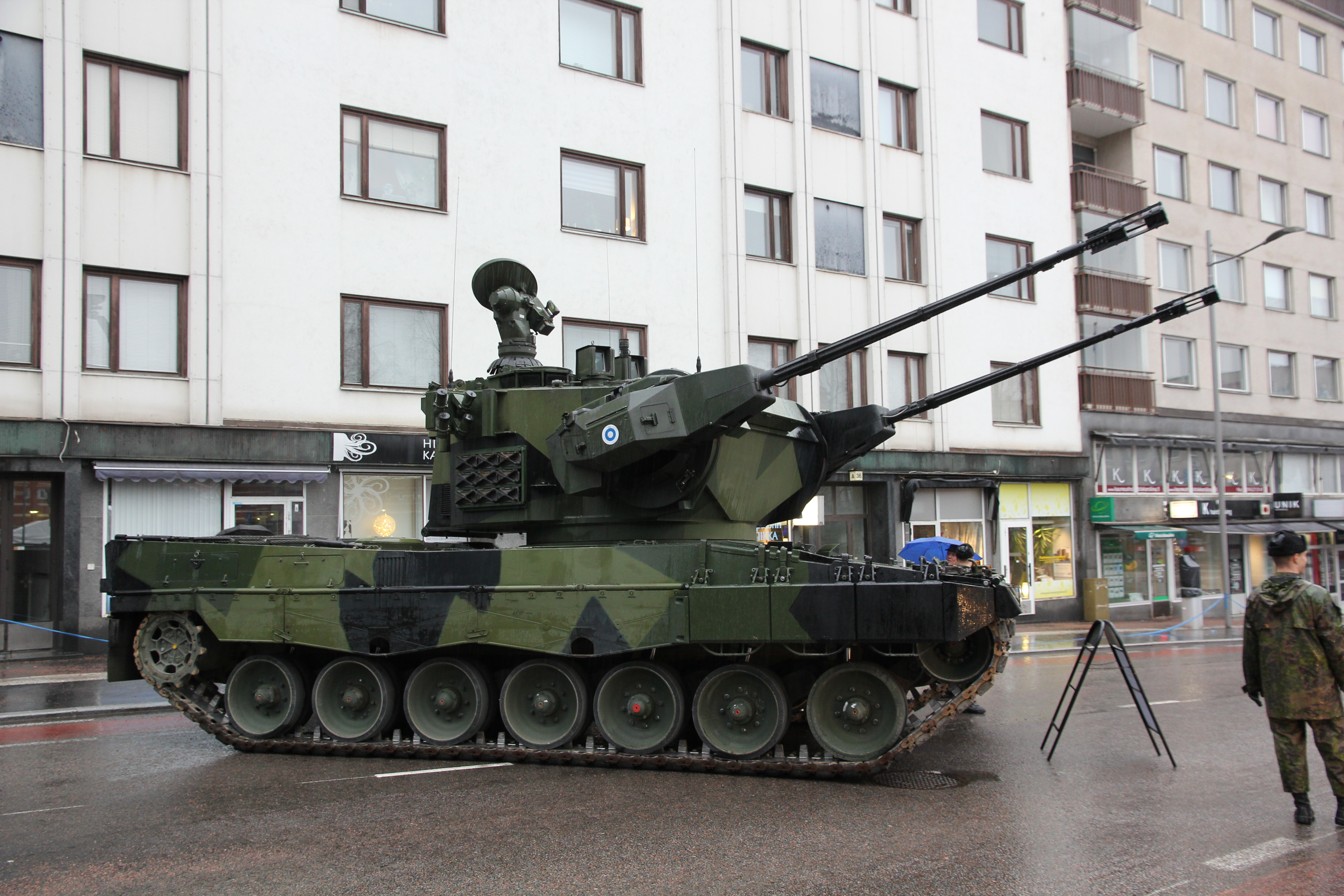
Finnish ITPSV Leopard 2 Marksman

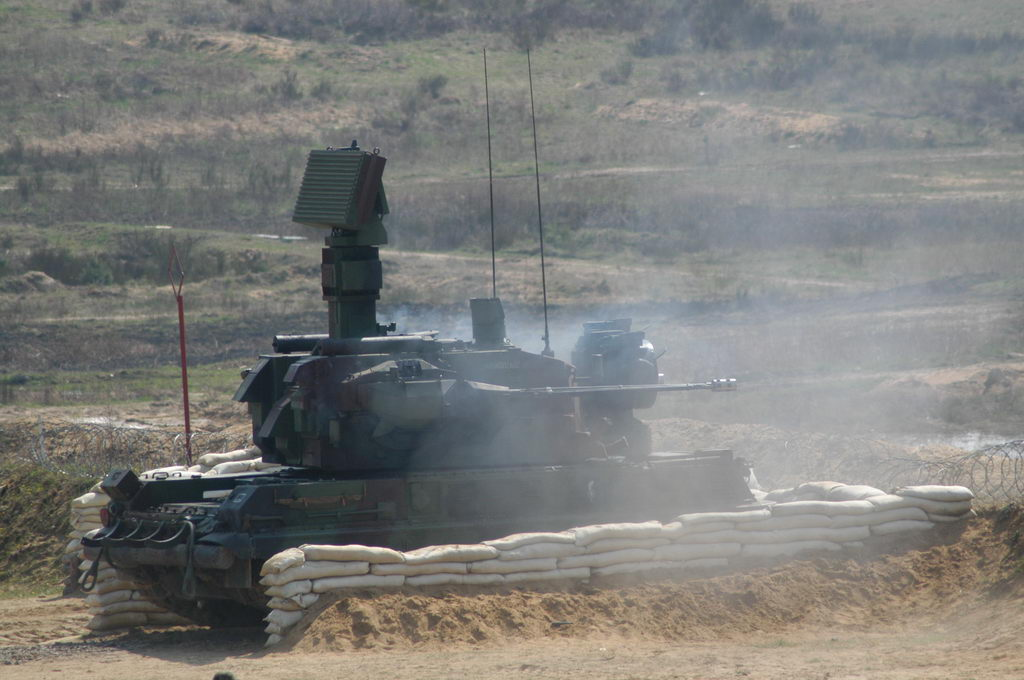
The PZA Loara-A anti-aircraft vehicle

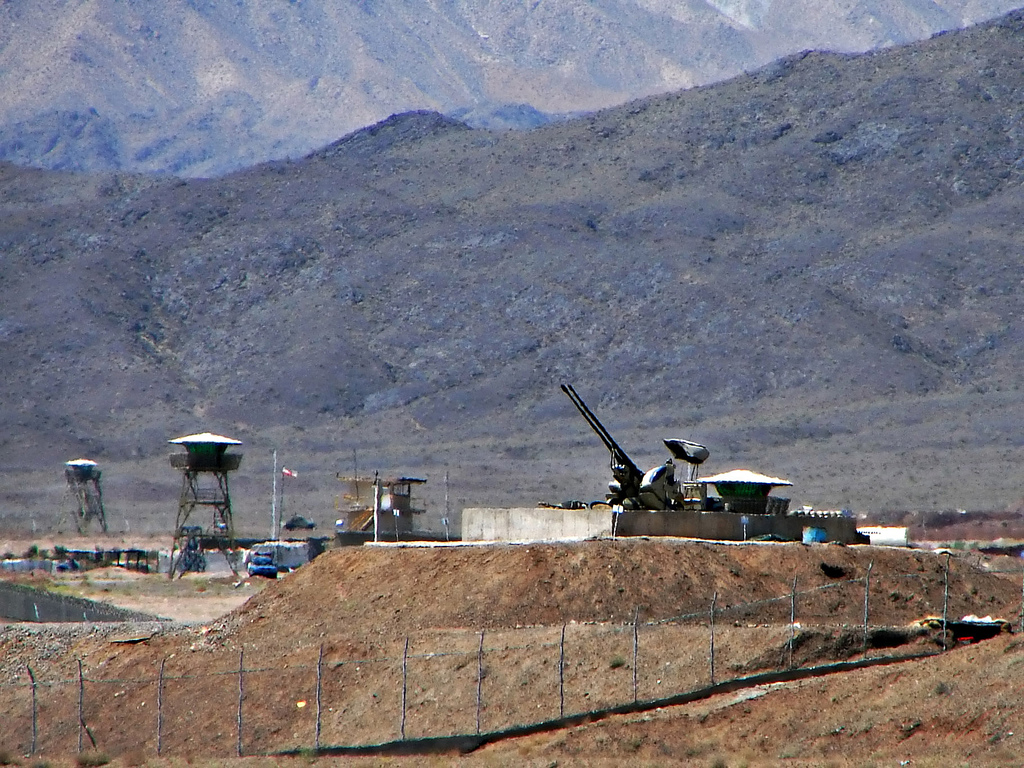
Samavat near Natanz Nuclear Facility

- GDF-001 / 2 ZLA/353 MK: XABA sight
- GDF-002: Introduced in 1980. Improved Ferranti sight and digital data bus. The gun has 112 rounds ready and 126 in reserve (238 rounds total)
- GDF-003: Minor enhancements including protective covers and automatic weapon lubrication.
- GDF-005: Introduced in 1985. Fitted with Gunking 3D computer-controlled sight with a laser range finder and digital fire control system. Integrated power supply and diagnostics. 280 rounds on the gun and an automatic re-loading system.
- GDF-006: GDF-001/002/003 upgraded with AHEAD system.
- GDF-007: GDF-005 upgraded with AHEAD system.
- GDF-009: Unveiled at IDEF 2015, held in May 2015 in Istanbul. To date, its exterior significantly changed, although the installation has retained the design of the original serial versions of the systems. Unlike other variants, this one relies on an internal power source. The GDF-009 model is based on a four-wheeled carriage, and is raised off the ground by three stabilisers when deployed in the firing position. It also features an automatic levelling system that can compensate for a maximum tilt angle of up to 7°. Mounted on the forward part of the carriage is the integrated battery, which functions as the gun's power supply unit and can be recharged from an external source if required.
- AHEAD: An upgrade for the GDF series guns built around a special projectile which explodes at a pre-calculated point in front of the target, sending a cone of 152 tungsten sub-projectiles at the target. Used by Canada, Pakistan, Greece, Oman, Spain, Taiwan, and Chile (unconfirmed).
- MKE GDF-003B: Turkish version of 35 mm GDF series. The gun of the system manufactured under licence by Turkish company Mechanical and Chemical Industry Corporation.
- MKE/Aselsan GDF-003B Modernized: MKE GDF-003B system modernized by another Turkish company Aselsan. MKE made 35 mm guns linked with an Aselsan made Fire and Command Control System. The system has similarities with Skyguard system. The Fire and Command Control System consists of Aselsan made 3D search radar, fire control radar, electro-optical (E/O) sensors and other electronics. Each weapons system can fire up to 1100 rpm (2 x 550rpm) to an effective range of 4 km. The upgradation enables the system to fire Aselsan ATOM 35mm airburst round which explodes at a pre-calculated point in front of the target, sending a cone of tungsten pellets at the target. The gun can also fire HEI and TP-T ammunitions. The concept of ATOM 35mm air burst ammunition came up in order to increase the efficiency of the gun systems against modern targets including fixed/rotary wing aircraft, cruise missiles, air-to-ground missiles and unmanned aerial vehicles and other precision guided weapons. Aselsan Fire and Command Control system can also incorporate a low altitude air defense SAM along with 35 mm gun platform. Like the GDF-009 each gun platform equipped with the integrated battery, which functions as the gun's power supply unit and can be recharged from an external source if required.
- KORKUT: Turkish Self-propelled (SPAAG) variant designed by Aselsan. The system developed from modernized GDF-003B and based around the amphibious capable FNSS ACV-30. KDC-02 cannon of the system manufactured under licence by MKE. Each Korkut system comprises a command-and-control vehicle and three weapons platform vehicles. The command-and-control vehicle has the 3D search radar with an effective radar range of 70 km. Each weapon platform vehicle carries enclosed twin 35 mm cannons, fire control radar and electro-optical (E/O) sensors.
- Aselsan GOKDENIZ: CIWS version of KORKUT. The system's primary purpose is to defend against sea skimming anti-ship missiles, unmanned aerial vehicles and other precision guided weapons.
- Gepard: Self-propelled (SPAAG) version of the system based around the Leopard 1.
- Marksman: Self-propelled version of the system based around the Marksman turret, which could be fitted on numerous tank chassis. The only model that went into production was a version based on the T-55AM chassis for Finland, seven systems of the ITPSV 90 Marksman were produced. After having been moved to reserve storage since 2010, the Marksman turrets had their electronics modernized and were transferred over to Leopard 2 chassis in 2015, creating the ITPSV Leopard 2 Marksman.
- Type 87: Japanese SPAAG using the system.
- PZA Loara: Polish SPAAG based on the PT-91 tank.
- Type 90 (PG99): Chinese licensed copy of GDF-002. The PG99 is a towed anti-aircraft gun suitable for point and coastal air defence. It is usually deployed near military bases, airfields, tunnels, islands, and along the coast to defend Sea Land of Communication (SLOC), ports, bridges and other important assets.
- MAA-01: Myanmar's locally made variant using Chinese GDF guns.Similar to Type-90.
- CS/SA1: Chinese upgrade of GDF-002. Mounted on the 6×6 SX2190 truck, the PG99 (CS/SA1) is a self-propelled variant of the Type 90 35 mm AA system, previously available only as a towed AA piece.
- Type 09 SPAAA: Self-propelled version of the system based around the Type 90. First appeared in 2015 China Victory Day Parade.
- Samavat: Iranian version of these guns with night vision sight and used with Skyguard & Super Fledermaus FC radars.
- Amoun: Egyptian version of Skyguard & Sparrow SAM.

== Operators ==
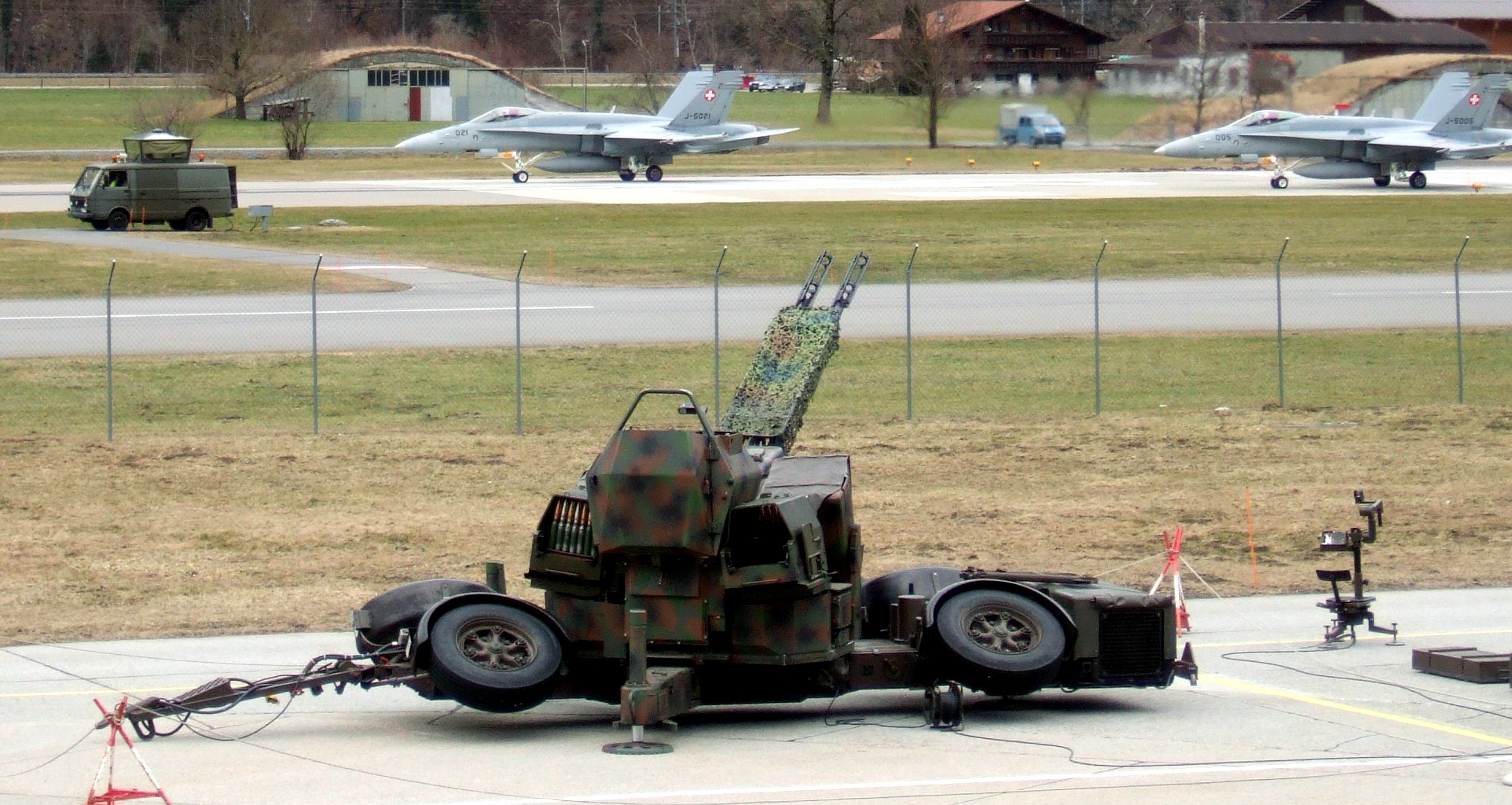
A deployed Swiss GDF-005

- Argentina: 38 GDF-002 Army with Skyguard, 6 GDF-001 Air Force with Super Fledermaus FC radar.
- Austria: 74 GDF-005 Army, Air Force 18 GDF-005 with 37 Skyguard FC radar
- Bahrain: 12 GDF-005 units, used with Skyguard FC radar.
- Bangladesh: 4-8 Oerlikon GDF-009 anti aircraft gun systems have been ordered with Skyguard 3 fire control radar. In 2019, the gun systems have been tested at Cox's Bazar.
- Brazil: 38 GDF-001, being gradually phased out in favor of the EMADS as of 2026.
- Cameroon: GDF-002 and Type 90 units
- Canada: 20 GDF-005 units and 10 Skyguard FC radars in stock for emergency
- Chile: 24 GDF-005/007 units, used with Skyguard FC radar.
- China: licensed copy of GDF-002 as the Type 90, 400 units with Skyguard FC radar
  Oerlikon as part of the Skyguard system of the Cyprus National Guard
  Colombia: 75 GDF-005 units in reserve
- Cyprus: 24 GDF-005 units used with Skyguard and Aspide SAM (Othellos System)
- Ecuador: 30 GDF-003 units
- Egypt: 72 Amoun units used with Skyguard and Sparrow SAM
- Finland: 16 units. Known as 35 ITK 88
- Germany: On the Flugabwehrkanonenpanzer Gepard (self-propelled anti-aircraft gun), 4 Skyguard FC radars used to monitor low level flying.
- Greece: 24 GDF-002 units upgraded to GDF-006 AHEAD, 12 upgraded Skyguard FC radars, used with Sparrow SAM
- Iran: 92 GDF-002 units. Iran produces its own version called Samavat. Used with Skyguard & Super Fledermaus FC radars.
- Indonesia: 4 Type 90 units used with AF-902 Skyguard FC radar. Used by the Indonesian Marine Corps.
- Japan: some 70 GDF-001 units, used with updated Super Fledermaus FC radars. Made under a joint venture with Japan Steel Works for the 35 mm gun and Mitsubishi Electric Corporation for the rest of the system 52 On the Type 87 (self-propelled anti-aircraft gun)
- South Korea: 36 GDF-003 units, used with Skyguard FC radar.
- Kuwait: 12 GDF-005 (Amoun) units, used with Skyguard and Sparrow SAM
- Malaysia: 28 GDF-005 units, used with Skyguard FC radar.
- Myanmar: unknown number of locally made MAA-01 (Type 90) in service.
- Nigeria: 16 GDF-002 units
- Oman: 10 GDF-005 units AHEAD modified, used with Skyguard FC radar.
- Pakistan: 250 GDF-002 & GDF-005 units, 60 units AHEAD modified, used with 134 Skyguard FC radar.
- Romania: 43 Flugabwehrkanonenpanzer Gepard systems and 72 GDF-003 units
- Saudi Arabia: 128 GDF-005 modified units. Used with Skyguard FC radars.
- Singapore: 58 units : 34 GDF-001 and 24 GDF-002 units. Fire-control radar locally upgraded
- South Africa: 102 GDF-002 (100 Mk1 GDF-002 units in 2004 were sold for $500 000) + 48 modified GDF-005 units. Upgrading to the Skyshield system, GDF-006 AHEAD and GDF-007 AHEAD standard by 2017. Some 169 Oerlikon GDF-00? were acquired by the SADF along with 75 Super Fledermaus FC radars.
- Spain: 92 GDF-007 upgraded from GDF-005 between 2003 and 2006. With 27 Skydor and 18 Skyguard FC radars.
- Switzerland: Some 45 GDF-007 modified units (from a total of 264 GDF-001/002 units) used with Skyguard FC Radar.
- Taiwan: 24 Skyguard "Sky Sentinel" fire control radars linked to some 50 GDF-003 35 mm twin guns. Upgraded to GDF-006 to fire AHEAD rounds since 2009.
- Thailand: 8 GDF-007, used with 4x Skyguard 3 FC radar units.
- Turkey: 35 mm Oerlikon gun produced under licence by MKE. 120 GDF-003 units, Turkish version known as MKE GDF-003B. Multiple gun systems upgraded to GDF-003B Modernized with Aselsan Fire and Command Control System by Aselsan.
- Ukraine: 30 on the Flugabwehrkanonenpanzer Gepard SPAAGs.
- United Arab Emirates: 30 GDF-005 units
- United Kingdom: 15 GDF-002 35mm twin guns were captured during the Falklands War along with six Skyguard and one Super Fledermaus FC Radars. Currently four of these Skyguard fire control systems are being used to detect UK military aircraft exceeding flight restrictions over residential areas. GDF-002 guns now in storage and in a few military museums in the UK.

== Combat History ==
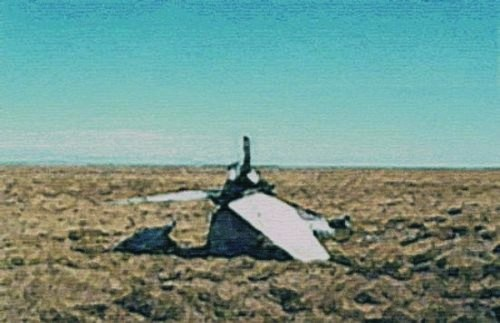
Remains of Harrier XZ988, shot down on 27 May

1982: The system was widely used by the Armed Forces of Argentina during the Falklands War. The Skyguard radar system was employed by the 601 Antiaircraft Artillery Group and the Super Fledermaus by the 1st Group of the Argentine Air Force. This force shot down a Sea Harrier (XZ450) on 4 May 1982 at Goose Green, prompting British aircraft to operate beyond its range. An RAF Harrier (XZ988) was also shot down on 27 May and another, (XW919) was damaged by 35 mm splinters over Sapper Hill on 12 June.

The system was used in a direct fire role during the Battle of Goose Green, killing two, wounding 11. and at Wireless Ridge shortly before the Argentine surrender.

The weapons were involved in two friendly fire incidents. On 1 May 1982, a GADA 601 battery shot down a combat-damaged Argentine Mirage III (I-019) near Stanley Airfield, killing its pilot, Captain Gustavo Cuerva. The second occurred on 24 May 1982, when a Douglas A-4 Skyhawk (C-244) entered a restricted zone over Goose Green and was shot down, killing the pilot, Lieutenant Gavazzi.

Skyguard radars were targeted by the RAF during Operation Black Buck on 31 May and 3 June. One radar was destroyed by Shrike missile shrapnel, killing four operators.

British forces captured 15 guns and six Skyguard units, later refurbished in "Operation Skyguard". BMARC restored the GDF-002 AA guns at Grantham, while Rheinmetall/Oerlikon refurbished four radars in Germany. Twelve guns and four radars entered RAF service with 1339 Wing Royal Auxiliary Air Force, operated by 2729 and 2890 Squadrons at RAF Waddington. Two more Skyguard units were procured. Budget cuts and maintenance costs eventually forced their retirement. One gun is on display at the RAF Regiment Heritage Centre, RAF Honington. The Skyguard system is still used by the RAF to monitor low-level flights.

12 October 2007: A malfunctioning GDF-005 killed nine and injured 14 SANDF soldiers during an exercise at Lohatla, Northern Cape. The gun jammed, then entered automatic mode and fired a burst while traversing uncontrollably. A 2008 SANDF report blamed a sheared spring pin, while others cited poor training.

May 2025: The Pakistan Army Air Defence Corps deployed their Oerlikon GDF-002s during the 2025 India–Pakistan conflict. India launched numerous IAI Harop drones, with Pakistani defences reportedly downing 77.

== See also ==
- List of artillery
- List of anti-aircraft artillery
- List of artillery of Germany
- List of artillery of Switzerland

Related development

- Oerlikon Millennium 35 mm Naval Revolver Gun System
- Type 09 SPAAA
