= PGZ-09 =

Type 09 SPAAA
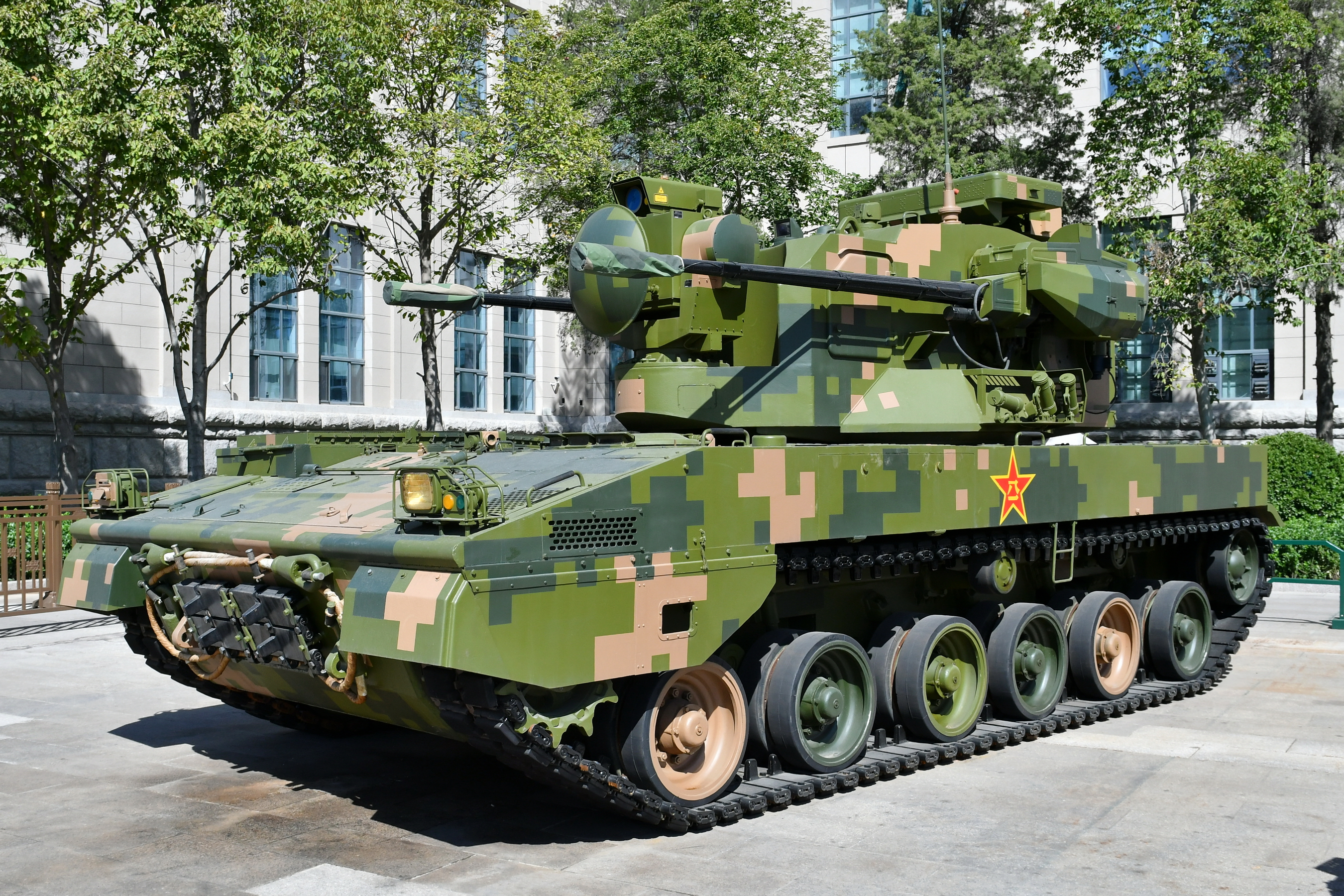
- A Type 09 SPAAA at Theme Exhibition of the 90th Anniversary of Chinese People's Liberation Army.
- Type: Self-propelled anti-aircraft gun
- Place of origin: China

Service history
- In service: 2009-present

Production history
- Designer: Northwest Institute of Mechanical & Electrical Engineering
- Manufacturer: Norinco
- Produced: 2007-present

Specifications
- Mass: 35 tons
- Length: 6.7 m (20 ft)
- Width: 3.2 m (10 ft 6 in)
- Height: 3.4 m (11 ft 2 in) (radar down); 4.82 m (15 ft 10 in) (radar up)
- Crew: 3
- Caliber: 35 mm
- Rate of fire: 1100 rounds/min
- Maximum firing range: 5 km
- Main armament: 2 × PG99 35 mm autocannon 2 to 4 infrared guided MANPADS (optional)
- Secondary armament: 2 × 3 smoke dischargers
- Engine: 8V150 diesel 800 hp (597 kW)
- Power/weight: 22.85 hp/tonne
- Suspension: torsion bar and hydropneumatic suspension
- Operational range: 450 km (280 mi)
- Maximum speed: 55 km/h (34 mph)

The Type 09 (PLA military designation: PGZ09 – Chinese: 09式自行高射炮; pinyin: 09 shì zì xíng gāoshèpào, "Type 09 self-propelled anti-aircraft artillery") is a Chinese self-propelled anti-aircraft vehicle manufactured by Norinco. It is armed with two 35 millimeter cannons and optionally two to four fire-and-forget infrared homing missiles. It started to gradually replace the predecessor Type 95 in 2009. Some military analysts designated the vehicle as Type 07, but the official designation was confirmed as Type 09 on the Theme Exhibition of the 90th Anniversary of Chinese People's Liberation Army in 2017.

== History ==
In 1987, China imported the Oerlikon GDF-002 with manufacture licenses, which was designated as Type 90 twin 35 mm anti-aircraft gun systems in China. Type 90 is mainly designed to engage low-flying target such as Close air support aircraft, helicopters, unmanned aerial vehicles (UAV) and cruise missiles. Type 09 is the self-propelled version of Type 90.

== Design ==
Type 09 utilizes a tracked chassis similar to PLZ-05, which is powered by an 8V150 diesel engine with 800 hp. The chassis features six roadwheels with combined torsion bar and hydropneumatic suspension system and CH700 manual transmission. The tracked design and 800hp engine allows for a road speed of up to 55 km/h. The turret is made of welded steel armor that protects the crew from small arms fire and shell splinters. Over the frontal arc the armor is rated to withstand 14.5mm heavy machine gun round.

The main armaments are PG-99 (Type 90) twin-barrel anti-aircraft guns. The twin-barrel artillery has a combined cyclic rate of 1100 rounds per minute. The vehicle can choose from five types of ammunition before engagement, including HEI (High Explosive Incendiary) with tracer variant, SAPHEI (Semi-armor-piercing high-explosive incendiary) with tracer variant, armor-piercing discarding sabot, programmable Air burst and Target Practice Tracer. The turret has two separate loading mechanism for each barrel.

The vehicle features two types of radar. The search and surveillance radar (Doppler radar) is located at the rear of the turret roof which has a reported range of 20 kilometers with identification friend or foe capability. The tracking radar is mounted in front of the turret with digital fire control system above. It is equipped with a computer-controlled targeting system with laser range finder and thermal-tracking sight. An emergency daylight optics is situated on top of the turret. A digital fire control system and auto-loader is situated in the rear of the vehicle. Other standard equipment for Type 09 includes air-conditioning for crew and computers, heating and ventilation, and an NBC system that provides protection against the effects of nuclear, biological and chemical weapons. Type 09 also has an automatic fire detection and suppression system, data-link and external communications system with other vehicles in the battalion.

== Operators ==
China

- People's Liberation Army Ground Force: Standard air defenses vehicle for PLA Ground Force combined arms brigades.

== See also ==
- PGZ-95
- Oerlikon GDF
- Flakpanzer Gepard
- Type 87
- Marksman
