= Flakpanzer Gepard =

Flugabwehrkanonenpanzer Gepard
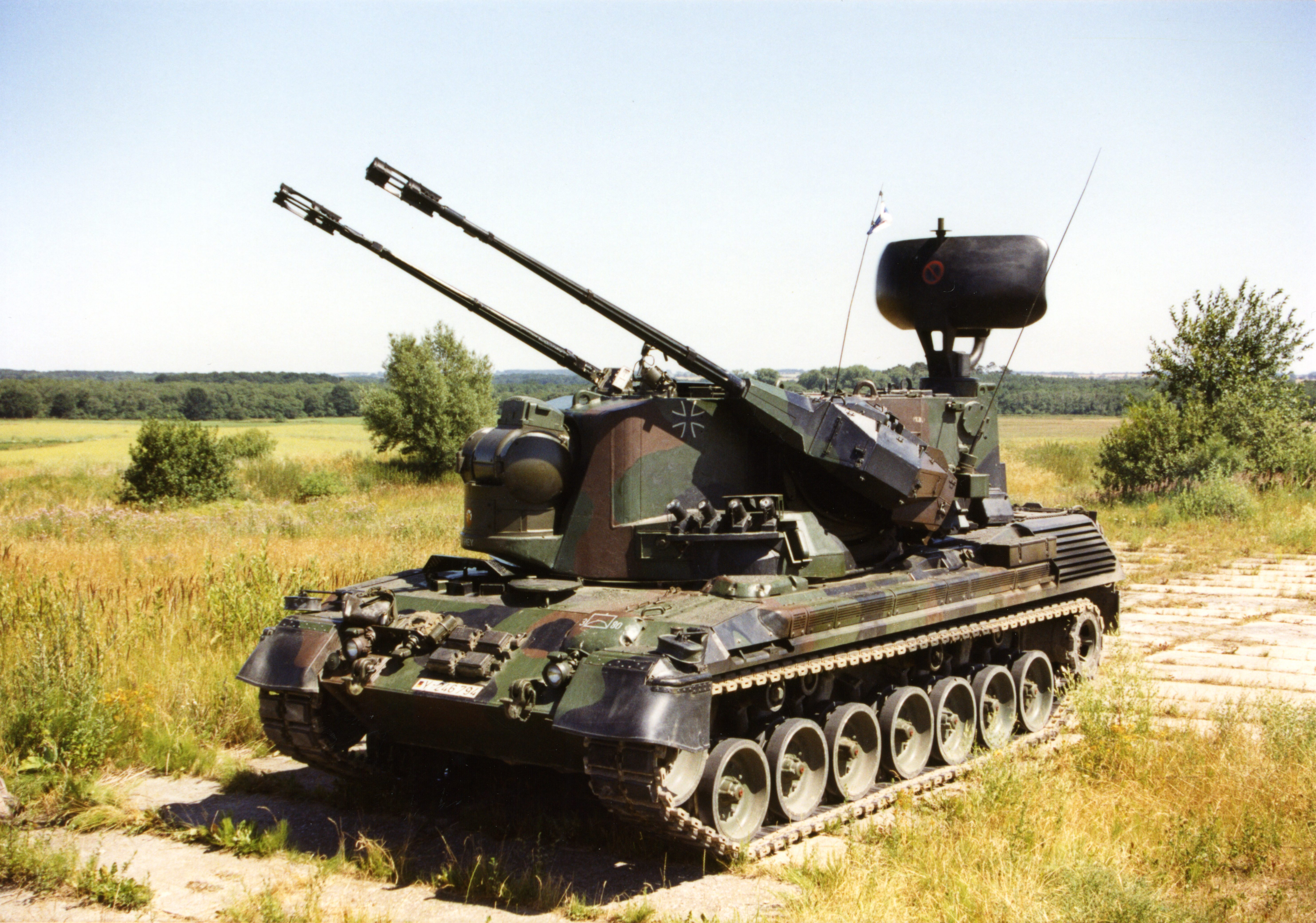
- Gepard 1A1 of the German Army
- Type: Self-propelled anti-aircraft gun
- Place of origin: Switzerland; West Germany

Service history
- In service: 1976–present
- Used by: See Operators
- Wars: Russo-Ukrainian War

Production history
- Designer: Oerlikon-Bührle AG (Switzerland); Contraves (Switzerland); Siemens-Albis AG (Switzerland); Krauss-Maffei AG (vehicle - West Germany)
- Manufacturer: Krauss-Maffei AG (licence production)

Specifications
- Mass: 47.5 t (46.7 long tons; 52.4 short tons)
- Length: Overall: 7.68 m (25 ft 2 in)
- Width: 3.71 m (12 ft 2 in)
- Height: Radar retracted: 3.29 m (10 ft 10 in)
- Crew: 3 (driver, gunner, commander)
- Armor: conventional steel
- Main armament: 2 × 35 mm Oerlikon GDF autocannon, each with 320 rounds anti-air ammunition and 20 rounds anti-tank
- Secondary armament: 2 × quad 76 mm smoke grenade dischargers
- Engine: 10-cylinder, 37,400 cc (2,280 cu in) MTU multi-fuel engine 830 PS (819 hp, 610 kW)
- Power/weight: 17.5 PS/t
- Suspension: Torsion bar suspension
- Operational range: 550 km (340 mi)
- Maximum speed: 65 km/h (40 mph)

The Flugabwehrkanonenpanzer Gepard ("anti-aircraft-gun tank 'Cheetah'", also known as Flakpanzer Gepard) is an all-weather-capable West German self-propelled anti-aircraft gun (SPAAG) based on the hull of the Leopard 1. It was developed in the 1960s, fielded in the 1970s, and has been upgraded several times with the latest electronics. It has been a cornerstone of the air defence of the German Army (Bundeswehr) and a number of other NATO countries.

In Germany, the Gepard was phased out in late 2010 and replaced by the Wiesel 2 Ozelot Leichtes Flugabwehrsystem (LeFlaSys) with four FIM-92 Stinger or (proposed) LFK NG missile launchers. A variant with the MANTIS gun system and LFK NG missiles, based on the GTK Boxer, was also considered.

The Gepard has been widely used in combat in the Russo-Ukrainian War, mostly to shoot down drones.

== Developmental history ==
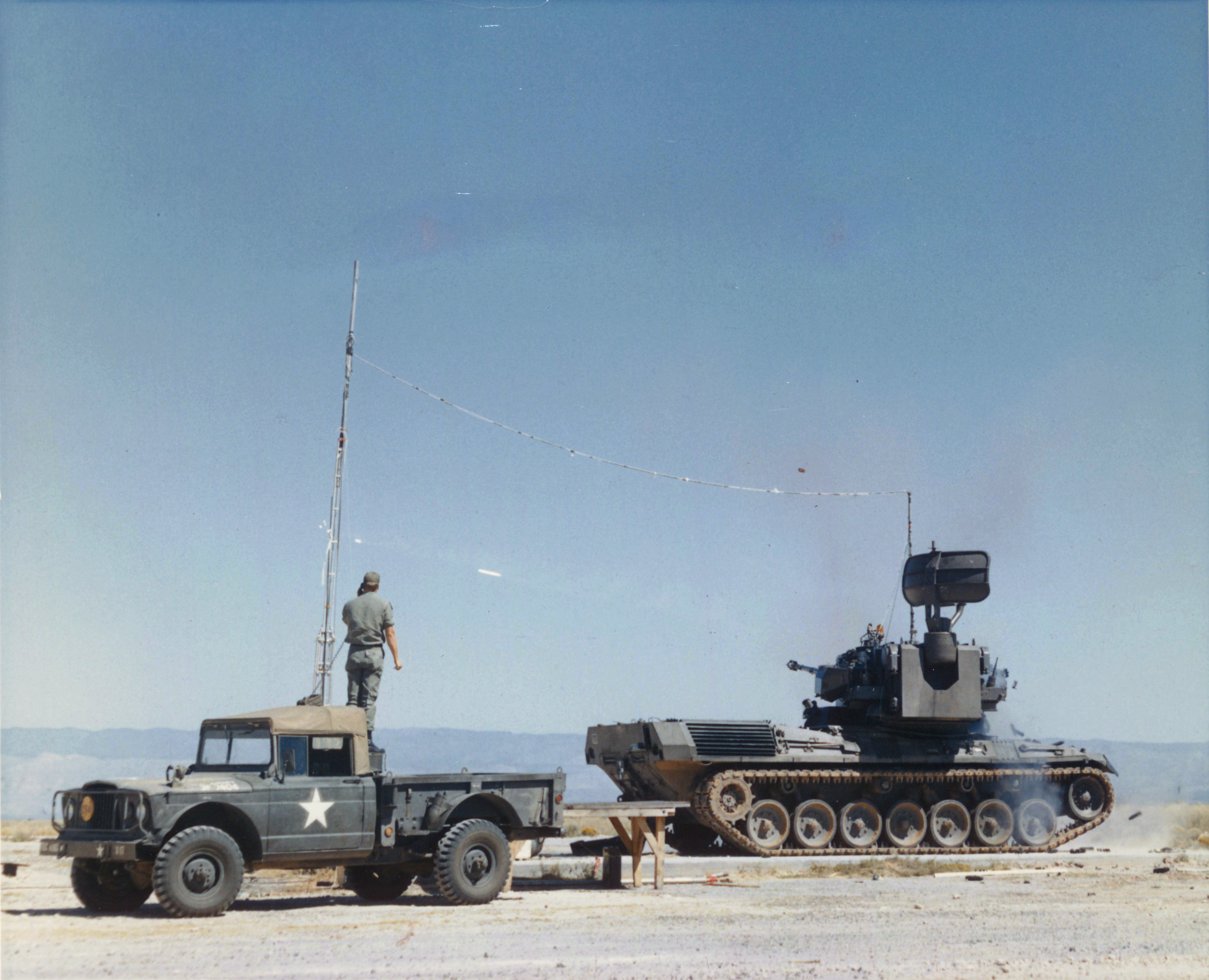
Early Gepard system during trials in the US

The Gepard was developed during the 1960s as a replacement for the M42 Duster. Two projects were investigated. These were the ‘Matador’ (designed by Rheinmetall, AEG, Siemensi, and Krauss-Maffei) and the ‘5PFZ-A’ (designed by Oerlikon, Contraves, Siemens-Albis, Hollandse Signaalapparaten and Kraus-Maffei/Porsche). In 1969, construction began of four A prototypes testing both 30 and 35 mm guns. In June 1970, it was decided to use the 35 mm type. In 1971, twelve second phase B prototypes were ordered. In 1971 the Dutch army ordered a CA preseries of five vehicles based on a parallel development that had used a West German 0-series Leopard 1 vehicle made available by the West German government in March 1970 as the C-prototype.

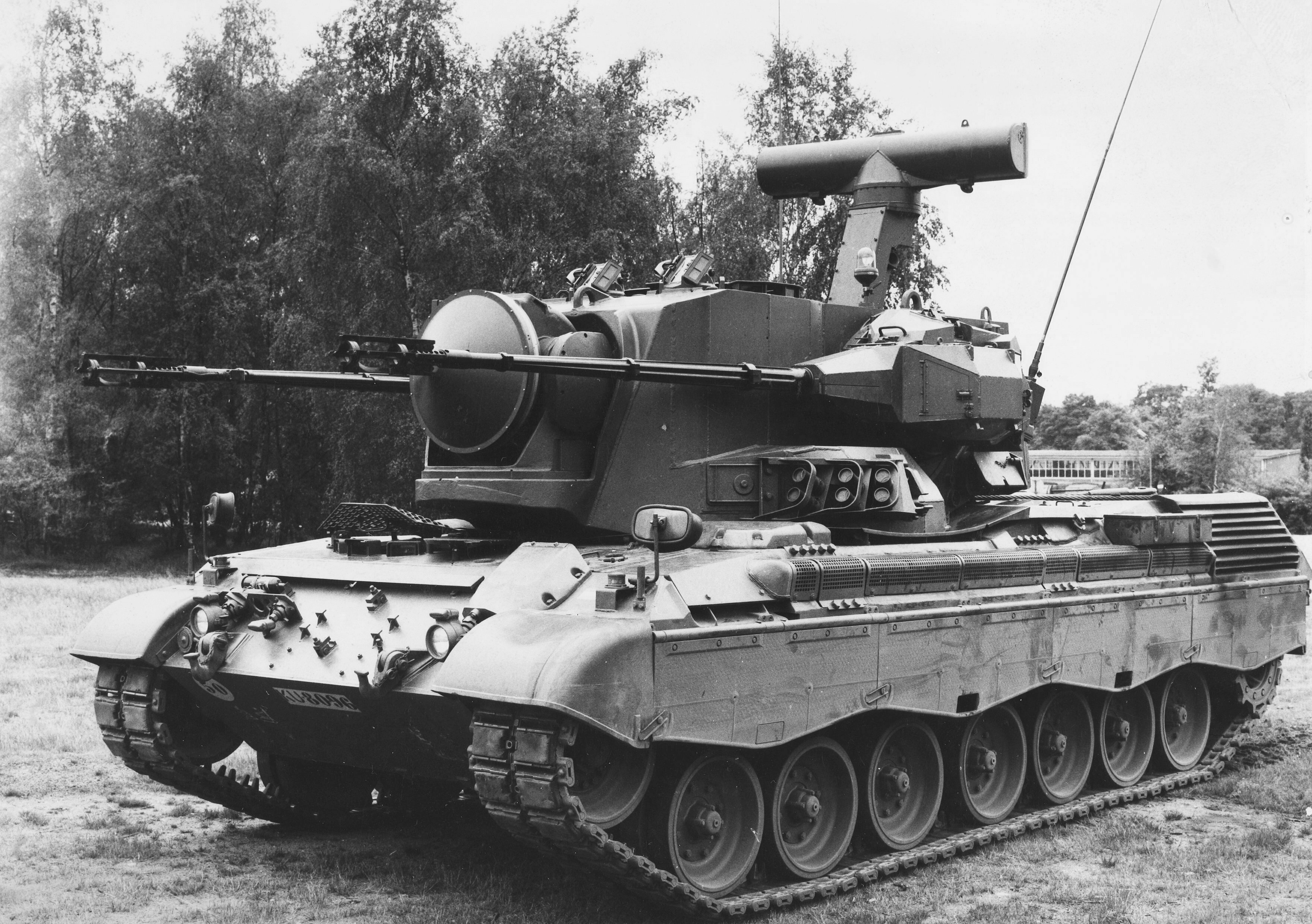
Early pre-series vehicle on trial for the Royal Netherlands Army in 1976.

German companies produced a small preseries of both the B1 and B2R. In February 1973, the political decision was made to produce the type. In September 1973, the contract was signed with Krauss-Maffei for 432 B2 turrets and 420 hulls with a total value of DM 1,200,000,000. Each Gepard would be about three times the price of a normal Leopard 1. The first was delivered in December 1976. Belgium ordered 55 vehicles, which were identical to the German version. The Netherlands ordered 95 vehicles (designated Cheetah PRTL or Pantser Rups Tegen Luchtdoelen), split into three batches (CA1, CA2 and CA3), which were equipped with Philips radar systems.

Since the 1980s, Redeye and later Stinger MANPADS teams have been accompanying the Gepard units to take advantage of their long-range scanning capacity. To combine this capacity in a single unit, a missile system upgrade that mounts the Stingers in twin packs to the autocannons was developed. The system was tested by the German Bundeswehr but not bought due to budget restrictions. Instead, the Ozelot Light Air Defence System (LeFlaSys) was fielded for the three Airborne Brigades. The 1st Airborne Division (de:1. Luftlandedivision (Bundeswehr)) had three Brigades: 25th (in Calw), 26th (in Saarlouis) and 27th Airborne Brigade.

== Technology and systems ==
The vehicle is based on the hull of the Leopard 1 tank with a large fully rotating turret carrying the armament—a pair of 35 mm Oerlikon KDA autocannons.

=== Chassis and propulsion ===
The Gepard is based on a slightly modified chassis of the Leopard 1 main battle tank, including the complete drive unit with a 37.4-liter 10-cylinder multi-fuel engine (type: MB 838 CaM 500) with two mechanical superchargers. The V-engine with a cylinder angle of 90 degrees has 610 kW at 2200 RPM (830 PS) and consumes—depending on the surface and driving style—around 150 liters per 100 kilometers. To ensure a steady supply of oil, even in difficult terrain and under extreme skew, the engine is provided with a dry sump forced lubrication. Even the gearbox (type: 4 HP-250) from ZF Friedrichshafen and the exhaust system with fresh air admixture to reduce the infrared signature were taken from the Leopard 1 main battle tank.

The Gepard is equipped with a Daimler-Benz (type: OM 314) 4-cylinder diesel auxiliary engine for the energy supply system. This engine is on the front left of the vehicle, located where the Leopard 1 has an ammunition magazine. The engine, which has a 3.8 liter capacity, is designed as a multi-fuel engine and produces 66 kW (90 PS). It consumes between 10 and 20 liters per hour, depending on the operational status of the tank.

The auxiliary engine is coupled with five generators to operate at different speeds: Two Metadyn machines in tandem with a flywheel (which is used to store energy during the acceleration and deceleration of the turret) for the power of the elevation and traverse drives, two 380 Hz three-phase generators with a capacity of 20 kVA for the ventilation, fire-control and radar systems, and a 300 A 28 volt direct current generator for the electrical system. The fuel capacity is 985 liters, which ensures a combined operating time of approximately 48 hours.

The chassis and the track were taken directly from the Leopard 1. It has torsion bar spring-mounted roadwheels with seven roadwheel pairs per side. They are connected to the torsion bars on swing arms, whose deflection is limited by volute springs. Drive is through the drive sprockets located at the rear.

The rubber-mounted shocks were modified to achieve better stability during firing. The track is manufactured by the company Diehl, rubber track pads fitted, and is "live" track with rubber bushings between the track links and pins (type: D 640 A). Grouser/icecleats can replace the rubber pads on some track links to increase traction on slippery surfaces.

The hull only had slight modifications, e.g., a modified roadwheel distance (8 cm increased distance between the third and fourth roadwheel) and the transfer of additional batteries in battery boxes at the rear. The batteries and the electrical system operate at 24 volts DC.

=== Radar and laser ===
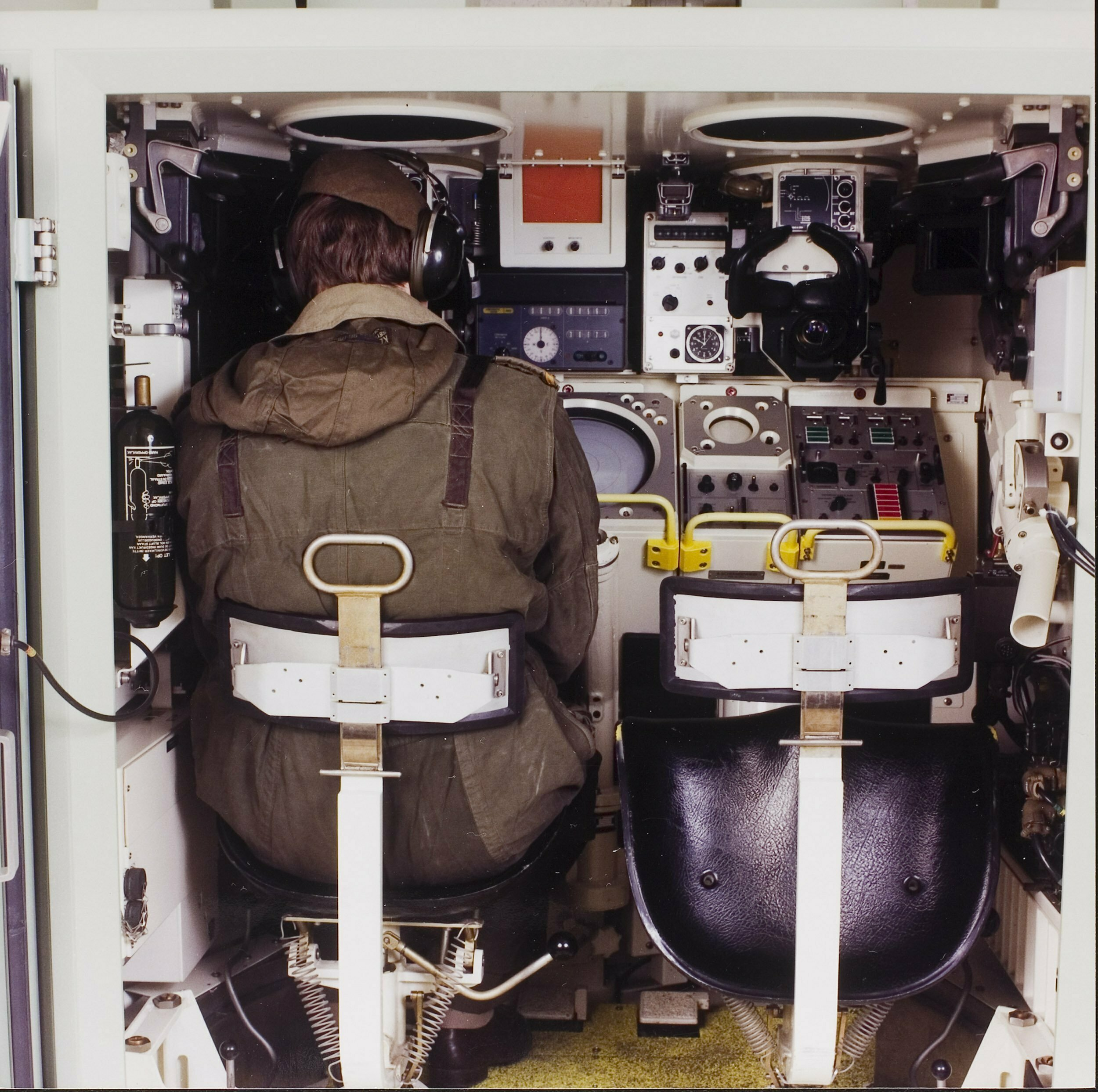
The commander (left) and gunner's (right) positions in a Dutch Cheetah PRTL. Each crewmember has his own optical periscope and share a single, centre-mounted display for the surveillance radar.

Vehicles delivered to the German Bundeswehr and Belgium were equipped with a Siemens MPDR 12 S-band search radar installed on a swing arm (lowered behind the turret for transit) on the rear of the turret, which provides a 15 km hemispherical detection range and has an integrated MSR 400 Mk XII interrogator for automated target discrimination. The K_{u} band tracking radar also developed by Siemens-Albis has a 15 km range and is mounted at the front of the turret, between the guns; its dome-covered antenna is mounted on a powered base which can traverse in a 180° arc. Additionally, the Gepard has a back-up optical sighting system for passive target acquisition and engagement, consisting of two stabilized, panoramic periscopes for both gunner and commander, with a variable magnification (1.5× and a field of view of 50° and 6× magnification with a narrow, 12.5° FOV). These periscopes can be mechanically engaged by the tracking radar and automatically aimed at the target for preliminary identification. A laser rangefinder was provided on vehicles upgraded to the B2L standard, and installed atop the antenna housing for the tracking radar.

=== Guns ===
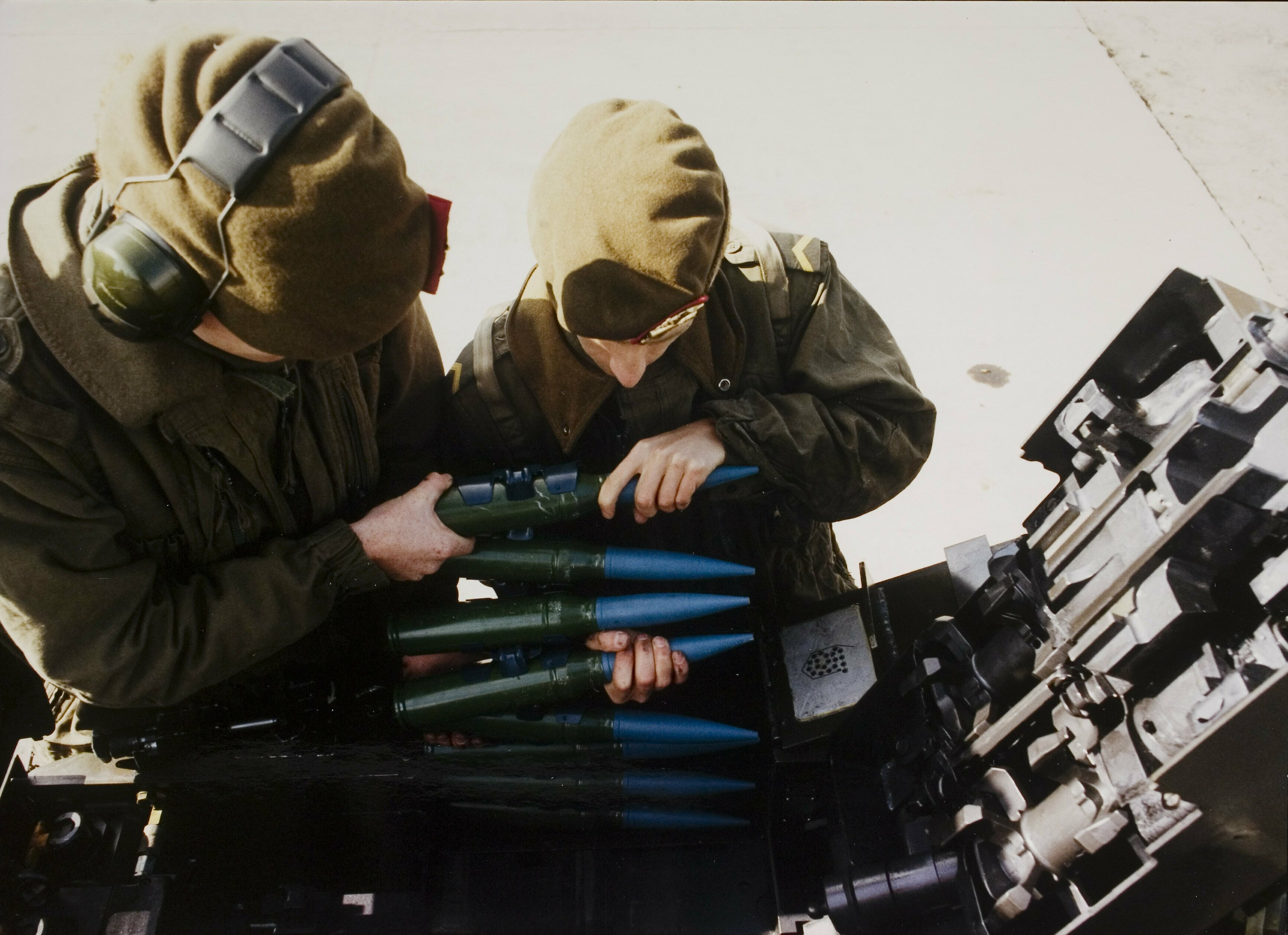
Technicians reload a Dutch PRTL with linked 35 mm ammunition.

The Gepard utilizes two Oerlikon GDF, 90 calibres (3.15 m (10 ft 4 in)) long, with a muzzle velocity of 1,440 m/s (4,700 ft/s) (FAPDS (Frangible Armour Piercing Discarding Sabot) rounds), giving an effective range of 5.5 km (3.4 miles). The ammunition is 35×228mm calibre (STANAG 4516).

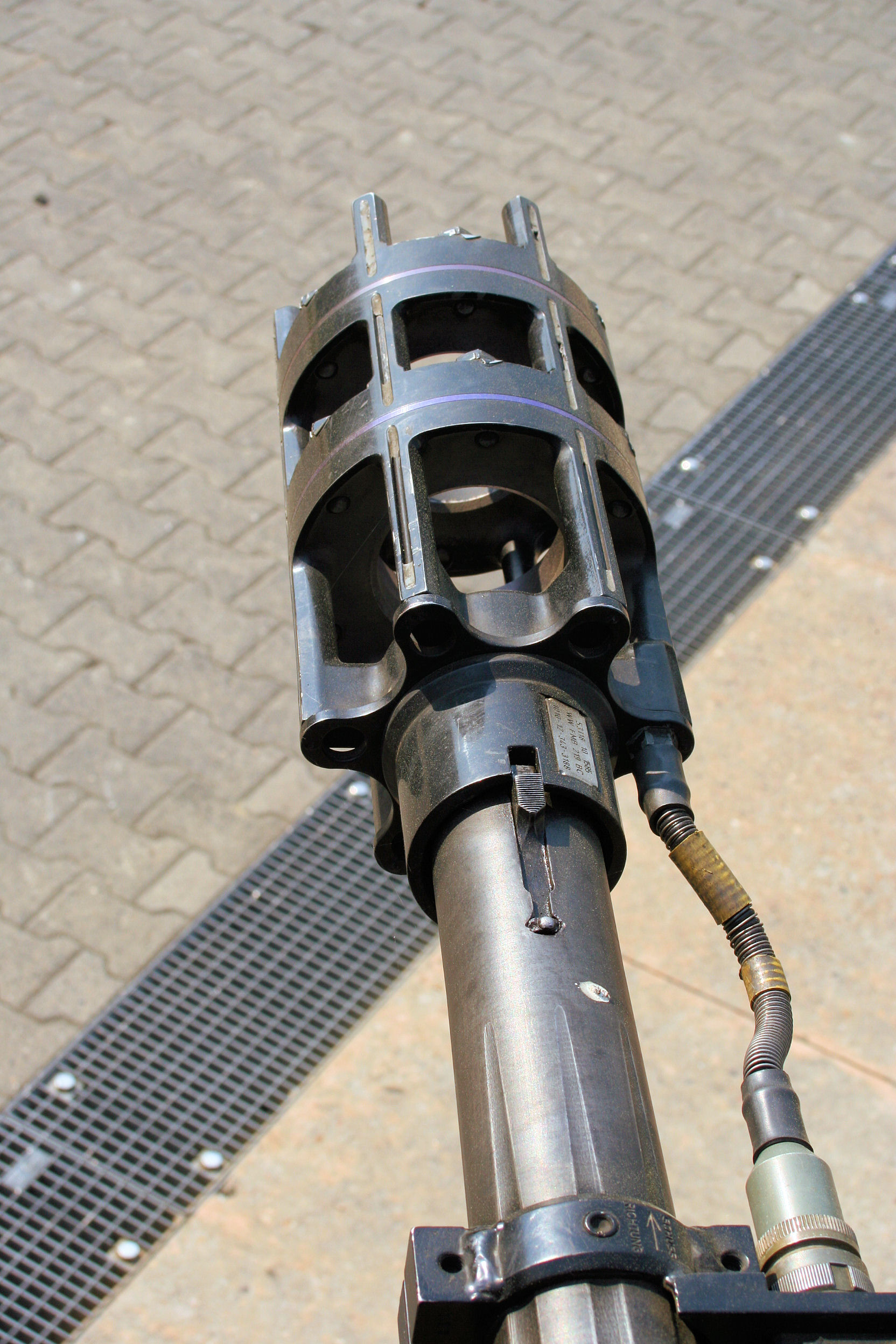
A closeup of the gun muzzle and the projectile velocity sensor

The KDA autocannon has a dual belt feed for two different ammunition types; the usual loading per gun is 320 AA rounds fed from inside the turret and 20 AP rounds fed from a small outlying storage. The 40 armour-piercing rounds are normally fired singly with the guns alternating; they are also intended for self defence against light armoured ground targets.

Each gun has a firing rate of 550 rounds/min. The combined rate of fire is 1,100 rounds/min, which – in unlimited mode – gives a continuous fire time of 35 seconds before running out of ammunition (with 640 AA rounds for both guns). It is standard to fire bursts against air targets, 24 rounds per gun for a total of 48 in limited mode and 48 rounds per gun for a total of 96 in normal mode. The Ukrainian air defence have found that the guns "take an hour-and-a-half to reload", thus limiting their effectiveness.

The guns can be elevated to almost a 90-degree vertical angle.

=== Variants ===
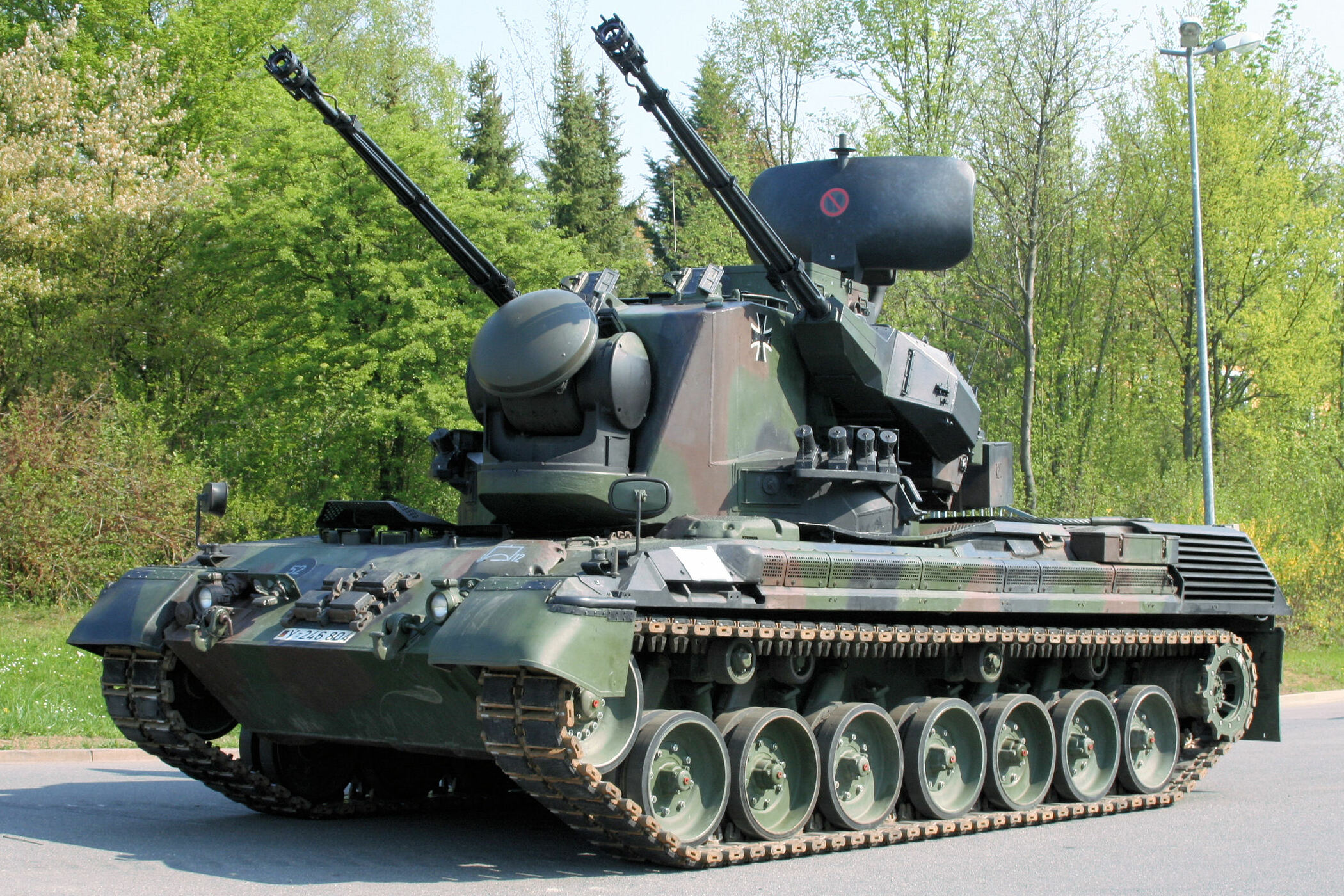
German Army Gepard 1A2

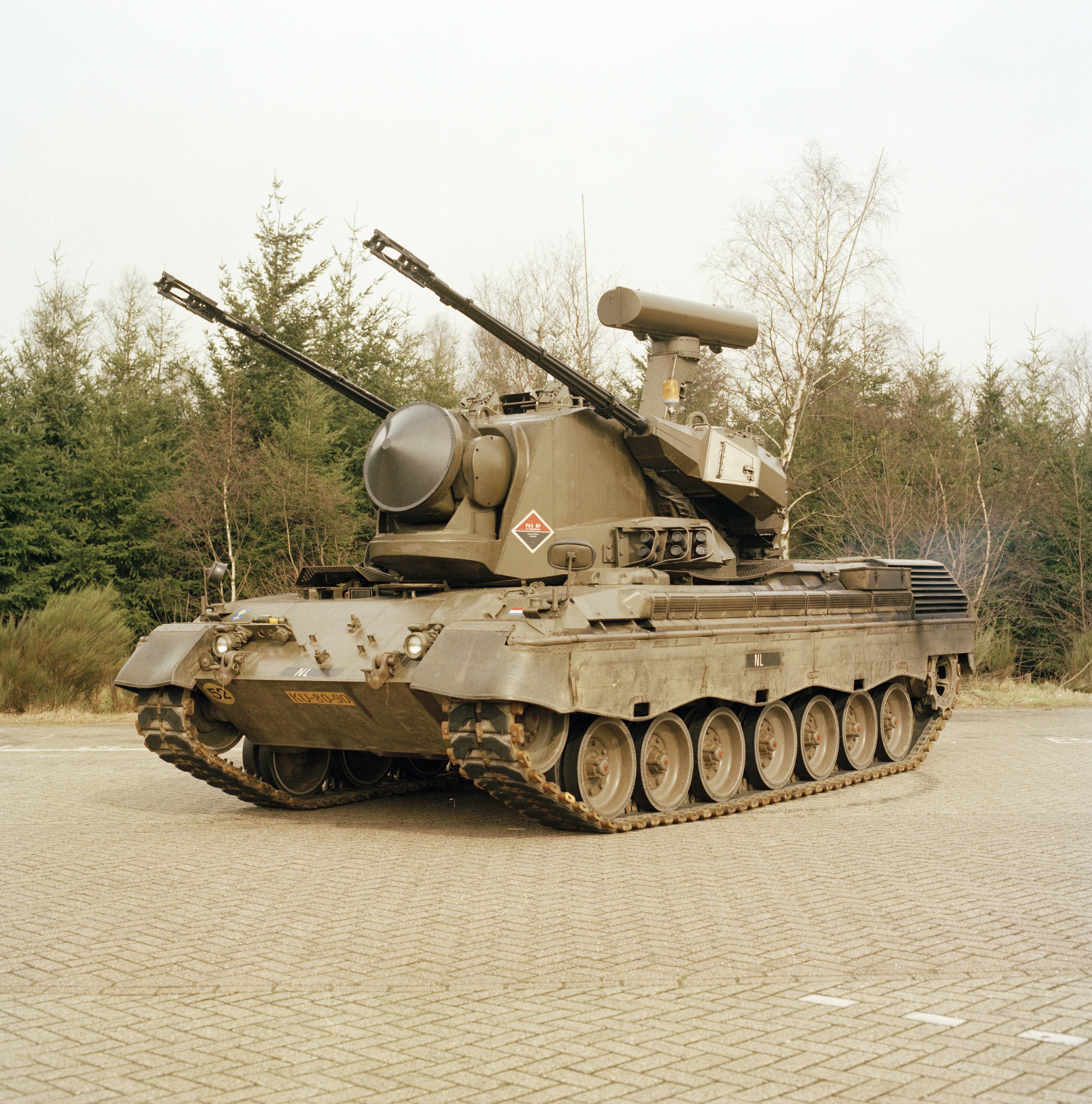
Dutch Army PRTL Cheetah

There are two main variants of Gepard; the German Gepard and the Dutch CA1, nicknamed the 'Cheetah'. The Dutch variant has a different radar installation.

Germany

Gepard 1

- Search radar: S band, 15 km range
- Tracking radar: K_{u} band, 15 km range

Gepard 1A1

- Improved version with a laser rangefinder

Gepard 1A2

- Upgraded version to fire the FAPDS-T round

Netherlands

CA1 'Cheetah'

- Search radar: X band, 15 km range
- Tracking radar: X/K_{a} band, 13 km range

== Operational history ==
=== Invasion of Ukraine ===
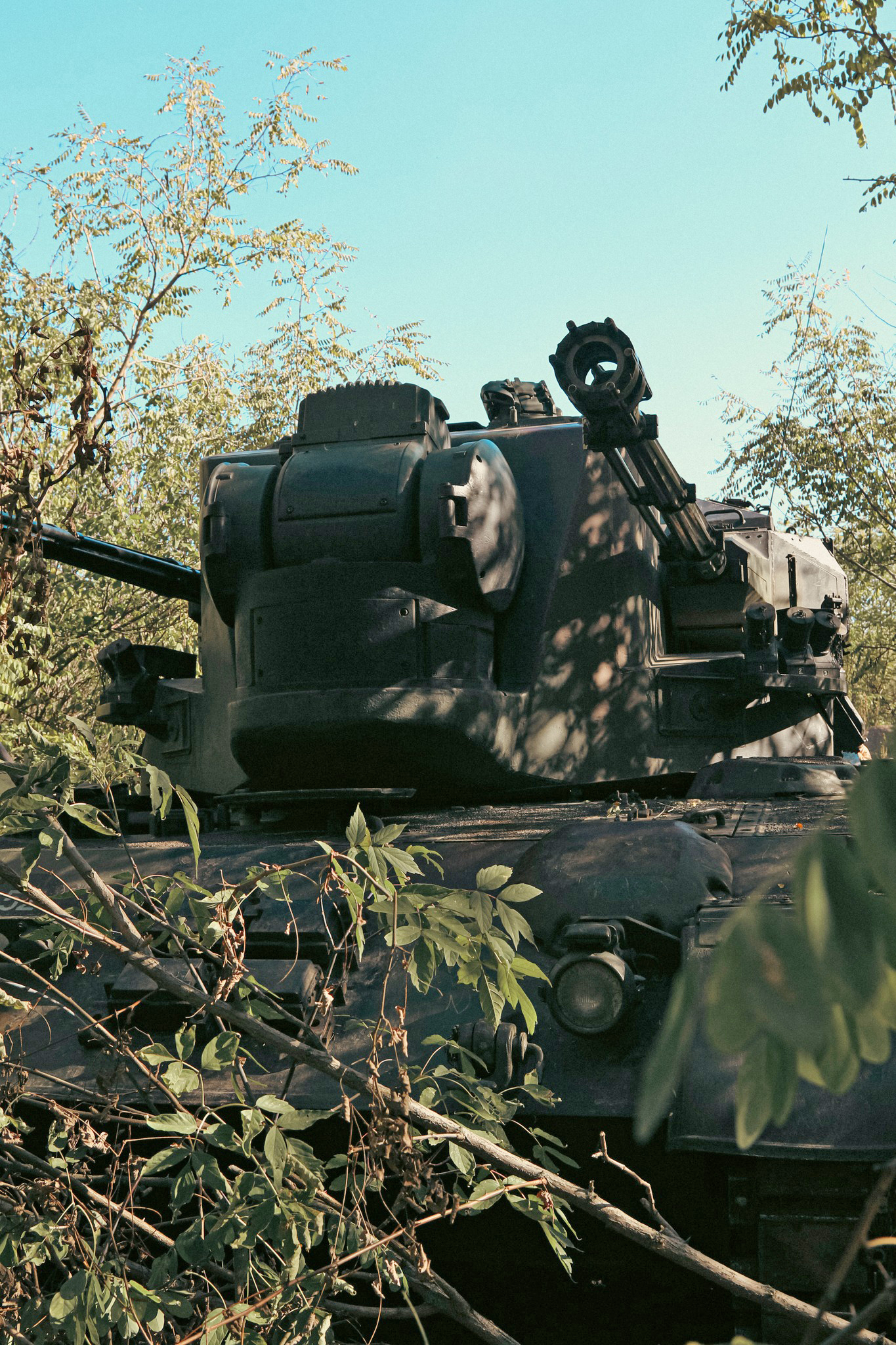
A Gepard in operation during the Russian invasion of Ukraine, 25 October 2022

The Gepard has been deployed by Ukraine in its defense against the Russian invasion of Ukraine. On 26 April 2022, the German government authorized Krauss-Maffei Wegmann to transfer around 50 refurbished Gepards to Ukraine, including in advance those vehicles that were sold to Brazil and Qatar as a security measure during mass sports events.

The first three Gepards arrived in Ukraine on 25 July 2022 and, by the end of September, thirty Gepards and 6,000 rounds had been delivered by Germany. On 2 December 2022, Germany recovered seven additional Gepard units from the scrapyard which they planned to refurbish and ship by spring but only 4 of them arrived to Ukraine as of 11 July 2023. In May 2023, 15 Gepards sold to Qatar in 2020 were purchased back by Germany for more than double the purchase price.

All 52 Gepards pledged by Germany were delivered to Ukraine by 22 December 2023. An additional 15 Gepards with 259,680 rounds of ammunition were pledged by Germany on 17 January 2024.

According to a Ukrainian defense attache in the United States, the Gepard has been used to "great effect" against the "relatively crude" loitering munition believed to be Iranian-made Shahed-136. The Conflict Intelligence Team considers it likely that a Gepard destroyed a Russian Kh-101 cruise missile as it was targeting a Kyiv power plant on 18 October 2022. One unit is credited with destroying more than ten Shahed-136 drones and two cruise missiles. A system such as the Gepard is more effective and hence more cost-effective than more advanced and expensive air defence systems such NASAMS or IRIS-T missiles, while being less politically sensitive as they only have a limited effective range. The London-based think tank, the Royal United Services Institute (RUSI) wrote: "In general, gun systems are preferred over missiles where possible due to the much lower cost per engagement and higher availability of ammunition compared with SAMs and MANPADS". Gepard was considered superior to the Russian Pantsir system's autocannon.

Ukraine allegedly suffered its first Gepard loss in April 2023 to a Lancet loitering munition, although the full video shows the Gepard relatively intact after the impact.

==== Delivery of ammunition ====
Obtaining ammunition was initially difficult as Switzerland – owing to its neutrality – forbade Germany and Denmark from transferring their stocks of Swiss-made rounds, and refused to supply its own surplus, forcing Germany to rely on other sources for ammunition.

A July 2022 delivery of ammunition manufactured in Norway was delayed as tests showed that they could not be fired by the Gepard. This issue was resolved by August and about 50,000 Norwegian-made rounds had been received by the end of September, according to Ukraine's Armed Forces. Photos from the German tabloid Bild of the Gepard with a Ukrainian crew include high-explosive incendiary (HEI) rounds (where the projectile is yellow with a red band) made by Nammo in Norway.

In December 2022, Rheinmetall committed to a new factory in Germany to sidestep the Swiss re-export ban. A deal to start production was signed in February 2023 and the first shipment of new ammunition was delivered to Ukraine in September 2023. Germany delivered the last three pledged Gepards to Ukraine by 22 December 2023 along with an additional 30,000 rounds of ammunition.

== Operators ==
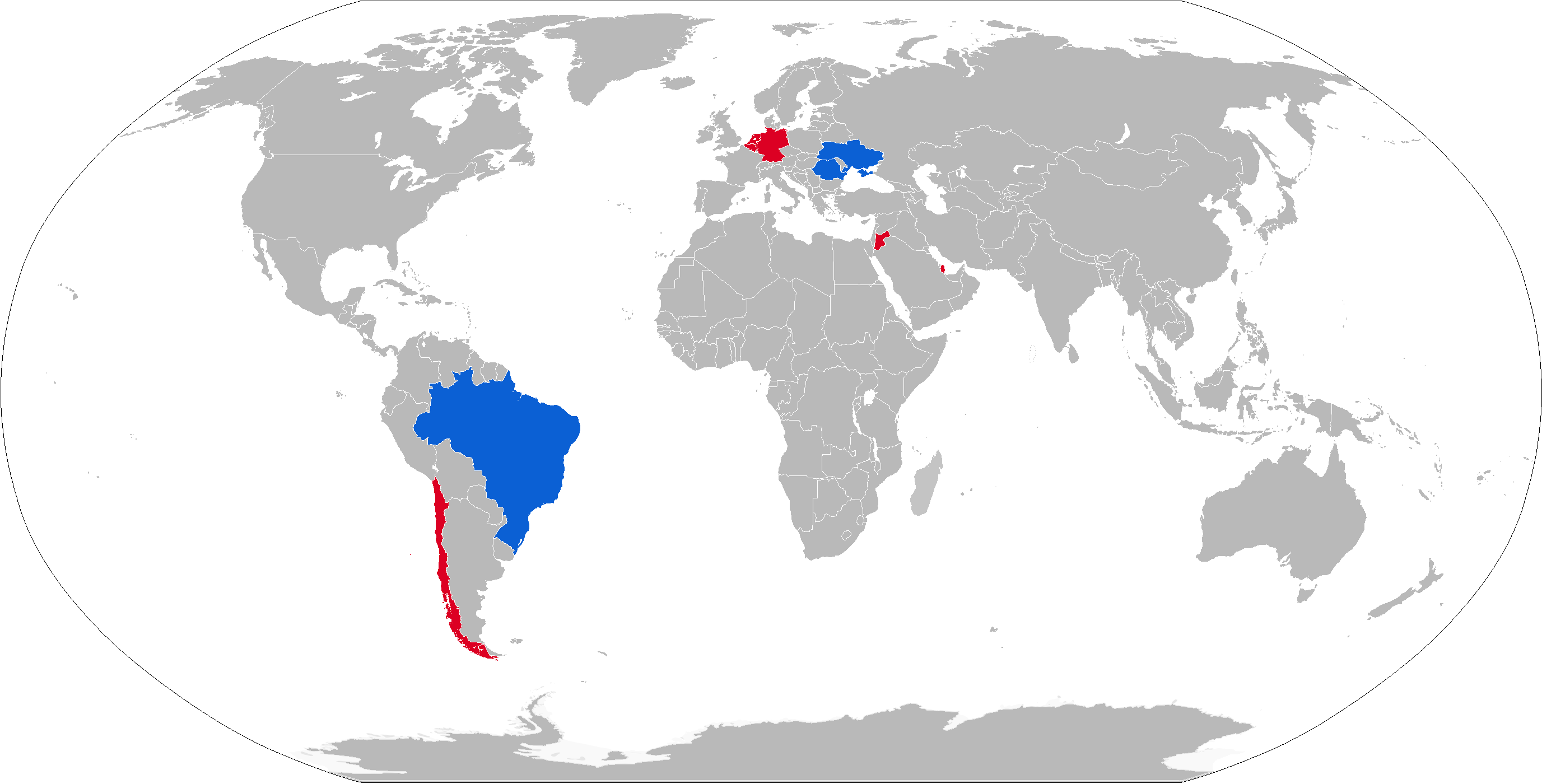
Flakpanzer Gepard operators Current Former

Romanian Gepards engage simulated targets at an exercise in Bemowo Piskie

=== Current ===
Brazil
34 Gepard 1A2 as of 2024

Romania
41 as of 2024 of which 7 used for spare parts as of 2017

Ukraine
55 in active service as of 2025; 130 delivered in 2022−2024

=== Former ===
Belgium
55 delivered, withdrawn from service around 2006, and sold to private companies.

Chile
30 vehicles were ordered, in 2008 and after testing 4 vehicles, they were withdrawn from service in 2011. According to KMW's regional director Stephan Straube, the vehicles were purchased from Belgian firm SABIEX (now OIP Land Systems) and were supposed to be upgraded by a joint effort of FAMAE and a private company, but it ultimately failed due to "a lack of proper knowledge about the system" (FAMAE didn't accept an offer from KMW of technical support), and costly logistical support.

Germany
420 originally built for the Bundeswehr (195 B2 and 225 B2L with additional laser rangefinder). During the 1980s, they equipped the anti-aircraft artillery regiments of the eleven German mechanized divisions with six batteries each and one additional corps level battalion with three batteries for a total of 69 batteries of six Gepard each. About 220 B2L were later modernised to Gepard 1A2 and equipped five active and the same number of reserve battalions of three batteries with seven Gepard each. This number was further reduced with the planned fielding of MANTIS and the change in military strategy to out-of-area missions. The last 94 of these remained in service until 2010 when they were gradually phased out until 2012 due to high maintenance costs. As of 27 May 2022 many of Germany's retired Gepards remain in outdoor storage with KMT's subsidiary Battle Tank Dismantling GmbH Koch in Rockensußra, Thuringia.

Jordan
60 were purchased from retired Dutch surplus for 21 million dollars. In May 2023, the Pentagon confirmed that an undisclosed number had been purchased by the U.S. for $118 million using funds from the Ukraine Security Assistance Initiative, with an expected delivery date of May 30, 2024. According to the German Defense Ministry, the U.S. plans to deliver up to 30 of these to Ukraine before the end of 2023. In November it was confirmed that the USA had bought all 60 of Jordan's Gepards for Ukraine as part of the $118 million deal, with the remaining 30 expected to be delivered by May 2024.

Netherlands
95 delivered, withdrawn from service and placed in storage as of 2006; 60 sold to Jordan in 2013.

Qatar
In December 2020, it was announced that a license had been issued for the export of a total of 15 Gepard anti-aircraft vehicles to Qatar. Furthermore, four automatic cannons, 30 barrels, 16,000 rounds of ammunition and 45 breechblocks will be delivered as spare parts. These were purchased in order to ensure air security for the 2022 FIFA World Cup. In early 2023, German government officials began negotiating with Qatar the possible purchase of their 15 Gepards to send these to Ukraine. In May 2023, it was reported that all 15 Gepards were repurchased by Germany for Ukraine, with Ukraine's ambassador for Germany later filmed in front of one of the ex-Qatari Gepards on a training site. Germany purchased the Gepards from Qatar for US$64 million, roughly double the price they were sold to Qatar for a few years earlier.

== Comparable systems ==
- CV9040 LvKv90 – (Sweden)
- Fliegerabwehrpanzer 68 – (Switzerland)
- Korkut – (Turkey)
- K30 Biho – (South Korea)
- M247 Sergeant York – (United States)
- Marksman anti-aircraft system – (United Kingdom)
- PGZ-95 – (China)
- PGZ-09 – (China)
- PZA Loara – (Poland)
- Slinger – (Australia)
- Type 87 self-propelled anti-aircraft gun – (Japan)
- ZSU-23-4 Shilka – (Soviet Union)

== Bibliography ==
- International Institute for Strategic Studies (2010). The Military Balance. Routledge. ISBN 978-1-85743-557-3.
- International Institute for Strategic Studies (2024). The Military Balance 2024. Taylor & Francis. ISBN 978-1-040-05115-3.
- International Institute for Strategic Studies (11 February 2025). "Chapter Four: Russia and Eurasia". The Military Balance. 125 (1). Taylor & Francis: 152–205. doi:10.1080/04597222.2025.2445476. ISSN 0459-7222.
