= Islamic Republic of Iran Air Defense Force =

Anti-aircraft and aerial defense service branch of the Islamic Republic of Iran Army

- نیروی پدافند هوایی ارتش جمهوری اسلامی ایران
- Seal of the Islamic Republic of Iran Air Defense Force
- Founded: 1933–1954 (Part of Ground Forces); 1954–2008 (Part of Air Force); 2008–present (As separate branch)
- Country: Iran
- Type: Air defence
- Size: 15,000
- Part of: Artesh
- Headquarters: Tehran
- Mottos: Arabic: وَمَا رَمَيْتَ إِذْ رَمَيْتَ وَلَـكِنَّ اللّهَ رَمَى "And You Did Not Throw When You Threw, But God Did Throw" ^{[Quran 8:17]}
- March: April 18th
- Anniversaries: September 1st
- Engagements: World War II; Anglo-Soviet invasion; Second Iraqi–Kurdish War; 1974–1975 Shatt al-Arab conflict; Iran–Iraq War; 2011 Iran RQ-170 capture; 2019–2021 Persian Gulf crisis; 2019 Iranian shoot-down of American drone; 2024 Iran–Israel conflict; Twelve-Day War; 2026 Iran war

Commanders
- Commander: Brigadier General Alireza Elhami

Insignia
- Official flag

The Islamic Republic of Iran Air Defense Force (Persian: نیروی پدافند هوایی ارتش جمهوری اسلامی ایران, romanized: Niruye Pədâfənde Həvâyiye Ərteše Jomhuriye Eslâmiye Irân) is the anti-aircraft warfare branch of Iran's regular military, the Islamic Republic of Iran Army (Artesh). It split from the Air Force in 2008 and controls the country's military radar network.

The Islamic Republic of Iran Air Defense Force plays a crucial role in the nation's military framework, tasked with safeguarding Iran's airspace and essential infrastructure from aerial threats. the IRIADF utilizes various air defense systems and technologies, such as surface-to-air missiles, anti-aircraft artillery, and radar systems. The main objective of the Iranian Air Defense Force is to detect, identify, and neutralize hostile aircraft, drones, and missiles operating within the airspace of Iran.

== History ==
In the late 1950s the (then) Imperial (Shah) Iranian Air Force was an important US allied force and a buffer to counter any possible Soviet attack in the unstable middle east region. Radar coverage of the Iranian airspace however was very poor in those days because of a lack of standardization, various former WW2 British and US radar equipment had been used, and because of the rough countryside.

US research learned that automation of the Iranian air defense conceptually consisted of: 2 hardened command posts (a primary one and its backup) buried in the northern and southern Iran mountains, and a radar network spread out over the country. Raw radar data from nationwide sites would have to be digitally converted and transferred via a national microwave telecommunication system to mainframe computers at the command posts, where the information would have been converted into realtime data and further used in the command and control cycles.

In support of the (then) Imperial (Shah) Iranian Air Force the US funded an Iranian radar network and from 1962 to 1977 the USAF Communication Service (AFCS) constructed 19 radar facilities spread out over the country covering almost 70% of the Iranian airspace. In the northern part of Iran this was called the Spellout network and in the southern part the Peace Ruby network. A combined troposcatter communication link (Peace Net) connected both Spellout and Peace Ruby radar systems. The original radar sites are still standing; their technical and operational status after 40+ years however is unknown.

Starting in 2002 Iran modernized its air defenses with new air surveillance radars, replacing the outdated US systems, SAM's and Command, Control, Communications, Computers, Intelligence, Surveillance and Reconnaissance (C4ISR) systems Iran purchased multiple Russian Rezonas-N over the horizon backscatter radars of the Sepher (Sky) and the Ghadir (Almighty) systems. Together with the mobile deployable Falaq, an Iranian version of the Russian 67N6E Gamma D radar the entire Iranian airspace has been covered

As of 1996, Iranian Air Defense forces included about 18,000 military personnel. The tradition of aircraft-based air defense, derived from the US-trained Air Force from before the 1979 Iranian revolution, was giving way to an expanding arsenal of ground-based air defense missile systems. Still, Iran was at the time unable to construct a nationwide, integrated air defense network, and continued to rely on point defense of key locations with surface-to-air missile batteries.

The bulk of Iran's Air Force Air Defense holdings by the mid-1990s revolved around 30 Improved HAWK fire units (12 battalions/150+ launchers), 45-60 SA-2 and HQ-2J/23 (CSA-1 Chinese equivalents of the SA-2) launchers. Also available were some 30 Rapier and 15 Tigercat SAM launchers. There are reports of the transfer of SA-6 launchers to Iran from Russia in 1995/1996. In 1997, the Iranian Air Defense forces declared the Almaz S-200 Angara (SA-5 'Gammon') low-to high-altitude surface-to-air missile (SAM) operational.

In December 2005, Iran entered into a contract to purchase 29 TOR-M1 (SA-15 Gauntlet) mobile surface-to-air missile defense systems from Russia worth more than US$700 million (EUR 600 million). Between 1998 and 2002, Iran imported approximately 6 JY-14 surveillance radars from the China National Electronics Import-Export Corporation. The radar can detect targets up to 300 km away and is now part of Iran's air defense system.

On 1 September 2008, it was reported that Russia may proceed with plans to sell advanced S-300 air defense systems to Iran under a secret contract believed to have been signed in 2005. On 22 September 2010, Russian President Dmitry Medvedev signed a decree banning the sale of the S-300 and other military equipment to Iran. The sale was canceled because of United Nations Security Council Resolution 1929 sanctions on Iran. On 10 November 2010, Iran announced that it had developed a version of the S-300 missile. By the end of 2016 Russia had lifted the self-imposed ban on the sale and completed delivery of all missiles to Iran.

Iranian land forces have a total of some 1,700 anti-aircraft guns including 14.5mm ZPU-2/-4, 23mm ZSU-23-4, 23mm ZU-23s, 37mm Type 55s, 57mm ZSU-57-2 and 100mm KS-19s. Iran also had 100-180 Bofors L/70 40mm guns and modest numbers of Skyguard 35mm twin anti-aircraft guns. Its largest holding consisted of ZU-23s(which it can manufacture).

Recently Iran has built several new anti-aircraft guns including Samavat 35mm Anti-Aircraft Guns, Sa'ir 100mm Anti-Aircraft Guns (Upgraded automatic version of KS-19) and the Mesbah 1 air defense system.

On 21 August 2012, the Iranian military started construction of its largest air defense base in the city of Abadeh in the Southern Fars province. The air defense base is due to be built at the cost of $300 million and will have 6,000 personnel available for a large array of duties, including educational ones. Days later, the defense ministry also announced plans to develop Bavar 373, a new long-range air-defense system, by March 21, 2013.

== Equipment ==
=== Radar systems ===
- Nazir Over-the-Horizon Radar
- Sepehr
- Alim
- Falaq
- Asr
- Arash
- Ghamar
- Matla-ul-fajr
- Qadir
- Kashef

=== Gun based air-defense systems ===
- ZU-23-2
- Oerlikon GDF
- 100 mm air defense gun KS-19
- Mesbah 1
- ZSU-23-4 Shilka
- ZSU-57-2

=== Man-portable air-defense systems ===
- Misagh-1
- Misagh-2
- Misagh-3
- Qaem
- Kamin-2
- HN-5
- RBS-70

=== Air-defense missile systems ===
- Arman (missile system)
- Azarakhsh (defense system)
- Zoubin (defense system)
- MIM-23 Hawk
- Rapier
- 2K12 Kub
- Sayyad-2
- Herz-9
- Mersad
- AD-08 Majid
- Mehran
- HQ-2J
- HQ-7
- Shalamcheh
- Shahin
- Ya Zahra
- Ra'd
- Khordad 15
- Khordad 3
- Tabas
- 358
- 359
- Bavar-373
- 9 Dey
- Talaash
- Tor
- Pantsir
- S-75
- S-300
- SA-8
- SA-13
- SA-11/17

== Commanders ==
No.	Picture	Name	Took office	Left office	Time in office
1	Ahmad Meyghani	Brigadier General; Ahmad Meyghani (born 1957)	31 August 2008	16 January 2011	2 years, 138 days
2	Farzad Esmaili	Brigadier General; Farzad Esmaili (born 1972)	16 January 2011	29 May 2018	7 years, 133 days
3	Alireza Sabahifard	Brigadier General; Alireza Sabahifard (born 1963)	29 May 2018	15 December 2025	7 years, 200 days
4	Alireza Elhami	Brigadier General; Alireza Elhami	15 December 2025	Incumbent	260 days

== Ranks ==
=== Commissioned officer ranks ===
The rank insignia of commissioned officers.

Rank group	General / flag officers					Senior officers			Junior officers
Iranian Air Defense Force
Iranian Air Defense Force	ارتشبد; Arteshbod	سپهبد; Sepahbod	سرلشکر; Sarlashkar	سرتیپ; Sartip	سرتیپ دوم; Sartip dovom	سرهنگ; Sarhang	سرهنگ دوم; Sarhang dovom	سرگرد; Sargord	سروان; Sarvān	ستوان یکم; Sotvān yekom	ستوان دوم; Sotvān dovom	ستوان سوم; Sotvān sevom

=== Other ranks ===
The rank insignia of non-commissioned officers and enlisted personnel.

Rank group	Senior NCOs					Junior NCOs		Enlisted
Iranian Air Defense Force
Iranian Air Defense Force	استوار یکم; Ostovar yekom	استوار دوم; Ostovar dovom	گروهبان یکم; Goruhban yekom	گروهبان دوم; Goruhban dovom	گروهبان سوم; Goruhban sevom	سرجوخه; Sarjukheh	سرباز یکم; Sarbaz yekom	سرباز دوم; Sarbaz dovom	سرباز; Sarbaz
