= List of equipment of the Islamic Republic of Iran Air Defense Force =

This is a list of equipment of the Islamic Republic of Iran Air Defense Force.

== Air defense missile systems ==
| Model | Image | Type | Quantity | Years | Notes |
Long-range
| Arman | | Mobile long-range surface-to-air/anti-ballistic missile system | N/A | 2024–present | In February 2024, Iran unveiled the new locally made Arman long range anti-ballistic missile system. It has the ability to cover 360 degrees and engage simultaneously with 6 different targets, with a maximum target detection of up to 24 targets at a time. It can refill its missiles in less than 3 minutes. Specification: Range: 180 km Speed: Mach 5–6.5 |
| Bavar-373 | | Advanced long range surface-to-air missile system | 2+ battery | 2019–present | An Iranian long range air defence system whose development began after the Russian refusal to supply the S-300, from 2010 to 2015. Specification: Range: 230 km (initial version), 300 km (upgraded version); Altitude: Up to 30 km |
| Talaash | | Long range surface-to-air missile system | 41-42 batteries | 2017-present | This system utilizes both the Sayyad-2 and Sayyad-3 missiles. Specification: Range: 200 km Altitude: Up to 30 km |
| S-300PMU2 System | | Long range strategic surface-to-air missile system | | 2016–present | Iran possess the latest S-300 version S-300PMU2. Obtained 4 batteries from Russia. Iran states that it has a "domestically made" system with the same capabilities as the S-300. In 2016, Russia completed the delivery of all missiles to Iran. All of these systems were destroyed in 2024. S-300PMU2 systems missile specification: Missile type: 48N6E2 missile Range: 200 km Altitude: Up to 27 km Speed: Mach 6–8.5 and Mach 9+ speed used for counter ballistic missile Warhead: 180 kg |
| Sayyad missiles | | Long range surface-to-air missiles | | | Multiple variants exist, including the Sayyad-1, Sayyad-2, and Sayyad-3. Sayyad-1: The Sayyad-1 anti aircraft missile is an upgraded copy of the Chinese HQ-2. The Sayyad-1 has IR tracking. In 2010, Iran upgraded all of their Sayyad-1 anti aircraft missiles into Sayyad-1A anti aircraft missiles. This increased the Sayyad-1 missile range to 80–100 km, from the previous 60 km range. Missile specification: Range: 80–100 km Altitude: 27 km Speed: Mach 3.6; Warhead: 195 kg Sayyad-2: Mass production began in November 2013. Missile specification: Range: 100–120 km Altitude: 27 km Speed: Mach 3.6–4; Warhead: 200 kg Sayyad-3: The Sayyad-3 is an upgrade to the Sayyad-2 Missile. It has a similar diameter as the Sayyad-2 but a longer body with different wings and control surfaces. Mass production began in July 2017. Missile specification: Range: 120–150 km Altitude: 27–30 km Speed: Mach 4.5–5.1; Warhead: Unknown |
| Khordad 15 | Khordad-15 system | Long range advanced surface-to-air missile system | 42+ battery | 2013–present | The Khordad 15 is claimed to be able to destroy six targets at once. The system is capable of detecting fighter aircraft, cruise missile and unmanned combat aerial vehicles (UCAV) from 150 kilometres (93 mi) away and is able to track them within a range of 120 kilometres (75 mi). The Sayyad-3 missile, used by the SAM system, has a range of 200 kilometres (120 mi). The system can detect stealth targets from a distance of 85 kilometres (53 mi) and can intercept and destroy them from a range of 45 kilometres (28 mi). Missile system specification: Detection Range: 150 km Operational Range: 500 km |
| S-200 Fajr-8 and S-200 Ghareh | | Long range strategic surface-to-air missile | 10 battery | 2011–present | In 2007, Iran upgraded all of their old S-200 missiles to the S-200 Fajr-8. Its range increased to 200–250 km. An Iranian home made version of the S-200 missile is the S-200 Ghareh, with a range of 250–350 km. The S-200 Ghareh missile uses the Talash-3 system and the Bavar-373 system. The S-200 Ghareh missiles speed is Mach 6. Its maximum flight altitude is 40 km, equipped with 200 kg high explosive warhead. |
Medium-range
| AD-40 | | Medium-range, surface-to-air missile defense system. | N/A | 2024-present | Was designed to intercept tactical and strategic aerial threats, including aircraft, unmanned aerial vehicles, and helicopters. |
| Raad-1,2 and Khordad-3 | | Medium range advanced air defense system | | 2012–present | 1. Raad-1 anti aircraft missile system. A Taer-1 missile and a 1ST Khordad TEL vehicle.; 2. Radd-2 anti aircraft missile system. A Taer-2 missile and a Tabas truck launcher vehicle. Also known as the 2ND Khordad TEL.; 3. 3RD Khordad TEL system equipped with opt-electronic system and Taer-2 missile and Sayyad-2C missile. Also known as the Khordad-3 missile system.; Taer-1 missile specification: Range: 50 km Altitude: 25–27 km Speed: Mach 3.6; Warhead: 40–50 kg Taer-2 missile specification: Range: 60 km Altitude: 30 km Speed: Mach 4 Warhead: 40–50 kg Sayyad-2C missile specification: Range: 75 km Altitude: 30 km Speed: Mach 4.5+ Warhead: 200 kg |
| 2K12 Kub | | Medium range surface-to-air missile system | 50 battery | 1995–present | Reports of eight 2K12 (NATO designation SA-6) systems transferred to Iran from Russia in 1995/1996. A Russian Kub-M1 missile system upgraded with an Iranian Raad-1 anti aircraft missile system. Missile specification: Range: 30 km Altitude: 16 km Speed: Mach 2.8; Warhead: 59 kg |
| Kamin-2 | | Low altitude medium range air defense system | + | 2018–present | The Kamin-2 system is the upgraded version of a missile known as Mersad. Its range is 60 km. The Kamin-2 missile is specially designed for low flying objects, targeting cruise missiles, helicopters, aircraft and drones at low altitude. |
| Mersad | | Medium range air defense system | 300+ battery | 2010–present | In 2010, Iran announced that it will be mass-producing its next generation of air defense system called Mersad, which based on the advanced medium altitude Salamche missile and next year Shahin missile.Both are localised variants of the MIM-23 Hawk. Missile specification: Range: Salamche 40 km and Shahain 45 km Altitude: Up to 20 km Speed: Mach 3 |
| MIM-23 Hawk | | Medium range surface-to-air missile | 200 battery | 1970s–present | In 1999, Iran locally upgraded their Hawk missile systems to Improved Hawk missiles and increased their range to 24–30 km and flight altitude to 14–16 km. Missile specifications: Range: 24–30 km Altitude: 14–16 km Speed: Mach 2.4; Warhead: Likely 74 kg based on pre-existing Hawk systems |
Short-range
| Zoubin | | Short range air defense system | N/A | 2022-present | |
| Azarakhsh | | Low-altitude portable air defense system | N/A | 2024-present | The new system is engineered for rapid deployment and offers comprehensive 360-degree coverage by integrating radar and electro-optical tracking systems. It began production in February 2024. Specifications: Length: 6.5 meters Range: 10 km Altitude: 6.5 km Speed: Mach 1.8; Warhead: 9kg |
| Tor | | Point defense multirole surface-to-air missile | 29 launchers | 2005–present | Specifications: Length: 2.9 meters Range: 16 km Altitude: 6 km Speed: Mach 2.8; Warhead: 16 kg |
| Herz-9 | | Close-in weapon air defense system | 200+ launchers | 2013–present | The Herz-9 is 3.5+ generation version of Ya Zahra system. The Herz-9 was developed for very low altitude operations. Its missile is claimed to be more effective than the previous design. Mass production of the Herz-3 began in May 2013 Specifications: Length: 2.9 meters Range: 10 km Altitude: 5—5,000 meters Speed: Mach 2.7-2.9; Warhead: 14 kg. |
| Ya Zahra-3 | | Low altitude air defense system | 200+ launchers | 2013–present | The Ya Zahra-3 is an improved and 3rd generation of the Ya Zahra missile defense system. The new system has optoelectronics equipment that help to detect and track targets in the air when the battlefield is affected by heavy jamming. Mass production of the Ya Zahra-3 system began in January 2013. Specifications: Length: Unknown; Range: 16 km Altitude: 6.5 km Speed: Mach 2.8; Warhead: 14 kg |
| Rapier | | Short range surface-to-air missile | 30 launchers | 1971–present | 45 towed systems with Blindfire radar delivered before 1979. 72 self-propelled systems and local production of 1,000 missiles was cancelled in 1979. Beginning in 2008, Iran locally upgraded all of Rapier missile systems. Specifications: Length: 2.23 meters Range: 10 km Altitude: Approximately 5,000 meters Speed: Mach 2.5; Warhead: 14 kg |
| Qaem-118 | | Short-Range air defence system | N/A | 2025–present | Specifications: Range: 25 km |
| 9-DEY | | Short-Range air defence system | N/A | 2025–present | Specifications: Range: 30 km Altitude: 20 km |
| Majid | | Short-Range air defence system | N/A | 2021–present | Specifications: Range: 8 km Altitude: 6 km Speed: Mach 2 |
| Jaljaleh | | Air defence mine | N/A | 2025-present | Specifications: Altitude: 35 meters |
| 358 missile | | Short-Range anti aircraft loitering munition | N/A | 2019?-present | Specifications: |
| 359 missile | | | | | |

== Man-portable air-defense systems ==
| Model | Image | Type | Quantity |
|---|---|---|---|
| Misagh-1 | | Man-portable air-defense system | +++ |
| Misagh-2 | | Man-portable air-defense system | ++++ |
| Misagh-3 | | Man-portable air-defense system | +++ |
| 9K333 Verba | | Man-portable air-defense system | 500 Verba launchers and 2,500 9M336 missiles |
| Soheil | | Quadruple man-portable air-defense system | +++ |
| Qaem | | Anti-helicopter missile system | + |

== Air defense artillery systems ==
| Model | Type | Quantity | Notes |
|---|---|---|---|
| ZSU-23-4 Shilka | Self-propelled anti-aircraft weapon | ++ | |
| ZSU-57-2 | Self-propelled anti-aircraft weapon | +++ | A domestic "Bahman" mounted on a 6x6 truck chassis. |
| ZU-23-2 | 23 mm anti-air twin-barreled autocannon | ++++ | A self-propelled version mounted on a Safir Jeep. |
| Mesbah 1 | Close-in weapon system | +++ | |
| Sa'ir | 100 mm anti-air gun | +++ | Iranian KS-19. An Iranian made optoelectronics-guided 100mm anti-aircraft gun. It can detect and intercept targets automatically at long and medium-range altitude. Specifications: Range: 21 km Altitude: up to 16 km Rate of fire: 26 rounds per minute |
| Samavat | 35 mm anti-air autocannon | ++++ | Iranian Oerlikon GDF. Optoelectronics radar-guided. |

== See also ==
- List of aircraft of the Iranian Air Force
- List of aircraft of the Islamic Revolutionary Guard Corps Aerospace Force
