= Falaq (radar) =

Iranian surveillance radar system

Falaq فلق
- Country of origin: Iran
- Introduced: August 10, 2019
- Type: 3D phased array radar system
- Related: 67N6E

The Falaq (Persian:فلق) is an Iranian air surveillance radar system. It is a domestically upgraded and refurbished version of the Russian-made 67N6E Gamma-DE air surveillance radar. It is a 3D phased-array radar system. The system is capable of identifying all types of cruise missiles, stealth planes, unmanned aerial vehicles and ballistic missiles within a range of 400 kilometers.

The system was unveiled in Tehran on 10 August 2019, in an announcement made by the commander of Iran's Air Defense Force Brigadier General Alireza Sabahifard. Brigadier General Alireza Sabahifard stated in the announcement that the system was developed in order to counter US economic sanctions restricting Iranian access to spare parts of a previously foreign-developed system. This prompted Iranian engineers to "reconstruct" the system in a process that took 2,300 man-hours. The unveiling of the radar system came at a time of escalating tensions between Iran and United States and Europe's failing attempts at upholding its commitments to the 2015 Iran nuclear deal.

== Name ==
The Falaq radar system is named after the 113th chapter (sūrah) of the Qur'an. It is a brief five verse invocation, asking God (Allah) for protection and refuge from the evil of Satan.

This surah and the 114th (and last) surah in the Qur'an, an-Nās, are collectively referred to as al-Mu'awwidhatayn (Arabic for "the Refuges"), as both begin with "I seek refuge". An-Nās tells to seek God's refuge from the evil within, while al-Falaq tells to seek God's refuge from the evil from outside. Essentially, reading both of them is said to protect a person from his own mischief and the mischief of others.
