= Arash (radar) =

Iranian military radar

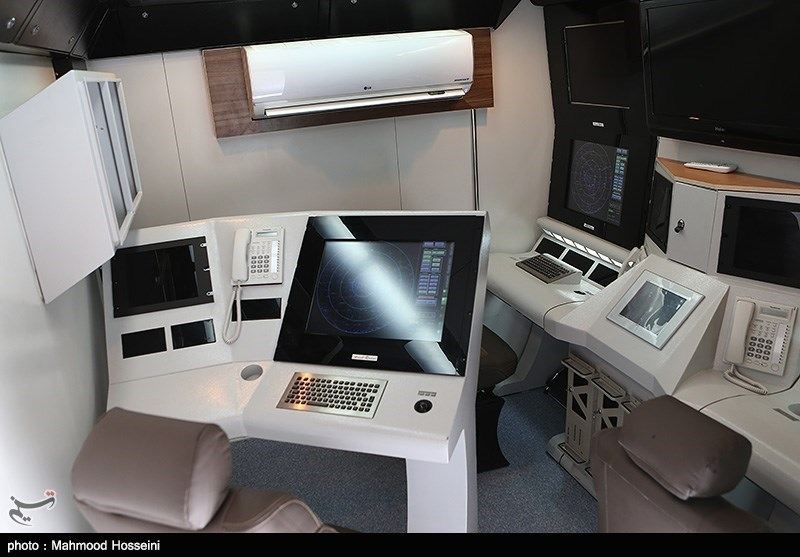
Interior of the control unit of Arash-2 radar

Arash (Persian: رادار آرش) is a long-range radar system built by the Islamic Republic of Iran Air Defense Force. According to Brigadier General Farzad Esmaili, commander of the Islamic Republic of Iran Air Defense Force, Arash radar Phased array radar is complete. He also said in an interview:«The radar will be developed in the foreseeable future, Radar with very high capacity to detect and identify targets and Also in the field of electronic warfare is approved by the Ayatollah Ali Khamenei.

== See also ==
- Arash the Archer
