= USS Forrest Sherman (DDG-98) =

Arleigh Burke-class destroyer

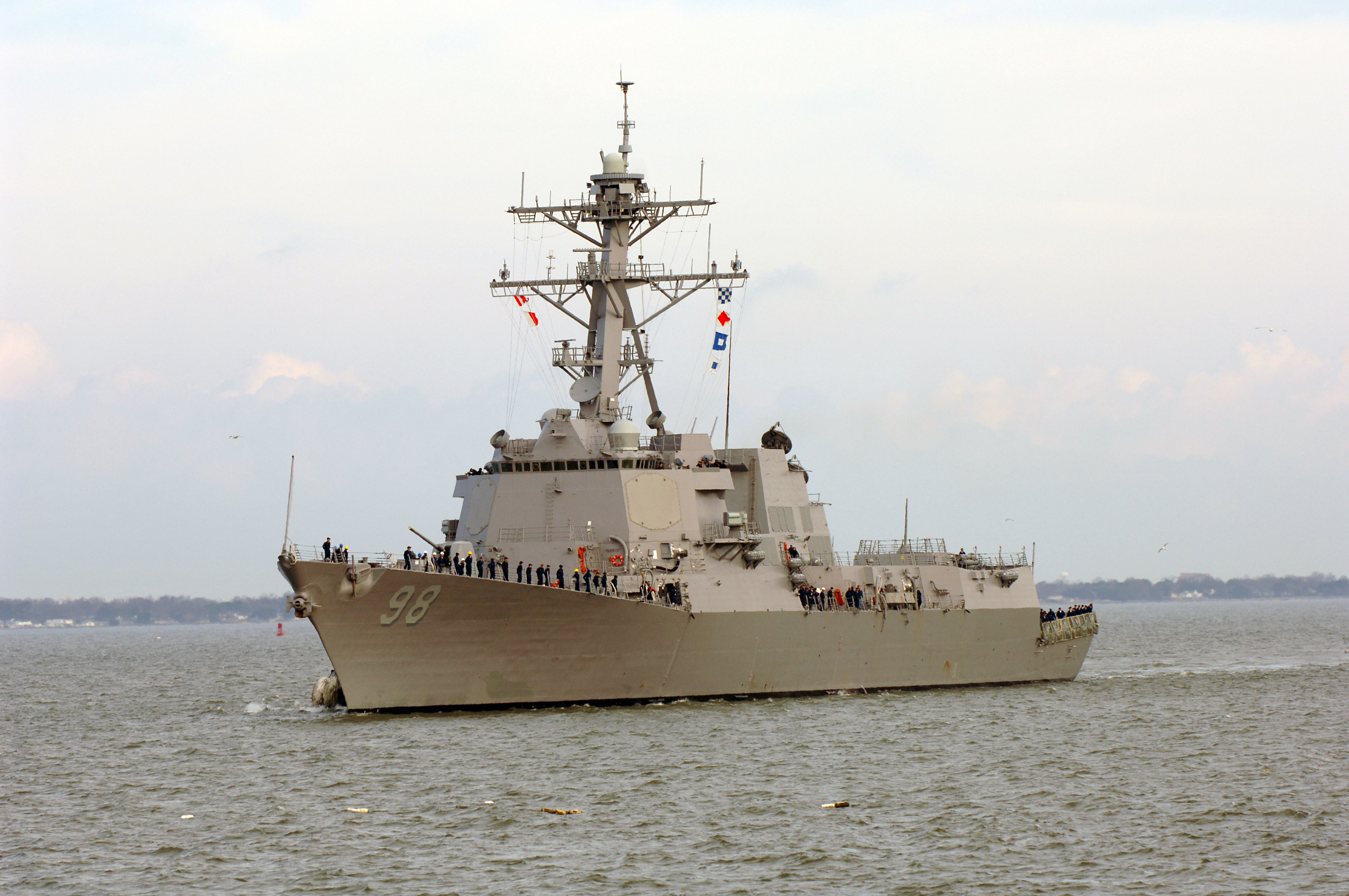
- USS Forrest Sherman on 3 February 2006

History

United States
- Name: Forrest Sherman
- Namesake: Forrest Sherman
- Ordered: 6 March 1998
- Builder: Ingalls Shipbuilding, Mississippi
- Laid down: 7 August 2003
- Launched: 2 October 2004
- Sponsored by: Ann Sherman Fitzpatrick
- Commissioned: 28 January 2006
- Home port: Norfolk
- Identification: MMSI number: 369980000; Callsign: NFPS; Pennant number: DDG-98
- Motto: Relentless Fighting Spirit
- Status: in active service
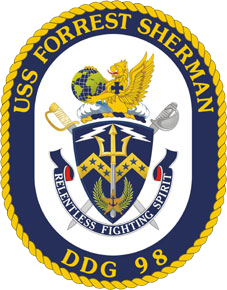
- Badge

General characteristics
- Class & type: Arleigh Burke-class destroyer
- Displacement: 9,200 tons
- Length: 509 ft 6 in (155.30 m)
- Beam: 66 ft (20 m)
- Draft: 31 ft (9.4 m)
- Propulsion: 4 × General Electric LM2500-30 gas turbines; 2 shafts; 100,000 shp (75,000 kW)
- Speed: 30+ knots (55+ km/h)
- Complement: 380 officers and enlisted
- Armament: Guns: 1 × 5-inch (127 mm)/62 Mk 45 Mod 4 (lightweight gun); 1 × 20 mm (0.8 in) Phalanx CIWS; 2 × 25 mm (0.98 in) Mk 38 machine gun system; 4 × 0.50 in (12.7 mm) caliber guns; Missiles: 1 × 32-cell, 1 × 64-cell (96 total cells) Mk 41 vertical launching system (VLS): RIM-66M surface-to-air missile; RIM-156 surface-to-air missile; RIM-174A Standard ERAM; RIM-161 anti-ballistic missile; RIM-162 ESSM (quad-packed); BGM-109 Tomahawk cruise missile; RUM-139 vertical launch ASROC; Torpedoes: 2 × Mark 32 triple torpedo tubes: Mark 46 lightweight torpedo; Mark 50 lightweight torpedo; Mark 54 lightweight torpedo
- Aircraft carried: 2 × MH-60R Seahawk helicopters

USS Forrest Sherman (DDG-98) is an Arleigh Burke-class (Flight IIA) Aegis guided missile destroyer in the United States Navy and is the second US Navy ship to bear the name. She is part of Destroyer Squadron 2.

== Namesake ==
She is named for Admiral Forrest Percival Sherman.

== Construction ==
Built by Northrop Grumman Ship Systems Ingalls Shipbuilding in Pascagoula, Mississippi, Forrest Sherman was launched on 2 October 2004. Admiral Sherman's daughter, Ann Sherman Fitzpatrick, is the ship's sponsor.

== History ==
The destroyer was commissioned on 28 January 2006 at Naval Air Station Pensacola, Commander Michael VanDurick in command, and six days later departed for her homeport at Naval Station Norfolk, Virginia to join the Atlantic Fleet.

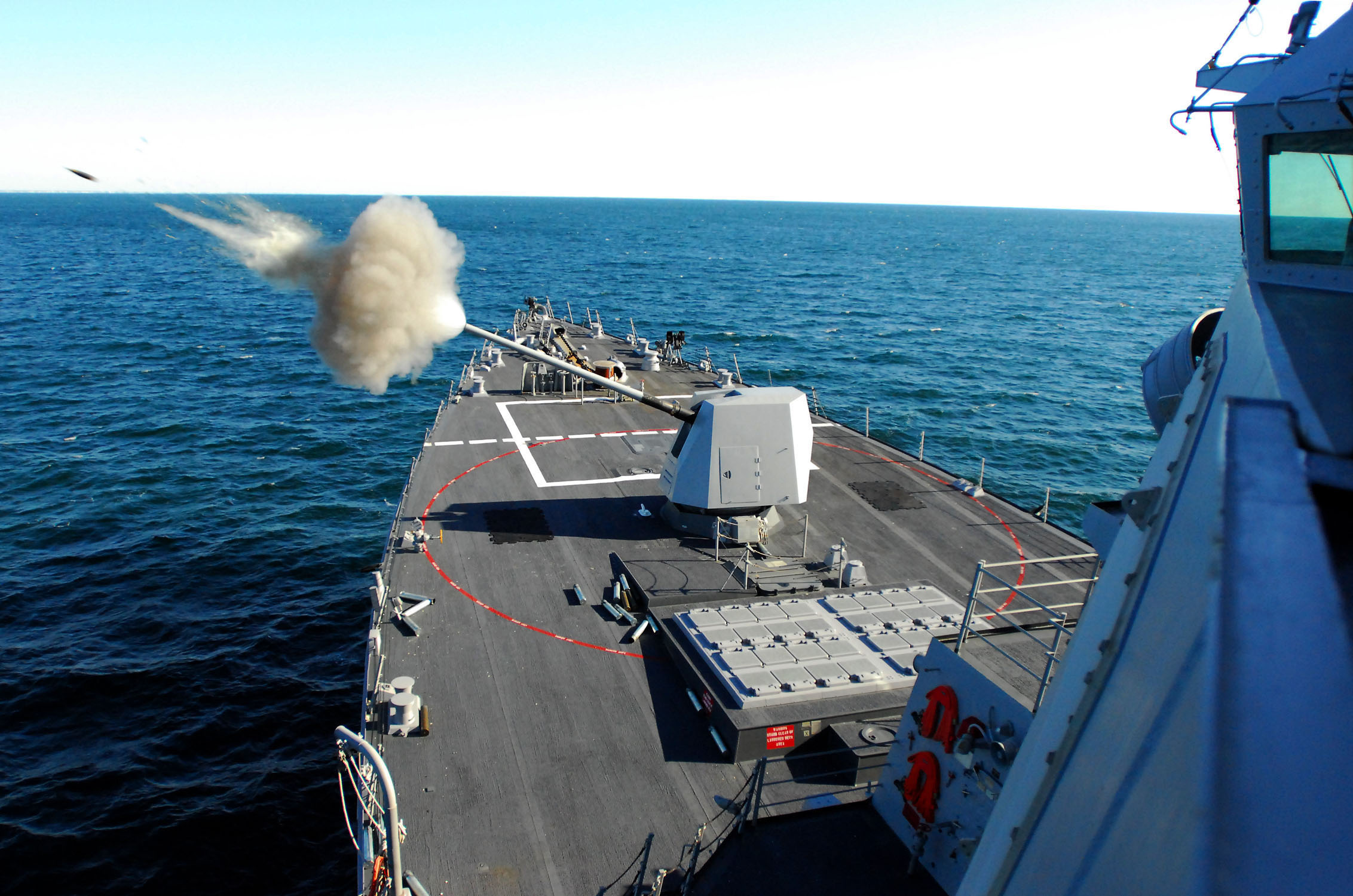
Forrest Sherman in 2007, test firing her new 5-inch/62-caliber Mark 45 Mod 4 gun, located forward of her 32-cell missile pack module

She departed Norfolk for her maiden deployment in July 2007, visiting various nations around the Mediterranean Sea and the Black Sea. In August 2007, while the ship was visiting Sevastopol to conduct drills with the Ukrainian Navy, a 1,100-pound (500 kg) naval mine from the Second World War was discovered 500 yards (460 m) from the vessel. The mine was secured before it could damage the ship. Also during that visit, she became the first US Navy ship to land a Ukrainian Navy helicopter. She also conducted the military exercise "Reliant Mermaid 2007" with the Turkish and Israeli navies. On that deployment, she circumnavigated the continent of Africa as part of Task Group 60.5, the US Navy's Southeast Africa task force. She returned home on 19 December that year.

In early June 2008, Forrest Sherman deployed for three months in support of U.S. Southern Command's Partnership of the Americas 2008 (POA 08) operation. She returned home on 29 August 2008.

On 25 November 2019, Forrest Sherman captured a stateless dhow carrying two 358 missiles and a large cache of Iranian missile parts destined for Yemen.

On 13 April 2022, Forrest Sherman arrived at Naval Station Norfolk following a surge deployment. On 11 June, Forrest Sherman departed Naval Station Norfolk for a NATO deployment. Forrest Sherman served as the flagship of Standing NATO Maritime Group 2 from 1 July to 13 December.
