= Alim radar system =

Iranian passive radar

Alim
- Country of origin: Iran
- Type: Passive radar
- Range: 300 km (190 mi)

Alim is the first Iranian passive radar. Passive radars do not transmit. Instead, they detect and track objects by processing reflections from non-cooperative sources of illumination in the environment, such as commercial broadcast and communications signals.

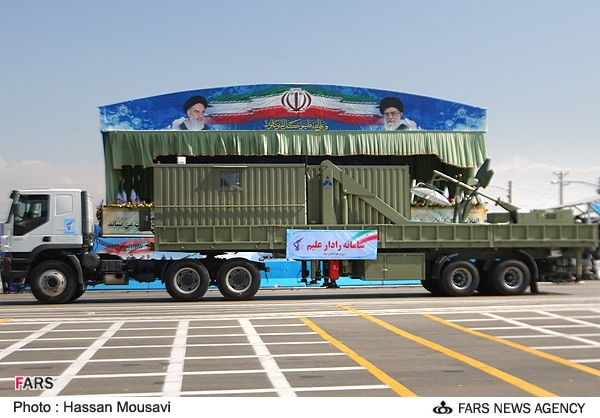
Alim Radar

Alim is cheaper and has lower maintenance cost than conventional radars because it lacks a transmitter and movable mechanical parts. It requires high processing power, as six levels of processing are needed to track targets. Other advantages include the ability to detect low RCS targets at low altitudes. Since it doesn't transmit, it is immune to anti radiation missiles such as American AGM-88 HARM, thus it can be deployed near enemy lines.

It was first seen in 2011 during the parade of Iranian armed forces. The radar has a stated range of between 250 and 300 km and is claimed to be able to detect slow, low flying targets with relative ease.

== See also ==
- Islamic Republic of Iran Armed Forces
- Defense industry of Iran
- List of equipment of the Iranian Army
- Iran Electronics Industries
