= Ahmad Meyghani =

Iranian retired military pilot

Amir Ahmad Meyghani
- احمد میقانی
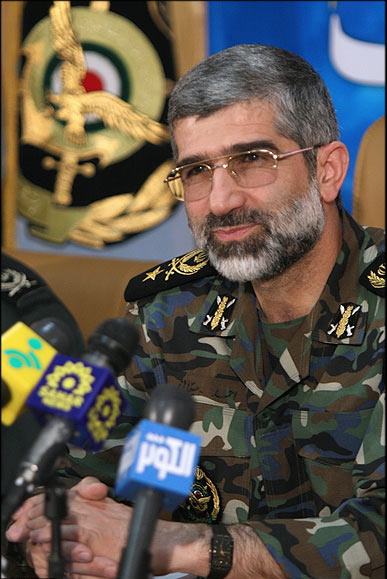
- Meyghani in 2009
- Born: 1957 (age 68–69); Shahrud, Pahlavi Iran
- Military career
- Allegiance: Pahlavi Iran (1975–1979); Iran (1979–present)
- Branch: Air Force (1975–2011); Air Defense Force (2008–)
- Service years: 1975–present
- Rank: Brigadier General Brigadier General
- Commands: Deputy to the Assistant for Strategic Affairs and General Oversight of the General Staff of the Armed Forces (2011–present); IRIA Air Force (2006–2008); IRIA Air Defense Force (2008–2011); Deputy for Planning, Programs and Budget, IRIA Air Force (?–2006)
- Conflicts: Iran–Iraq War; Insurgency in Sistan and Balochistan; Syrian civil war; Iranian intervention in Syria; War in Iraq (2013–2017); Iranian intervention in Iraq; Iran–PJAK conflict; Western Iran clashes; 2024 Iran–Israel conflict; Twelve-Day War; 2026 Iran war

Ahmad Meyghani (Persian: احمد میقانی, also spelled Meighani and Mighani) is an Iranian retired fighter pilot who currently serves as the second-in-command to the General Staff deputy for strategy. Before, he served as the commander of the Iranian army's air force and following the split of the air defense from the force, he was appointed as the inaugural commander of the latter. He piloted an F-14 Tomcat and has training with the aircraft.

== Biography ==
Ahmad Meyghani was born in 1957 in Shahroud. He completed his primary and secondary education in his hometown, graduating from high school in 1975. In October 1975, he enlisted in the Imperial Iranian Air Force, where he completed his primary pilot training at the Air Training Command before being sent to the United States for advanced flight training.

In February 1978, he began operational service as a fighter pilot at Air Force bases. Following the Iranian Revolution, he continued his service in the Islamic Republic of Iran Air Force. During the Iran–Iraq War, he participated in numerous combat missions both within Iran and across the border into Iraq.

Before being appointed Commander of the Air Force in 2006, Meyghani served in several senior positions, including Commander of the F-14 Training Squadron, Deputy Commander and Commander of Shahid Babai Air Region, and Deputy for Planning and Programs of the Islamic Republic of Iran Air Force

Military offices
Preceded by Karim Qavami	Commander of Islamic Republic of Iran Army Air Force; 27 October 2006–31 August 2008	Succeeded by Hassan Shahsafi
New title Branch created	Commander of Islamic Republic of Iran Army Air Defense Base; 31 August 2008–16 January 2011	Succeeded by Farzad Esmaili
