= Farzad Esmaili =

Iranian military officer (born 1972)

Amir Farzad Esmaili
- فرزاد اسماعیلی
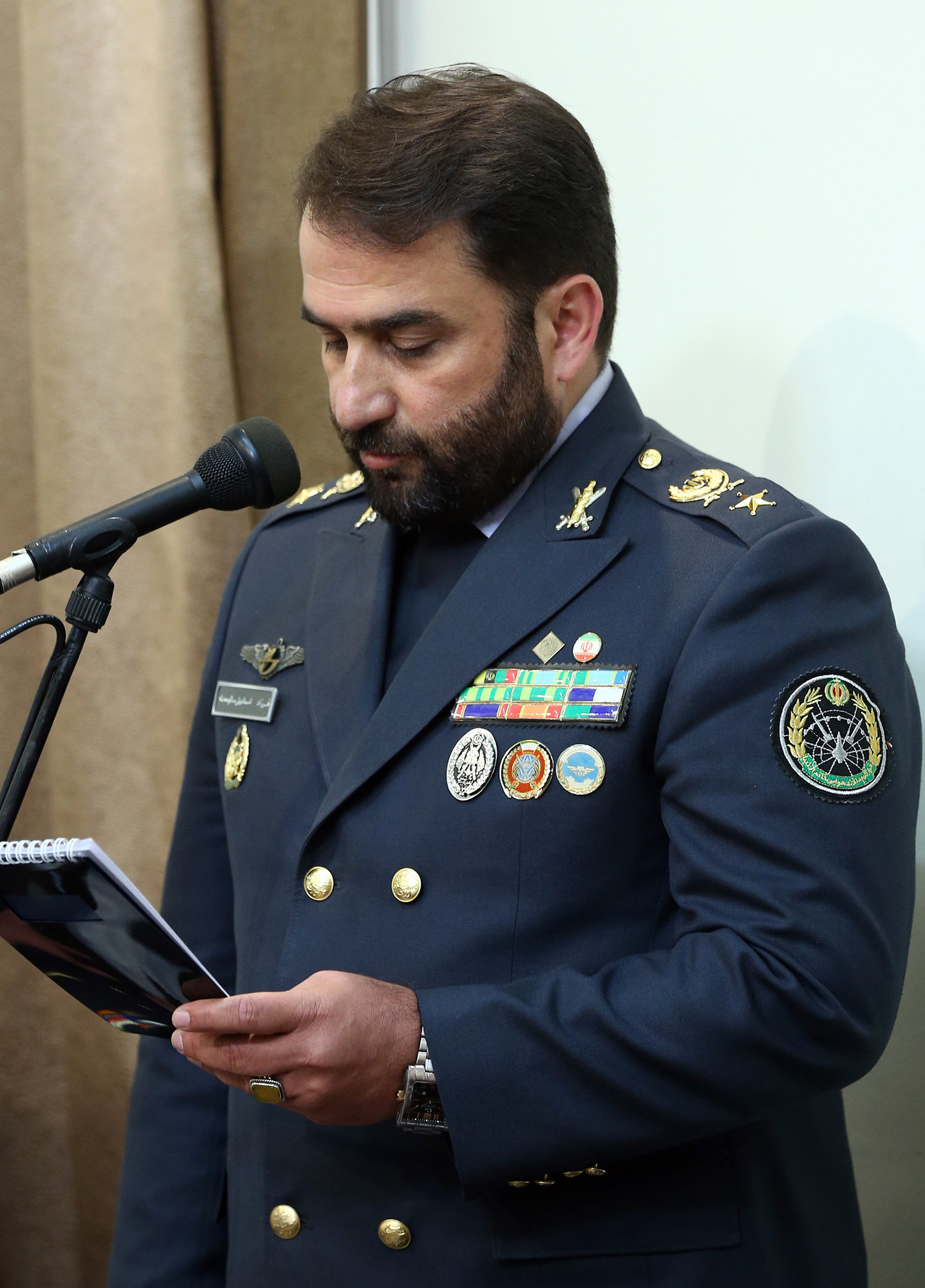
- Esmaeili in 2016

President of AJA University of Command and Staff
- Incumbent
- Assumed office 15 February 2026
- President: Masoud Pezeshkian
- Supreme Leader: Ali Khamenei; Mojtaba Khamenei
- Preceded by: Hossein Valivand

Assistant to the Commander-in-Chief of the Islamic Republic of Iran Army for Air Defense Affairs
- In office 29 May 2018 – 15 February 2026
- President: Hassan Rouhani; Ebrahim Raisi; Mohammad Mokhber (acting); Masoud Pezeshkian
- Supreme Leader: Ali Khamenei
- Preceded by: ?
- Succeeded by: Alireza Sabahifard

Commander of the Islamic Republic of Iran Air Defense Force
- In office 16 January 2011 – 29 May 2018
- President: Mahmoud Ahmadinejad; Hassan Rouhani
- Supreme Leader: Ali Khamenei
- Preceded by: Ahmad Meyghani
- Succeeded by: Alireza Sabahifard

Personal details
- Born: Farzad Esmaili Salu Mahalleh; 15 January 1972 (age 54) Salu Mahalleh, Rudsar, Pahlavi Iran

Military service
- Allegiance: Iran
- Branch/service: Air Force (1993–2008); Air Defense Force (2008–present)
- Years of service: 1993–present
- Rank: Brigadier General
- Battles/wars: Iran–U.S. RQ-170 incident 2019 Iranian shoot-down of American drone 2024 Iran–Israel conflict Twelve-Day War

Farzad Esmaili (Persian: فرزاد اسماعیلی; born 15 January 1972) is an Iranian military officer who President of the AJA University of Command and Staff since February 15 2026. He was formerly held office as the commander of the Air Defense Force. He served in the capacity between 2011 and 2018, when he was succeeded by his deputy Alireza Sabahifard. He was subsequently named as the assistant to the Commander-in-Chief of Islamic Republic of Iran Army for Air Defense Affairs.

== Biography ==
Farzad Esmaili was born on 15 January 1972 in the village of Salu Mahalleh, Rudsar County, Gilan province, Iran. He completed his primary and secondary education in Lahijan. In June 1989, he graduated from high school with a diploma in Mathematics and Physics. Following his success in the national university entrance examination, and motivated by an interest in a military career, he enrolled in the Command and Control Engineering program at the Air Force University. He entered the university on 6 January 1990 and graduated in 1993 with a bachelor's degree. Upon graduation, he was commissioned as a Second Lieutenant and began his active service in the Islamic Republic of Iran Army.

In 1994, Esmaili was assigned to the Dezful Air Defense Group, where he served as Training Officer, Radar Operations Evaluation Officer, and Deputy Chief of Radar Operations. In 2001, he was transferred to the Operations Directorate of the Air Defense Command, where he became Chief of the Training and Exercises Division.

In 2003, Esmaili was transferred to the Abdanan Air Defense Group, where he held several positions, including:

- Deputy Commander, Radar Site
- Commander, Radar Site
- Deputy Chief of Operations, Air Defense Group
- Deputy Commander, Air Defense Group

He was later assigned to the Operations Directorate of the Islamic Republic of Iran Air Force, serving as Director of Evaluation.

In 2008, Esmaili was transferred to the Operations Directorate of the Khatam al-Anbiya Air Defense Headquarters, where he served as Director of Radar Operations. From 2009 until 7 September 2010, he served as Deputy Commander for Intelligence and Reconnaissance of the headquarters.

Esmaili has also served as Commander of the Central Air Defense Region (Isfahan).

In 2002, he completed the Advanced Branch Officer Course, and in 2007 earned a Master's degree from the Command and Staff College (DAFOOS).

In 2010, Esmaili was promoted from Colonel to Brigadier General and, upon the recommendation of the Commander-in-Chief of the Islamic Republic of Iran Army and with the approval of the Supreme Leader of Iran, was appointed Commander of the Khatam al-Anbiya Air Defense Headquarters.

On 29 May 2018, he was relieved of his command by decree of the Commander-in-Chief of the Army and served as Assistant to the Commander-in-Chief of the Islamic Republic of Iran Army for Air Defense Affairs until 15 February 2026 when he was appointed President of AJA University of Command and Staff.

Military offices
Preceded by Ahmad Meyghani	Commander of the Islamic Republic of Iran Air Defense Force; 16 January 2011–29 May 2018	Succeeded by Alireza Sabahifard
