= Matla-ul-fajr =

Iranian early-warning radar

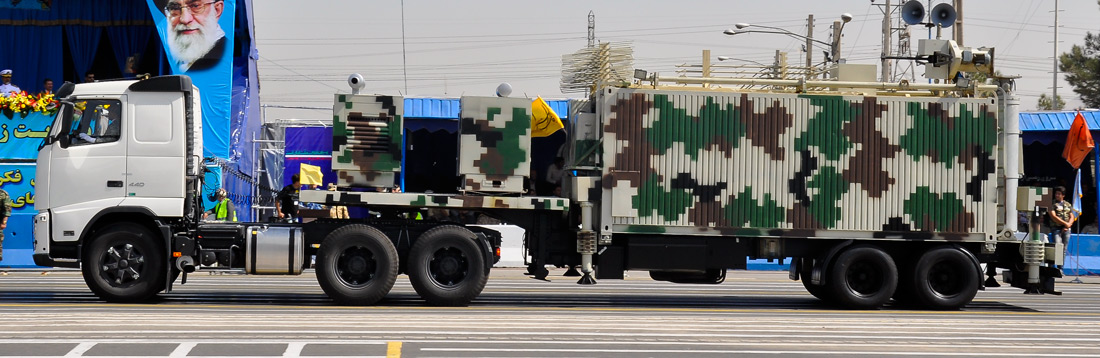
- Packed Matla-ul-Fajr radar in 2012.
- Country of origin: Iran
- Type: Early-warning radar
- Frequency: VHF
- Range: 480 km
- Azimuth: 0–90°
- Power: 4 kW

Matla-ul-fajr (Arabic مطلع‌الفجر lit. Rise of Dawn) is an Iranian VHF 3D radar. It was first seen in military parades. It was stated that Matla-ul-fajr covered the whole Persian Gulf. The range of Matla-ul-Fajr-1 is 300 km and the max altitude is 20,000 m. When fully set up, the height of the system reaches eight meters and it uses 12 "Yagi" antennas installed in two rows. The whole system, containing the antennas, setup instruments, processing, controlling and displaying units, communication devices and power generator are all installed on a trailer to achieve a very good mobility. The radar is also equipped with ECCM to survive in an e-warfare environment.

Matla-ul-fajr can use 100 different frequencies in the VHF band to operate in jammed environments.

In the same year, a project to enhance the capabilities of radar was started by SAIRAN and Isfahan University of Technology. Production of this model called Matla-ul-fajr 2 was started in 2012.

State-owned Mashregh News reported that Matla-ul-fajr 2 is a solid state 3D radar operating in VHF band. Due to the nature of its frequency, it can detect low-Radar cross-section targets such as stealth aircraft and cruise missiles with low accuracy at shorter ranges. The range of the radar is 480 kilometres (300 mi) and it uses two separate channels for detection and is installed on the back of heavy trucks to enhance mobility. This radar won the first place in Kwarazmi International Festival.

== See also ==
- Islamic Republic of Iran Armed Forces
- Defense industry of Iran
- List of equipment of the Iranian Army
- Iran Electronics Industries
