= Kashef =

Series of Iranian early warning radars

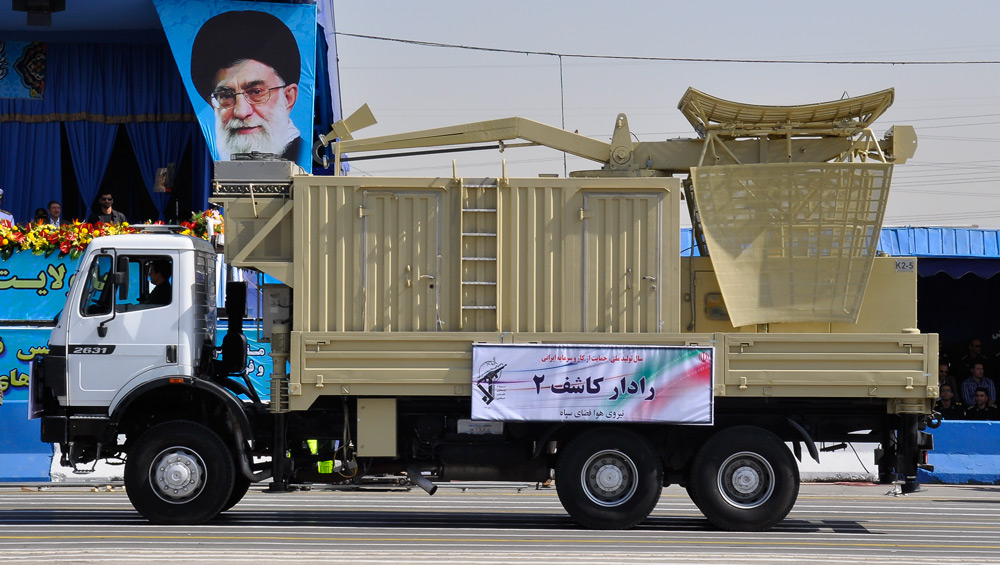
- Packed Kashef 2 radar moving in a parade.
- Country of origin: Iran
- Type: Early warning
- Frequency: S-Band
- PRF: 866, 1250, 1666 Hz
- Pulsewidth: 1, 0.8, 0.4 µs
- RPM: 3,6,12 RPM
- Range: 150 km (93 mi)
- Altitude: 14 km (8.7 mi)
- Power: 800 kW

Kashef is a series of Iranian early warning radars developed by SAIRAN. Currently there are three versions in service, Kashef 1, Kashef 2 and Kashef 99.

Kashef 1 is a 2D radar which operates in S-Band and has a range of 150 km. It uses two separate receivers that gives it good ECCM capability and the ability to detect low RCS targets. It can track up to 100 targets simultaneously. One of its main advantages is its high mobility because it can be mounted on trailers and set up and break down in 30 minutes. Kashef 1 is offered for export as TM-ASR-1 (Air Surveillance Radar 1).

Kashef 2 is externally very different from Kashef 1. It uses a different net-like antenna that can be split in 3 parts to reduce the time needed for setup and breakdown. The range is 200 km and the maximum number of targets it can track simultaneously is increased to 1000. It uses 30 kW of power. The receiver and transmitter of the radar are using solid state electronics to increase the radar's ECM resistance.

Kashef 99 is a 3D phased-array radar system that is carried on a vehicle, suitable for detecting small aircraft and objects and has a range of 12 km. Kashef-99 can detect 300 targets simultaneously.

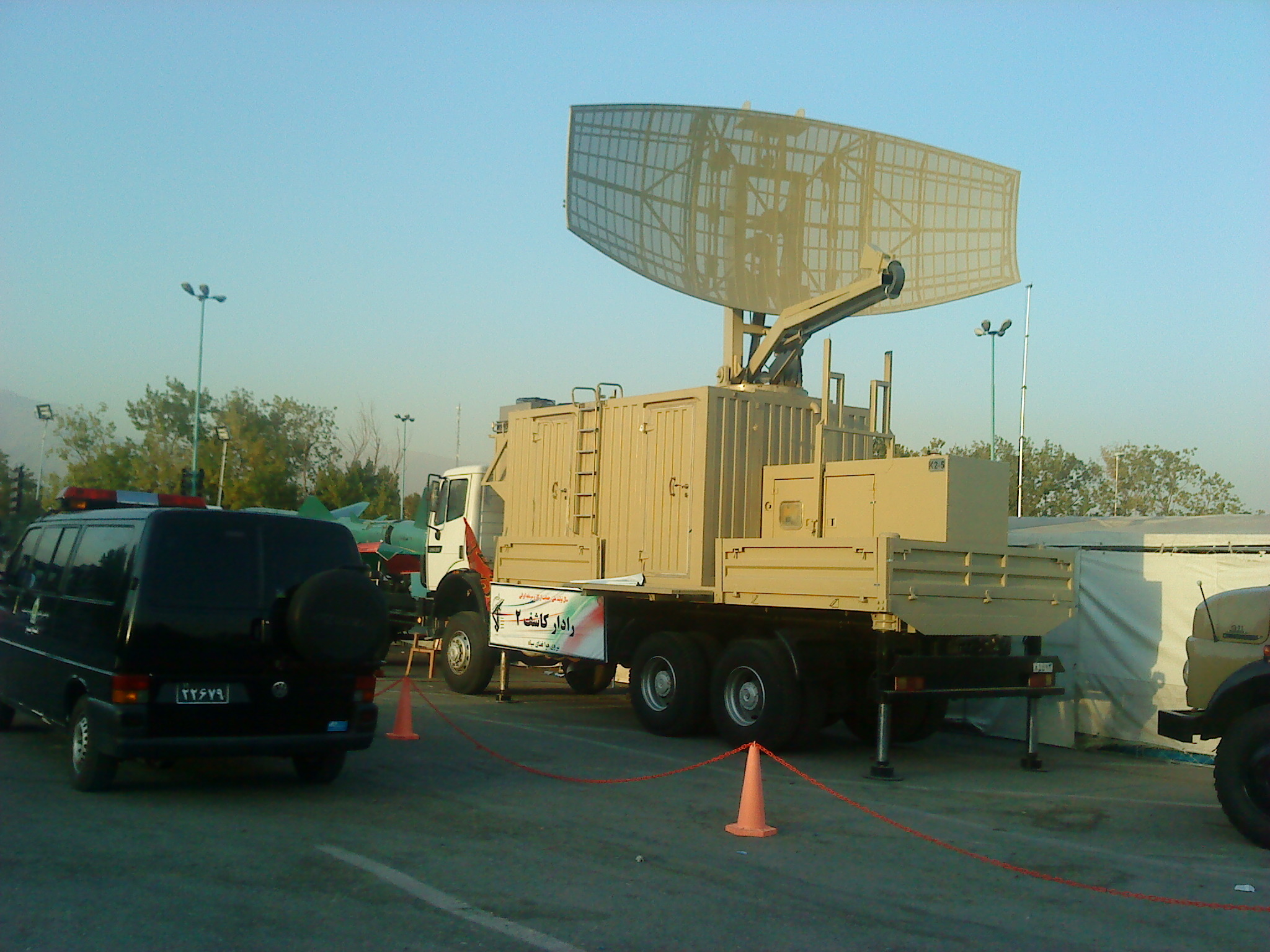
Kashef 2 radar system at Tehran exhibition 2012

== See also ==
- List of equipment of the Iranian Army
- Iran Electronics Industries
- Defense industry of Iran
- Islamic Republic of Iran Armed Forces
