= Sepehr (radar) =

Iranian over-the-horizon radar

Sepehr (Persian: سپهر, meaning "sky") is an over-the-horizon radar (OTH) developed by Iran.
Little is known of the project, except it has a reported range of 3,000 km. It was originally scheduled to enter operational status in 2013. In August 2013, Iran announced completion of a first phase of the project with a range of only 300–700 km. In 2014 Iran announced it wished to establish a space-based radar system. It was expected to be finalised by the end of 2014. It is currently operational.

== See also ==
- Russian Woodpecker
- Cobra Mist
- The Buzzer
- JORN
- Islamic Republic of Iran Air Defense Force Radar Systems
