= Alireza Sabahifard =

Iranian military officer

Amir Alireza Sabahifard
- علیرضا صباحی‌فرد
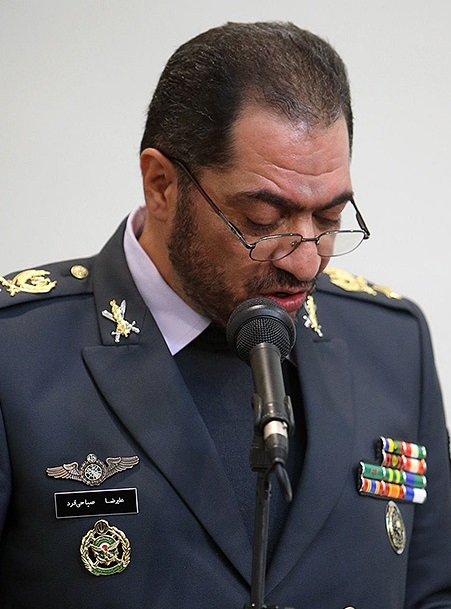
- General Sabahifard in 2018
- Born: Alireza Sabahifard; 21 March 1963 (age 63); Qom, Pahlavi Iran (present-day Iran)
- Military career
- Allegiance: Iran
- Branch: Air Force (1984–2008); Air Defense Force (2008–present)
- Service years: 1984–present
- Rank: Brigadier General
- Commands: Assistant to the Commander-in-Chief of the Islamic Republic of Iran Army for Air Defense Affairs (2026–present); Air Defense Force (2018–2025); Deputy Commander of the Air Defense Force (2010–2018); Khatam al-Anbia Air Defense Headquarters (2018–2019); Deputy Commander Khatam al-Anbia Air Defense Headquarters (2010–2018)
- Conflicts: Iran–Iraq War; Iran–U.S. RQ-170 incident 2019 Iranian shoot-down of American drone 2024 Iran–Israel conflict Twelve-Day War; 2026 Iran war

Alireza Sabahifard (Persian: علیرضا صباحی‌فرد; 21 March 1963) is an Iranian military officer who served as the commander of the Iranian Air Defense Force from 29 May 2018 to 15 December 2025. He was appointed to the position by Supreme Leader Ali Khamenei. He was succeeded by Alireza Elhami.

== Biography ==
Alireza Sabahi-Fard was born on 21 March 1963 in Qom, Iran. He joined the Islamic Republic of Iran Air Force in 1984 and pursued his military education in the Air Defense branch, graduating with a specialization in Surface-to-Air Operations.

Following graduation, Sabahi-Fard volunteered for deployment to the Omidieh operational area, where he served with the Omidieh Air Defense Region until the end of the Iran–Iraq War. During this period, he engaged Iraqi Air Force combat aircraft on numerous occasions and was credited with shooting down five Iraqi aircraft.[8]

He subsequently served as a Surface-to-Air Missile Operations Officer in the Omidieh, Isfahan, Bushehr, and Tehran Air Defense Regions.

In 1998, he completed the Advanced Branch Officer Course at the Shahid Khezraei Air Training Command, and in 2013 graduated from the Command and Staff College (DAFOOS).

Throughout his career, Sabahi-Fard has held numerous command appointments, including:

- Commander of Air Defense Units protecting the Gachsaran and Pazanan oil-producing regions during the Iran–Iraq War
- Chief of the Command Post (Skyguard Fire Unit Commander)
- Commander of the Velayat Air Defense Unit, responsible for air defense during the Supreme Leader's official visits throughout Iran
- Commander of the Tehran Surface-to-Air Missile Battalion
- Commander of the Shahid Motahhari Air Defense Unit
- Commander of the Shahid Sattari Rapid Reaction Air Defense Group
- Deputy Commander of the Northern Air Defense Region
- Commander of the Northern Air Defense Region

Sabahi-Fard has held the following senior appointments:

- Commander, Velayat Air Defense Unit
- Commander, Shahid Motahhari Air Defense Unit
- Commander, Shahid Sattari Rapid Reaction Air Defense Group
- Commander, Northern Air Defense Region (Tehran)
- Deputy Commander, Khatam al-Anbiya Air Defense Headquarters
- Commander, Khatam al-Anbiya Air Defense Headquarters
- Commander, Islamic Republic of Iran Air Defense Force

Military offices
Preceded by Farzad Esmaili	Commander of the Islamic Republic of Iran Air Defense Force; 29 May 2018–15 December 2025	Succeeded by Alireza Elhami
Preceded by Shahrokh Sahram	Deputy Commander of the Islamic Republic of Iran Air Defense Force; 2010–2018	Succeeded by Alireza Elhami
