= Salu Mahalleh =

Salu Mahalleh سالومحله
- Village
- Location within Iran
- Coordinates: 37°05′37″N 50°20′40″E
- Country: Iran
- Province: Gilan
- County: Rudsar
- Bakhsh: Central
- Rural District: Reza Mahalleh

Population (2006)
  - Total: 251
- Time zone: UTC+3:30 (IRST)
  - Summer (DST): UTC+4:30 (IRDT)

Salu Mahalleh (Persian: سالومحله, also Romanized as Sālū Maḩalleh) is a village in Reza Mahalleh Rural District, in the Central District of Rudsar County, Gilan Province, Iran. At the 2006 census, its population was 251, in 79 families.
