= JY-14 Radar =

Chinese air defense radar system

JY-14
- Country of origin: People's Republic of China
- Introduced: Unknown
- No. built: Unknown
- Type: Unknown
- Frequency: 1.5–2.1 GHz, E/F band
- PRF: -
- Beamwidth: -
- Pulsewidth: -
- RPM: -
- Range: 320 nautical miles (590 km)
- Altitude: -
- Diameter: 25 m
- Azimuth: 360°
- Elevation: 0 ~ 20°
- Precision: -
- Power: -

The JY-14 (domestic designation: LLQ302, formerly known as: 384) is a medium to long range air defense radar produced and used by the People's Republic of China. It is capable of detecting multiple targets within its range and determine their parameters, tracking them even through surface clutter and ECM jamming. It utilizes a frequency-agile mode with 31 different frequencies, has a large band of ECCM operating parameter frequencies, and uses linear FM compression. This system can simultaneously track up to 100 targets and can feed the data to missile-interceptor batteries. It can track targets flying as high as 75,000 feet (22,900 m) and 186 miles (299 km) in distance.

The system is notable for having wideband frequency diversity and adaptive pulse-to-pulse agility, enabling it to track even the most morphic radar signatures. It is the most common ground radar in China, and is rapidly being exported to other countries. The radar features excellent anticlutter and antijamming ability, as well as very good adaptability and automatization. Incorporated techniques include dual pulse frequency diversity, pulse-to-pulse frequency agility over a wide frequency band, adaptive MTI and CFAR techniques, and an advanced computerized BITE technique.

== Manufacturer ==
The system is manufactured by the East China Research Institute of Electronic Engineering (ECRIEE), No. 38 Research Institute (Chinese: 华东电工程研究所（中国电子科技集团公司第三十八研究所)).

The JY-14 system has been in production since 1998, and has since exported, most notably to Iran, Vietnam, Venezuela, Sri Lanka and Zimbabwe.

== Notable incidents ==
According to US intelligence, Iran has been purchasing the JY-14 radar system since the late 1990s, but China reportedly has accelerated the project since the start of U.S. military operations in Afghanistan.

Additionally, several JY-14 radars have been found operating in North Korea, Thailand and Indonesia, according to US intelligence sources, along the DMZ.

== Upgrades ==
The JY-14 can be upgraded to a more powerful power supply, giving it a wider range. This has been seen only in China so far, where multiple stations are tied together with the air defense system.

== Other specifications ==
- Frequency diversity interval: 150 MHz
- Wind resistance capacity: 25 m/s, normal operations, 25–35 m/s, operations with degraded performance, >35 m/s, operations stopped without damage.
  - High gain, low sidelobe and vertically offset multibeam antenna
  - Full coherent high power transmitter, multi-element modulator assembly
  - High stability, frequency synthesiser
  - low noise, wide frequency band, large dynamic range and frequency diversity multichannel receiver
  - Adaptive MTI
  - Adaptive threshold, automatic clutter map
