= Mesbah 1 =

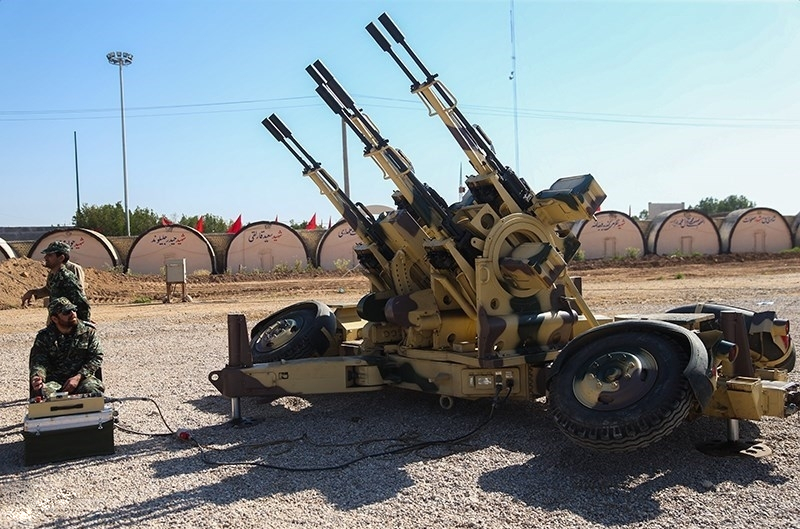
- Static Mesbah 1 system
- Type: Anti-aircraft system
- Place of origin: Iran

Production history
- Manufacturer: Defense Industries Organization
- Produced: 2010

Specifications
- Caliber: 23 mm (0.91 in)
- Rate of fire: 4000 rpm
- Muzzle velocity: 970 m/s (3,200 ft/s)
- Effective firing range: 2.5 km
- Maximum firing range: 4 km

Mesbah 1 is an Iranian anti aircraft artillery system developed to defend against incoming cruise missiles. It was unveiled in 2010 by Iranian defense minister Ahmad Vahidi and hit its intended target successfully in the test. Production started some months later.

== Design ==
Mesbah uses 4 Iranian built Russian ZU-23-2 installed on a rotatable mount. Each autocannon has its own feed magazine. Each ZU-23-2 has a reported fire rate of 2000 rpm. But surprisingly the whole system is reported to have a rate of 4000 rpm instead of 8000. This is probably because developers wanted it to save ammunition. The mount can rotate in different angles but the exact degrees are unknown.

The system uses Radar and IR/Optical sensors to find its target automatically. Its radar is described as a 3D flat-antenna radar with a good accuracy that finds and traces the target and gives its position to the fire control system.

Mesbah is described being able to engage both fixed and rotary wing aircraft and cruise missiles in low and very low altitudes. Its automatic control system makes it need less crew to operate and its sophisticated tracking and tracing algorithms makes it able to engage small targets like incoming missiles.

== Operators ==
- Iran
  - Armed Forces
    - Army
      - Air Defence Force

== See also ==
- Equipment of the Iranian Army
- Iranian military industry
- Military of Iran
