= Alireza Elhami =

Iranian brigadier general

Amir Alireza Elhami
- علیرضا الهامی
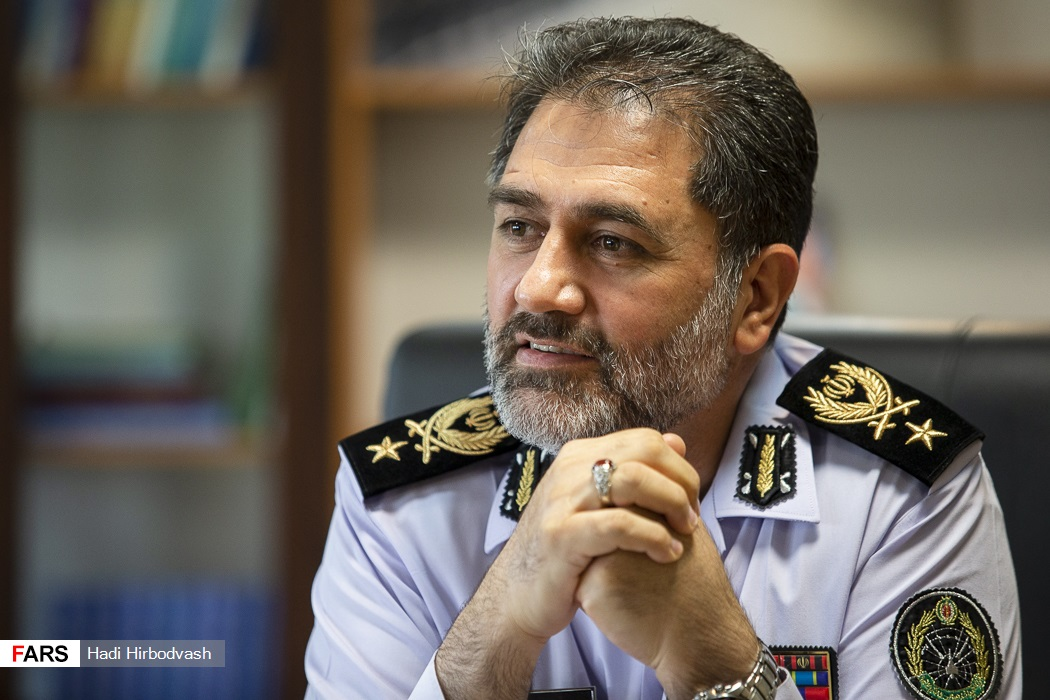
- Elhami in 2021
- Born: 1974 (age 51–52); Pahlavi Iran
- Military career
- Allegiance: Iran
- Branch: Air Defense Force
- Service years: 1990s–present
- Rank: Brigadier General
- Commands: Air Defense Force (2025–present); Deputy Commander of the Air Defense Force (2019–2025); Khatam al-Anbia Air Defense Headquarters (2025–present); Deputy Commander of Khatam al-Anbia Air Defense Headquarters (2018–2019)
- Conflicts: 2019 Iranian shoot-down of American drone 2024 Iran–Israel conflict Twelve-Day War; 2026 Iran war

Alireza Elhami (Persian: علیرضا الهامی) is an Iranian military officer with the rank of Brigadier General serving as the Commander of the Islamic Republic of Iran Air Defense Force and Khatem Al-Anbiya Air Defense Base since December 2025.

Alhami was born in 1974. He served as the Commander of Khatem Al-Anbiya University of Air Defense from 2013 to 2015, then served as the Deputy Head of the Operations Department of Khatem Al-Anbiya Air Defense Base until 2018, when he was promoted to the rank of Brigadier General and began serving as the Deputy Commander of the base until 2019. He then served as the Deputy Commander of the force until 15 December 2025, when he was appointed as the Commander.
