= 67N6E =

67N6E GAMMA DE is a 3D radar system developed by VNIIRT for the Russian Armed Forces. It is a mobile UHF L band Active electronically scanned array for the purpose of air defense support.
