= Kamin-2 =

Type of Air defense system

Mersad-16
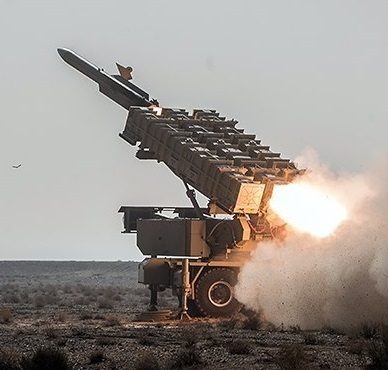
- The mersad-16 missile system on military truck
- Type: Air defense system
- Place of origin: Iran

Service history
- In service: 2018–present

Specifications
- Operational range: 100 km

The Mersad-16 missile system, also known as and Tactical Mersad is an Iranian road-mobile short-range air defense system derived from the Mersad air defense system. It was unveiled at a defense exhibition on 18 April 2018. It is designed reconnaissance and strike unmanned aerial vehicles (UAVs) as well as manned airplanes and helicopters flying at low altitudes. Iranian army airborne commander Yousef Qorbani had stated that this missile had its range doubled compared to the previous Mersad air defense system, he stated that due to the regional threats that Iran is facing, such weapons can be highly effective in short-range combat zones.

The most notable differences between Mersad 16 and its previous generations are as follows: Tacticalizating all system components by installing on a truck, using new phased-array radar of 'Hafez' and 'Najm 804' replacing the older kavosh (MPQ-50 variant) radar, Using a canister launcher for missiles, and using the new 'Shalamcheh 2' missile extending the range to over 100 km. The missile has Solid fuel motor, warhead, SARH seeker, actuators, fuses are re-used, and IMU and datalink added
