= ZU-23-2 =

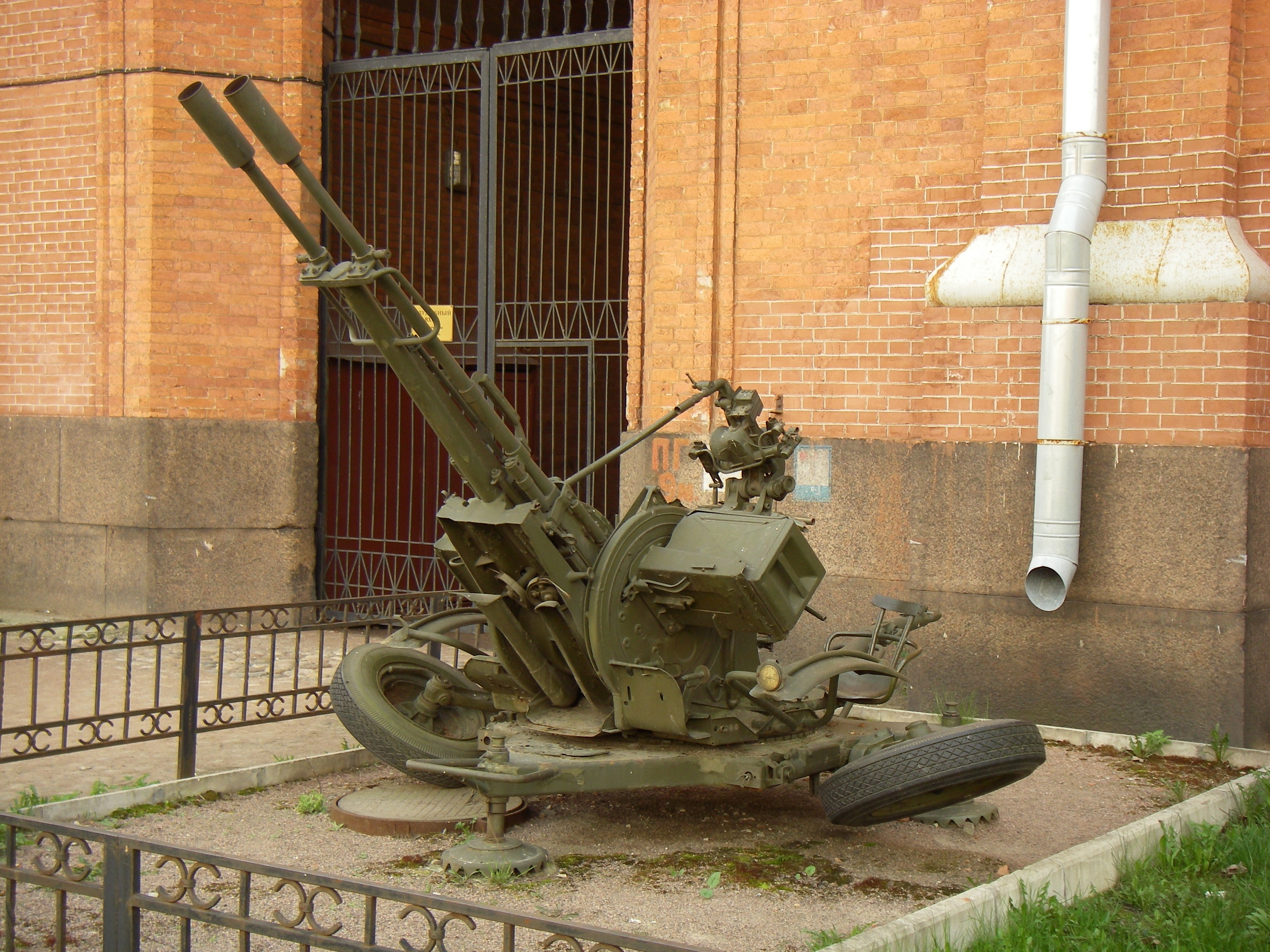
- A ZU-23-2
- Type: Towed 23 mm anti-aircraft twin autocannon
- Place of origin: Soviet Union

Service history
- In service: 1960–present
- Used by: See Operators section
- Wars: Angolan Civil War; South African Border War; Ethiopian Civil War; Lebanese Civil War; Soviet–Afghan War; Western Sahara War; Somali Civil War; Iran–Iraq War; United States invasion of Grenada; Second Sudanese Civil War; Siachen conflict Operation Praying Mantis; Gulf War; Georgian Civil War; First Chechen War; Second Chechen War; War in Afghanistan (2001–2021); South Lebanon conflict (1985–2000); 2006 Lebanon War; Russo-Georgian War; First Libyan Civil War; Sudanese conflict in South Kordofan and Blue Nile; Syrian Civil War; Northern Mali conflict Russo-Ukrainian War; War in Donbas; Second Libyan Civil War; Yemeni Civil War (2014–present); Tigray War; Russo-Ukrainian war War in Amhara; Sudanese civil war (2023–present); 2025 India–Pakistan conflict Iran–Israel war 2026 Afghanistan–Pakistan war

Production history
- Designer: KBP Instrument Design Bureau
- Designed: Late 1950s
- Produced: 1960–present
- Variants: See Variants and upgrades

Specifications (ZU-23-2)
- Mass: 0.95 tonnes (2,094 lbs)
- Length: 4.57 m (10 ft)
- Barrel length: 2.008 m (79.1 in) (87.3 calibers)
- Width: 2.88 m (9 ft 5 in)
- Height: 1.22 m (4 ft)
- Crew: 2 (gunner and commander)
- Shell: 23x152B
- Caliber: 23 mm
- Barrels: 2
- Action: Gas operated
- Elevation: −10° to +90°
- Traverse: 360°
- Rate of fire: 2000 rpm cyclic, 400 rpm practical (per cannon)
- Effective firing range: 2.5 km (2 miles) effective range
- Feed system: 2x 50 round belt

The ZU-23-2, also known as ZU-23, is a Soviet towed 23×152mm anti-aircraft twin-barreled autocannon. ZU stands for Zenitnaya Ustanovka (Russian: Зенитная Установка) – anti-aircraft mount. The GRAU index is 2A13.

== Development history ==
The ZU-23-2 was developed in the late 1950s. It was designed to engage low-flying targets at ranges up to 2.5 km as well as armoured vehicles at a range of two kilometres and for direct defence of troops and strategic locations against air assault usually conducted by helicopters and low-flying airplanes. In 1955, KBP presented the single-barrel ZU-1 and the twin-barrel ZU-14. While the former was eventually dropped, the ZU-14 was selected and, after some modifications, entered series production.

In the Soviet Union, some 140,000 units were produced. The ZU-23 has also been produced under licence by Bulgaria, Poland, Egypt and the People's Republic of China.

Development of this weapon into a self-propelled anti-aircraft gun led to the ZSU-23-4 Shilka.

== Description ==
The ZU-23-2 (2A13) mounts two 23 mm autocannons on a small trailer which can be converted into a stationary mount for firing the guns. While in this position the wheels are moved aside. The autocannon can be prepared for firing from the march position in 30 seconds and in emergency can be fired from the traveling position. The weapon is aimed and fired manually, with the help of the ZAP-23 optical-mechanical sight which uses manually entered target data to provide limited automatic aiming. It also has a straight-tube telescope T-3 for use against ground targets such as infantry as well as unarmored or lightly armoured vehicles. The ammo is fed by a conveyor belt from two ammunition boxes. Each of the ammunition boxes is located on the side of the twin autocannon and each carries 50 rounds. The fumes created by firing the weapon are partially removed through the side openings in the barrels.

Normally, once each barrel has fired 100 rounds it becomes too hot and is therefore replaced with a spare barrel. Each weapon is normally provided with two replacement barrels as part of its standard equipment. Tulamashzavod Joint Stock Company is offering to upgrade the 2A14 guns to the 2A14M standard with a barrel life of 10,000 rounds instead of 8,000 rounds.

The cannon carriage is based on the earlier ZPU-2 anti-aircraft twin heavy machine gun, which mounted two KPV 14.5×114mm heavy machine guns. ZU-23-2 can be identified by different placement of the ammunition boxes (at right angles to the gun carriage) and by muzzle flash suppressors. In another similarity to the ZPU series, single-barrel and four-barrel versions of the ZU-23 were also developed. However, these versions never entered service.

The ZU-23-2 can be towed by a number of different vehicles. In USSR and later Russia the most frequently used towing vehicles for it were GAZ-66 4x4 trucks and GAZ-69 4x4 light trucks.

The weapon is known in the Finnish forces colloquially as Sergei.

== Ammunition ==
The 23 mm AA gun utilizes the same 23x152B case as the wartime VYa aircraft autocannon. Due to different loadings and primers the ammunition is not interchangeable, however: ammunition of the anti-aircraft cannon can be identified from its steel casings, ammunition for the aircraft cannon having brass cases instead. The following table lists the main characteristics of some of the available 23x152B ammunition used in 23 mm AA guns:

Designation	Type	Projectile Weight [g]	Bursting charge [g]	Muzzle Velocity [m/s]	Description
BZT	API	190	?	970	Blunt AP steel core, with incendiary charge inside windshield cap. Penetration 15 mm RHA at 1000 m range and 30 degree impact angle (from perpendicular), tracer burn time 5 seconds.
OFZ	HE	184	19	980	HE fragmentation round with nose fuzes incorporating self-destruct mechanism.
OFZT	HE-T	188	13	980	HE fragmentation round with a reduced HE charge due to the space taken by the tracer; tracer burn time 5 seconds.
APDS-T	APDS-T	103	none	1220	A Polish sub-caliber armour-piercing round with tracer, introduced in 2008. Penetration 30 mm RHA at 1000 m range and 30 degree impact angle (from perpendicular), tracer burn time >2.5 s.

Not only the gun itself but also the ammunition is produced in several countries. In Bulgaria, the company ARCUS Co. produces rounds and fuses for the 2A7 and 2A14 guns.

== Service history ==
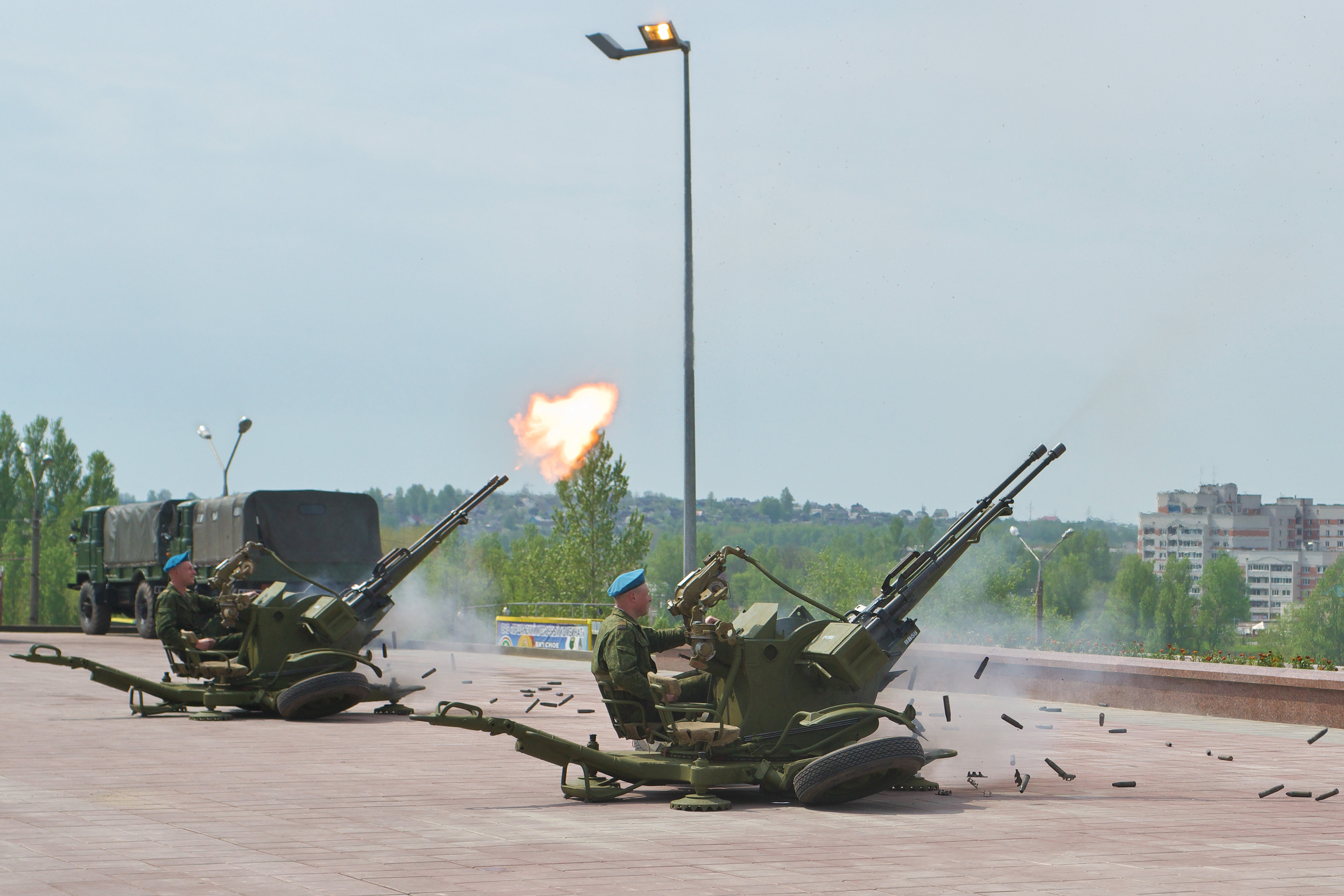
ZU-23-2 firing. Vitebsk, Belarus

The ZU-23-2 first entered service with the Soviet Army in 1960. The gun is often mounted on trucks for use in both anti-aircraft and direct fire support roles. It can also be mounted on the roof of the MT-LB multi-purpose tracked APCs. A specially modified three-legged ZU-23-2 autocannon is used as the base for the BTR-DG airborne SPAAG. Cheap, easy to operate and still effective, the ZU-23-2 is still used by the Russian Army and by more than 20 other armies.

From 1965 onwards, the Soviet Union began supplying the Democratic Republic of Vietnam with large shipments of weapons. The 23 mm ZU-23-2 was, along with the 37 mm M1939, the most frequently encountered anti-aircraft gun in Vietnam. Given that 83% of the USAF losses came from ground fire, the ZU-23 was probably responsible for shooting down hundreds of aircraft.

During the Soviet–Afghan War, the Soviet forces placed ZU-23-2 sets in the occupied areas to secure their positions, employing them in both the static defense and direct fire support roles. In the later Afghan Civil War, the main belligerents, the Taliban and the Northern Alliance forces also employed ZU-23-2 autocannons mounted on BMP-1 and BTR-70 APCs or GAZ-66 and ZIL-131 trucks, along with SA-7 Grail or Stinger Missiles, as their primary air-defense and direct fire support weapons.

The ZU-23-2 was extensively employed during the Lebanese Civil War, mounted on a variety of civilian and military vehicles, including M113 and BTR-152 APCs, Dodge Ram (1st generation) pickup trucks, AIL M325 Command Cars, Toyota Dyna U10-series trucks, Dodge W600 medium-duty trucks and M35A1/A2 trucks. They proved very useful in urban combat, being employed in the direct fire support role by the Syrian Army, the Palestine Liberation Organization (PLO) guerrilla factions and the various Christian and Muslim Lebanese militias. In late 1983, the ZU-23-2 was used on attacks against dug-in positions held by U.S. Marine ground units serving with the Multinational Force in Lebanon (MNF II). At the time, a Marine spokesman described such antipersonnel use of the weapon as a violation of the laws of war; however, writing for the Marine Corps Gazette in 1988, Maj. W. Hays Parks dismissed this allegation as incorrect.

During the Gulf War of 1991, it was a favorite weapon of the Iraqi Army, albeit used more often against ground targets such as infantry and light enemy vehicles. They tended to use it more against ground targets as the ZU-23-2 is ineffective against fast-moving jet aircraft, though later on it was proven to be relatively ineffective as it inflicted few casualties throughout the war.

The ZU-23-2 also saw usage during the Georgian Civil War and at least one kill was claimed by a ZU-23-2, when Georgian forces shot down a Sukhoi Su-25 fighter-bomber jet on 4 June 1993.

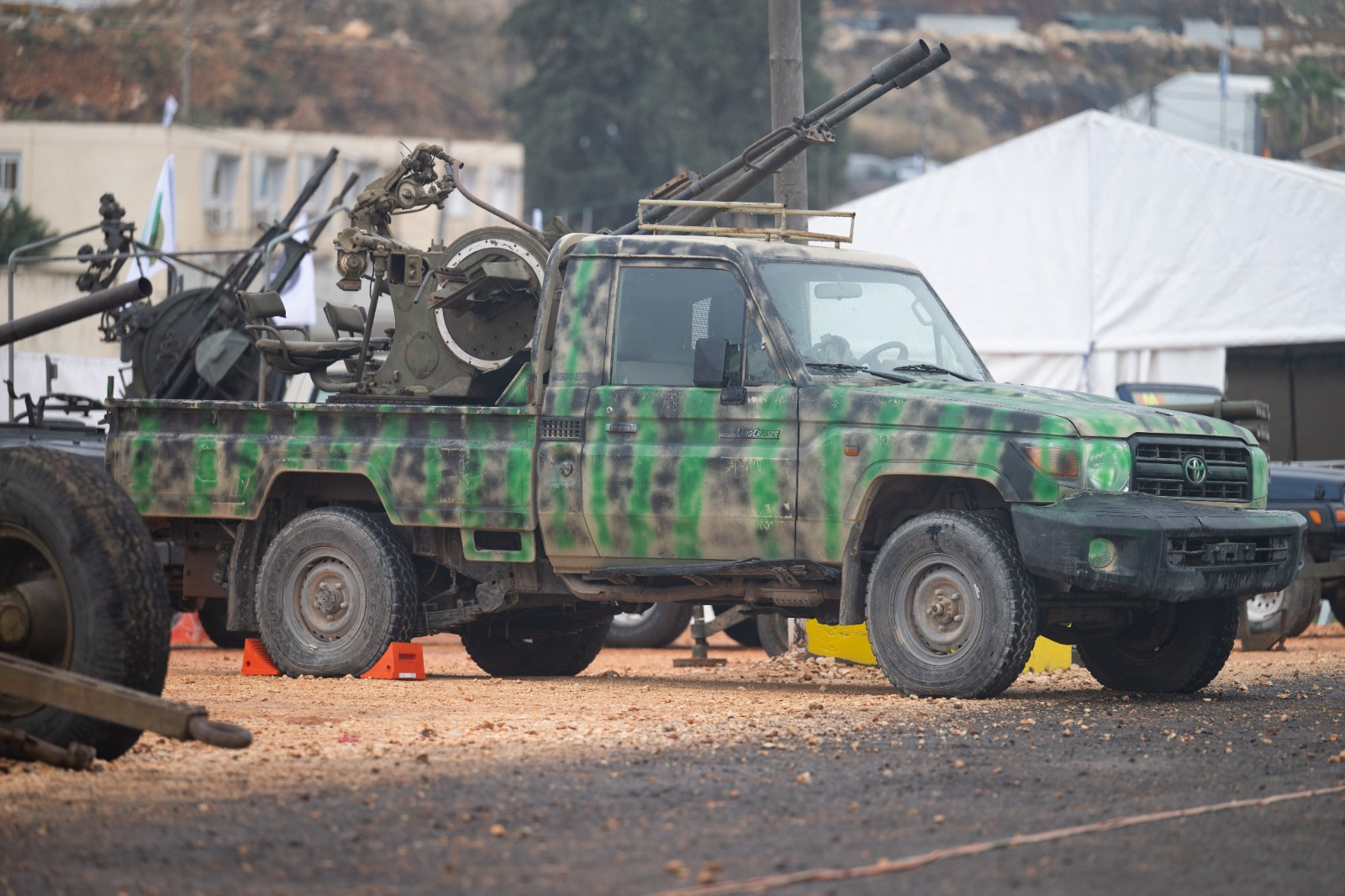
ZU-23-2 on a pickup truck used in the Gaza war in 2024

The ZU-23-2 had seen widespread use by both sides in the Libyan Civil War, being often mounted on technical pickup trucks. The weapon has also been heavily used in the Syrian Civil War, being installed on pickup trucks and is credited for bringing down several Syrian Air Force helicopters. Technicals equipped with ZU-23-2 autocannons have also been frequently employed against moving ground targets. During the Yemeni Civil War, ZU-23-2 autocannons are said to have engaged Saudi tanks.

On 4 May 2020, ZU-23 was used by Ethiopian troops stationed in Somalia as part of the African Union Mission to Somalia (AMISOM) to mistakenly shoot down an Embraer EMB 120RT Brasilia transporting medical supplies and mosquito nets while on approach to Bardalee, Somalia, killing all six people on board. The confusion arose from the fact the airplane was approaching from the west, instead of the usual easterly landing direction, and overflew the airfield at a low altitude due to animals on or in the vicinity of the runway. Ethiopian soldiers interpreted these facts as indicative of a suicide plane looking to strike targets within the base camp, and responded with fire.

The ZU-23-2, along with Bofors L/70, was used by the Indian Army Air Defence to shoot down multiple drones during the 2025 India–Pakistan conflict. The Taliban also employed the ZU-23-2 against the PAF airstrikes on Bagram airfield during the 2026 Afghanistan-Pakistan war.

== Variants and upgrades ==
=== Soviet Union/Russian Federation ===
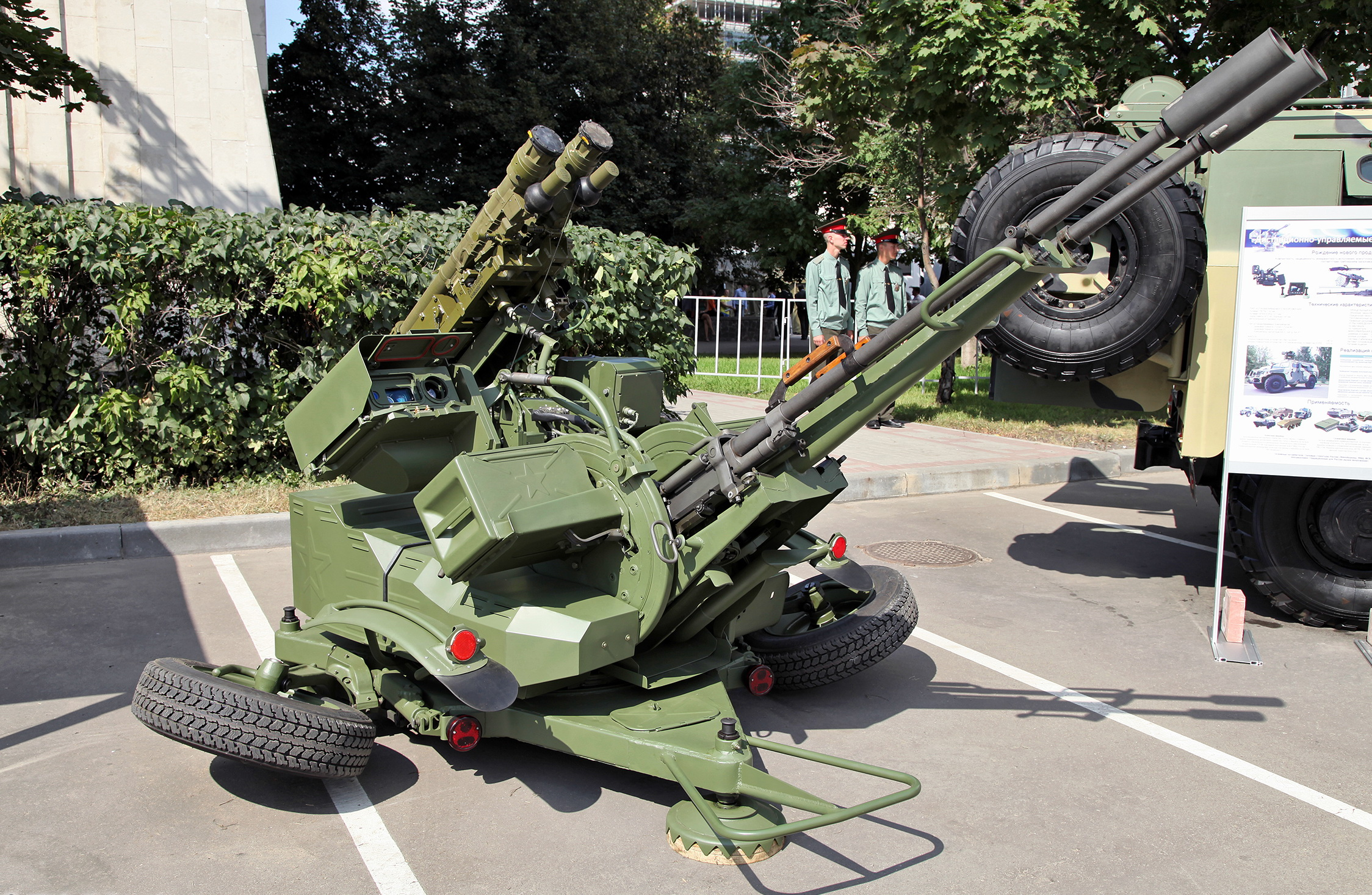
Modified ZU-23/30M1-3

- ZU-23M – Upgraded variant, designed by the Nudelman Precision Engineering Design Bureau (KB Tochmash). Has new targeting system (which includes laser rangefinder, television channel, optical mechanic device, can be reinforced with thermo location channel and a television system for usage at night) and electromechanic turn system. Optionally, the mount can be fitted with two short-range air-defence missiles, such as the 9M32M "Strela-2M" or the 9M39 "Igla".
- ZU-23M1 – This is the current model, developed by Open Joint Stock Company Podolsky Electromechanical Plant of Special Engineering "PEMZ Spetsmash" and Closed Joint Stock Company "NTC Elins" and offered by Rosoboronexport. Like the ZU-23M, it has an upgraded fire control system and can optionally be fitted with two launchers for the "Igla" series missile, usually the 9M342 "Igla-S".
  - The complete air-defence gun/missile system is called ZU-23/ZOM1 (often erroneously called "ZU-23/30M1"). It consists of the "missile-gun firing module" (strel'bovoj modul) ZU-23/ZOM1-SM; the "missile-launching module" (puskovoj modul) ZU-23/ZOM1-PM armed with four 9M333 "Strela-10" missiles; a remote control module (modul distantsionnogo upravleniya) ZU-23/ZOM1-MU and a portable generator AB-1. Depending on the wishes of the client, the system can be delivered without the -SM module (ZU-23/ZOM1-1), without the -PM module (ZU-23/ZOM1-2), without the remote control (ZU-23/ZOM1-3), or without -PM and -MU modules (ZU-23/ZOM1-4). The latter can be carried by the Samum 4x4 wheeled chassis vehicle and the first export contract has been signed as of early 2019.

=== Polish People's Republic / Poland ===
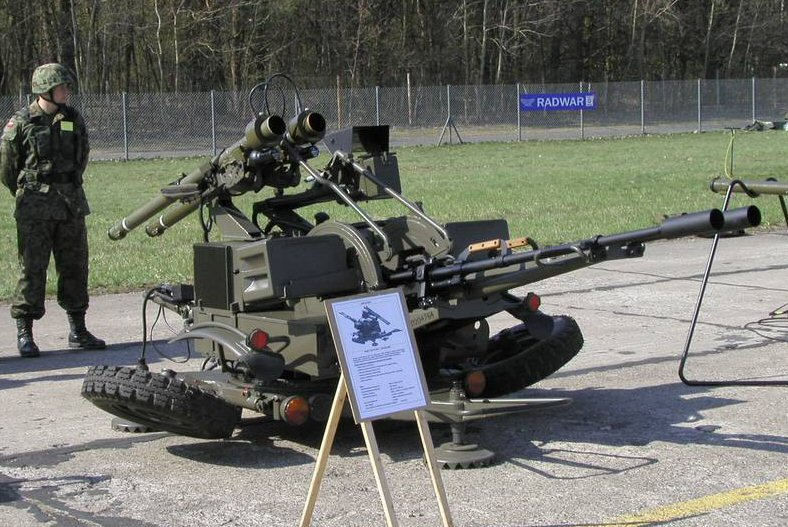
ZUR-23-2KG

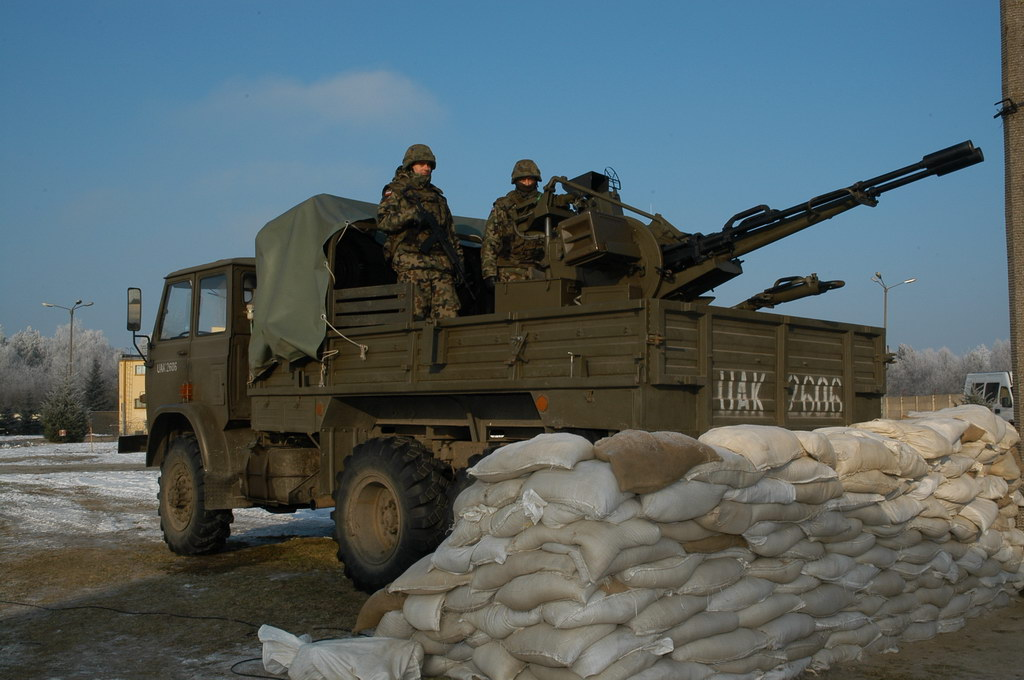
Star 266 mounted ZUR-23-2KG gun (Hibneryt)

- ZU-23-2 – Polish designation for basic gun variant. Manufactured under license in Zakłady Mechaniczne Tarnów (ZMT Tarnów) since 1972.
- ZUR-23-2S Jod – Polish variant with electro-optical sight GP-1R and twin launcher for Strela-2M missiles, used from 1988.
  - ZUR 23-2KG Jodek-G – Development of ZUR-23-2S with more advanced reflex sight CKE-2 (later CP-1 night-and-day sight with laser rangefinder), electromechanic gun turn system and twin launcher for Grom missiles, produced from 2002.
    - ZUR-23-2KG-I – Improved export version for Indonesia with CKE-2I sight.
    - TR-23-2 – Training simulator version of the ZUR-23-2KG-I. The set consists of an instructor's station and a gunner's station (a modified "artillery-missile unit" with the sight replaced by a computer station). Both stations are linked by a wireless network.
  - ZUR 23-2SP Jodek-SP – Version used in PSRA Pilica VSHORAD system.
  - Kobra – Polish export short-range modular air-defense system. A typical battery consists of up to 6 guns (for example ZUR-23-2 kg), up to 6 Poprad systems, a WD-95 command post and a Radwar MMSR radar.
  - Hibneryt – A ZU-23-2 family gun mounted on specially modified Star 266 truck, truck is fitted with additional ammunition for the gun and modified electrical installation to power guns electromechanic turn system (gun can also work from batteries).
  - ZU-23-2M Wróbel – Polish naval version of ZU-23-2, hydraulically powered, produced from 1979.
  - ZU-23-2MR Wróbel-II – Polish naval version of ZUR-23-2S, with Strela-2M missiles and water-cooled barrels, produced from 1986

=== Czech Republic ===
- ZU-23-2M2 Vlara – Field upgrade modernization kit.

=== Slovak Republic ===
- ZU-23M – Upgraded version with automatic fire control system, developed by the EVPU company. This version is offered by EVPU and the Punj Lloyd Ltd of India to the Indian army.

=== Egypt ===
- ZU 23-M – Licence version of the ZU-23. It is also known as SH-23M and is produced by Abu Zaabal Engineering Industries (Factory 100).
  - Nile 23 – Self-propelled version on the tracked M113. A system consists of the combat vehicle with ZU 23-M guns and surface-to-air missiles Saqr Eye, and a tracker vehicle, also based on the M113.
  - Sinai 23 – Similar to the Nile 23, with two Zu-23 guns and six Saqr-Eye missiles mounted on a TA-23E turret and fitted with a RA-20S E-band radar. Developed by Dassault and selected by Egypt in preference to Nile 23, entering service by 1992. Instead of the Saqr Eye, FIM-92 Stinger missiles can be used.

=== Finland ===
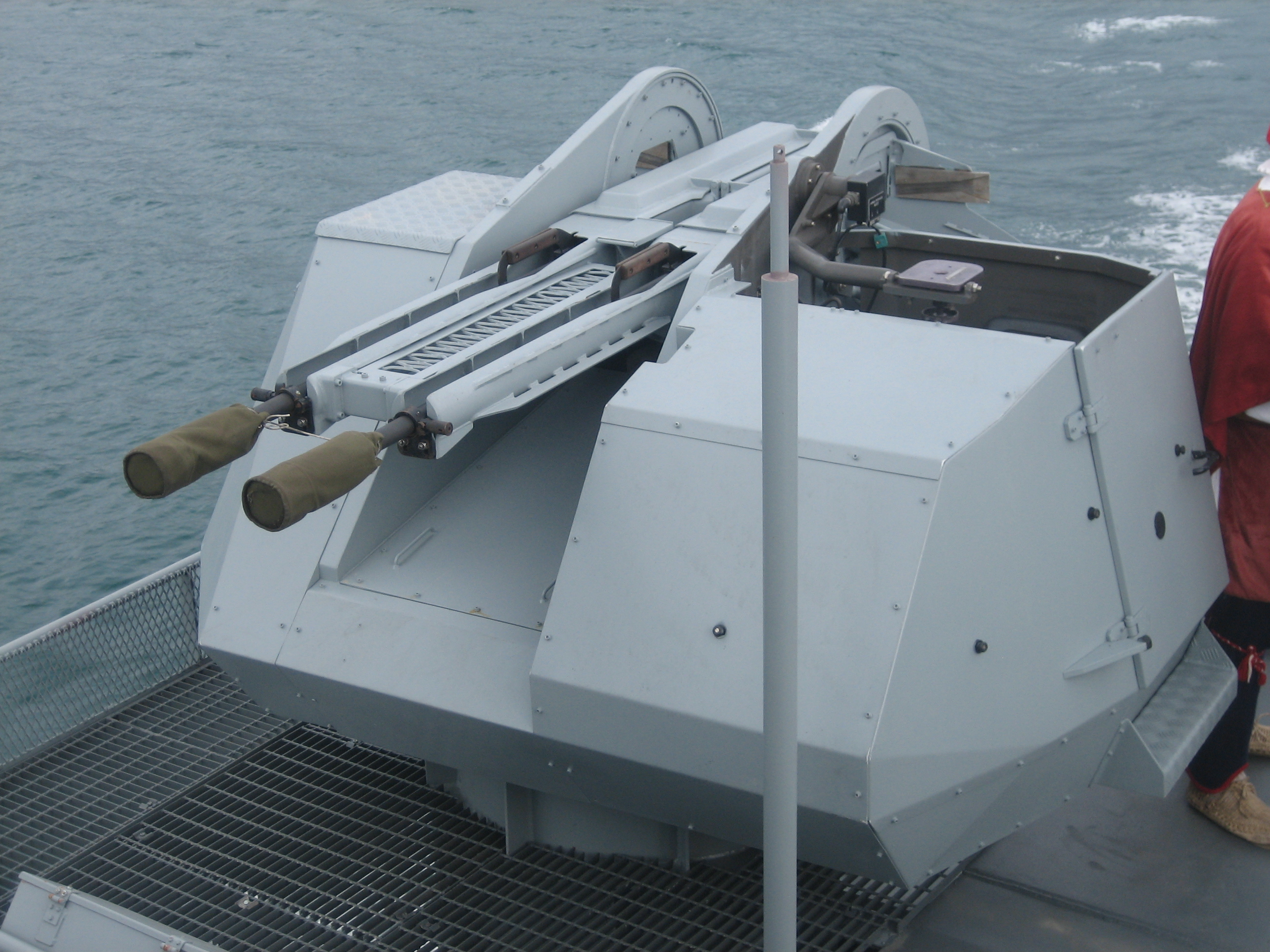
Sako 23 M85

- 23 ItK 95 – Finnish upgrade of the original 23 ItK 61, designed by Instrumentointi Oy and Vammas Oy. The upgrade adds gyro-stabilization to the gun, along with an APU and a laser rangefinder.
- SAKO 23 mm/87 – a navalized modernization used by the Finnish Navy. Variants are the 23 M74, the 23 M77, the 23 M80 and the 23 M85, last of which is a comprehensive rebuild with a new cradle and carriage. The guns can be removed from M85 carriage and replaced with six Mistral surface-to-air missiles.

=== China ===
- Type 85/YW 306 – Reverse-engineered copy of the ZU-23-2, made by NORINCO. Initially it was offered for export as the G-AA-01. It is referred to as Type 85 gun by some sources.
  - Giant Bow – Also known as Shengong (Deity Bow, 神弓). This is the name of an air-defense system, which consists of up to eight Type 85 guns and a battery command vehicle (BCV).
  - Giant Bow II a.k.a. Shengong-II – This is a more modern version of the Giant Bow and is offered for export since 2005. Apart from the 23 mm guns, it also comprises TY-90 missile launchers and a 3D radar.
- Type 87 – Upgraded version with twin 25 mm guns for 25x183B ammunition such as the PG87. After a failed initial design, an improved design was developed in 1979 and ready for evaluation in 1984. The Type 87 gun was accepted for service in 1987. It has the same layout as the original model and consists of two automatic, recoil-operated cannons, a two-wheel cartridge, a Type 86 infrared tracking sight and two 40-round ammunition magazines. The Type 87 fires in either single shot or burst mode, with a cyclic rate of fire of 600~700 rounds/min and has a muzzle velocity of 1,050 m/s.
  - PGZ95 – self-propelled version of the Type 87.

=== Iran ===
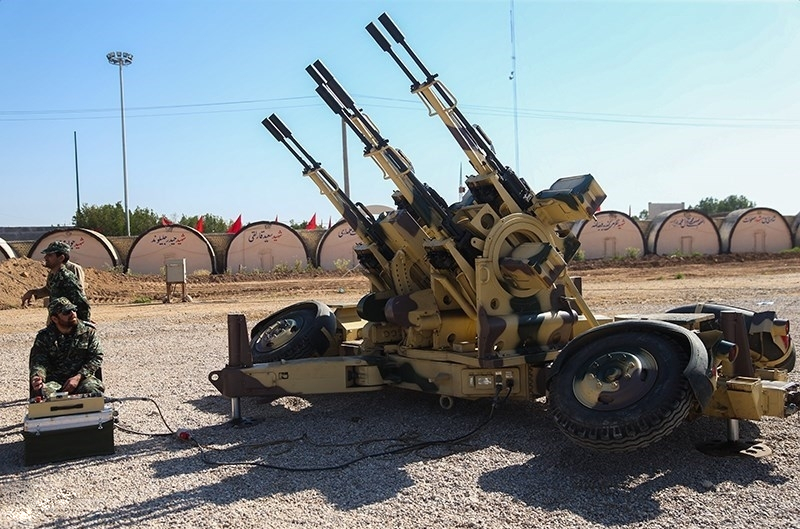
One Mesbah-1 in 2019.

- Mesbah-1 – Iranian-made air-defence and anti cruise missile system with four ZU-23 mounts. For the first time presented in 2010.
- ZU-23-6 (unofficial designator) – Similar to the Mesbah-1 but with only 6 instead of 8 barrels. This was probably the pre-series model of the Mesbah-1.

=== Vietnam ===
- 23mm-2M (alternatively 23-2M) – an Israeli-Vietnamese co-developed gun turrets solution for the Vietnam Coast Guard patrol vessels. Upgrades include a cabin for the gunner, electromechanic turn system & modern controlling systems as alternatives to the legacy pure-mechanical systems. Ballistic computer & fire-control system are optional.
  - 23mm-2ML (or 23-2ML) – mostly identical to the above 23-2M except the addition of an optronics sensor and laser rangefinder for better targeting performance & accuracy as well as the potential integration of digital fire-control system.
- Projects to "mechanize" the ZU-23-2 consist of the installation of the platform on Soviet ZIL-131, Russian KamAZ-43118 6x6 trucks or the American M548 tracked cargo carriers are chosen and commissioned by the Vietnam People's Army. Solutions for a remotedly/automatically controlled ZU-23-2 weapon station are also being developed.

== General characteristics ==
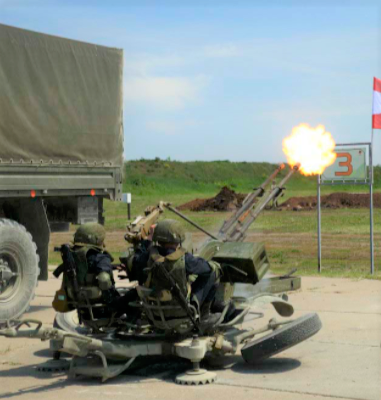
A salvo from the ZU-23 anti-aircraft gun

- Overall dimensions in firing position
  - Length: 4.57 m (15 ft)
  - Width: 2.88 m (9.44 ft)
  - Height: 1.22 m (4 ft)
- Weight: 0.95 tonnes (2,094 lbs)
- Armament: two 2A14 Afanasyev-Yakushev 23x152mm (.90 in) autocannons
- Barrel length: 2 m (6.5 ft)/ 87.3 calibers
- Muzzle velocity: 970 m/s (3,182 ft/s)
- Projectile weight: 186 g (6.27 oz)
- Rate of fire
  - Cyclic: 2,000 rounds per minute
  - Practical: 400 rounds per minute
- Effective range: 2-2.5 km (1.24-1.55 mi)
- Effective altitude: 1,500-2,000 m (4,921-6,562 ft)
- Crew: 6

== Operators ==
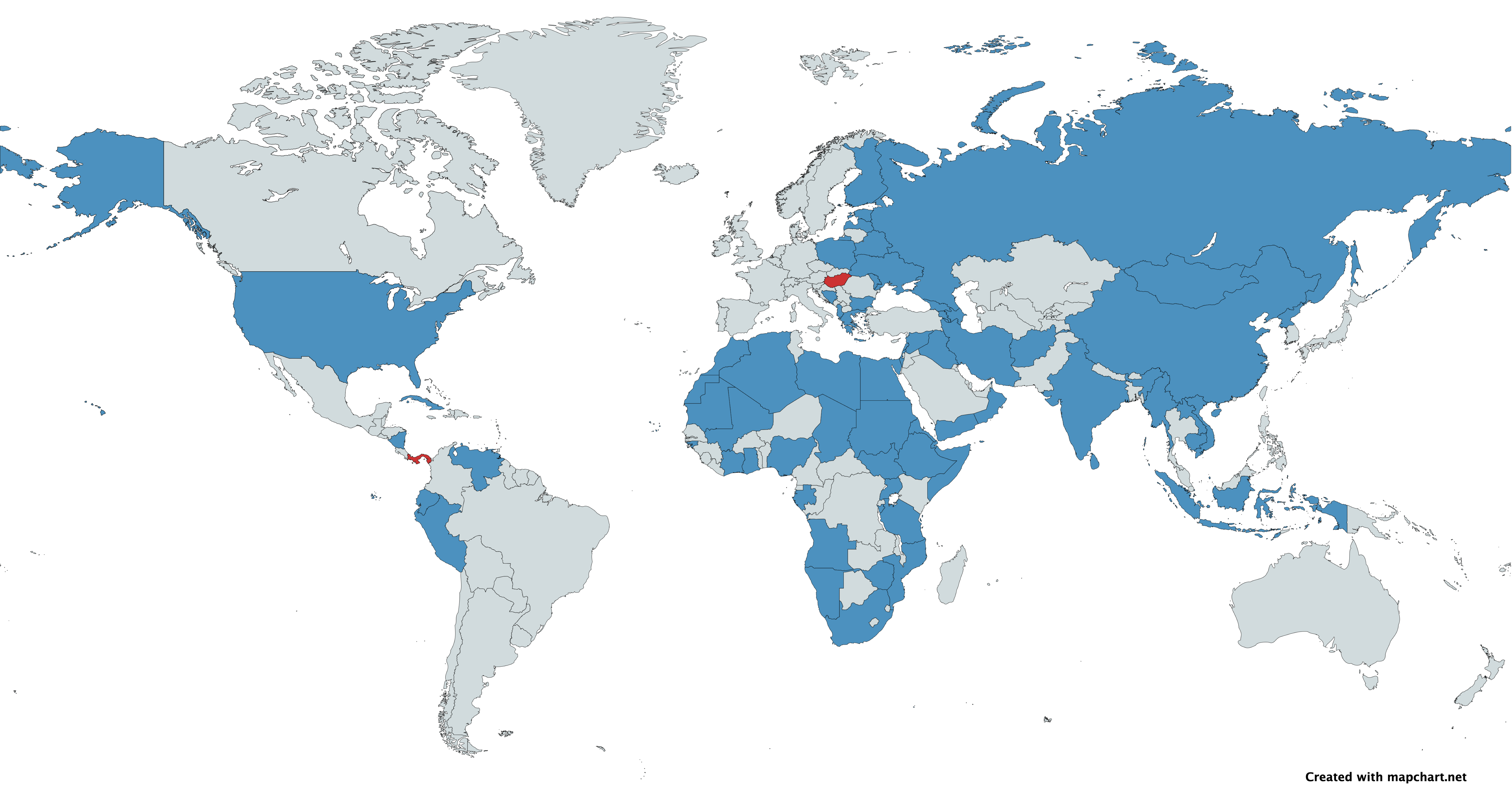
A map with users of the ZU-23-2 in blue and former users in red

- Afghanistan
- Albania
- Algeria – 100
- Angola
- Armenia
- Azerbaijan
- Belarus – 128
- Bosnia-Herzegovina – 29
- Bulgaria
- Burundi
- Cambodia
- Cape Verde – 12
- Chad
- Cuba
- Djibouti – 5
- Egypt – 220 ZU-23-2 and more than 81 self-propelled Sinai-23.
- Eritrea
- Estonia – 198, some mounted on MAN 4520 6x6 trucks.
- Ethiopia
- Finland – 1,100
- Gabon – 24
- Greece - 503
- Georgia – About 200, 40 mounted on MT-LB, some on ZIL-131 trucks and navy vessels. Applied to RWS.
  - South Ossetia
- Ghana – 4
- Guinea-Bissau – 18
- India – 320 towed and more truck-mounted.
- Indonesia – 4 system ZUR-23-kg-I as part of the "Kobra" AD system for the TNI-AD + 18 Giant Bow twin 23 mm gun as part of the Giant Bow II AD system for the TNI-AD
- Iran - 1000 supplied from 1967 to 1970. 300.
- Iraq
  - Kurdistan Region
- Israel - 150, Captured from Arab Armies over the Arab-Israeli Conflict.
- Ivory Coast
- North Korea
- Laos
- Latvia – 3 ZU-23-2MR Wróbel II on Imanta and Viesturs ships.
- Lebanon – 57, some mounted on M113 APCs
- Libya – Most mounted on light vehicles.
- Mauritania – 20
- Morocco – 75-90
- Moldova – 28, some mounted on BTR-D
  - Transnistria
- Mali
- Mongolia
- Mozambique – 120
- Nicaragua – 18
- Nigeria
- Oman - 4
- Peru – 80
- Poland – 252 ZU-23 and 72 ZUR-23-2 series.
- Russia
- Sahrawi Arab Democratic Republic
- Somalia
  - Puntland
  - Somaliland
- South Sudan
- Sudan
  - Sudan People's Liberation Movement-North
- Sri Lanka
- Syria
  - People's Defense Units (YPG)
  - Syrian opposition
- Tanzania – 40
- Turkmenistan
- Uganda – 5
- Ukraine
- United States – Testing only.
- Venezuela – ~200
- Vietnam
- Yemen – 200
- Zimbabwe – 45

=== Non-state operators ===
- Boko Haram
- National Guard (Suwayda)
- Tigray Defense Forces

=== Former operators ===
- East Germany
- Grenada – 12
- Hungary
- Islamic State
- Liberation Tigers of Tamil Eelam
- Panama
- Rhodesia – 12 were captured from Soviet-supplied militants during the Rhodesian Bush War.
- Soviet Union – Passed on to successor states.

== See also ==
- List of Russian weaponry
- Zastava M55
- ZPU
