= 358 missile =

358 Missile SA-67
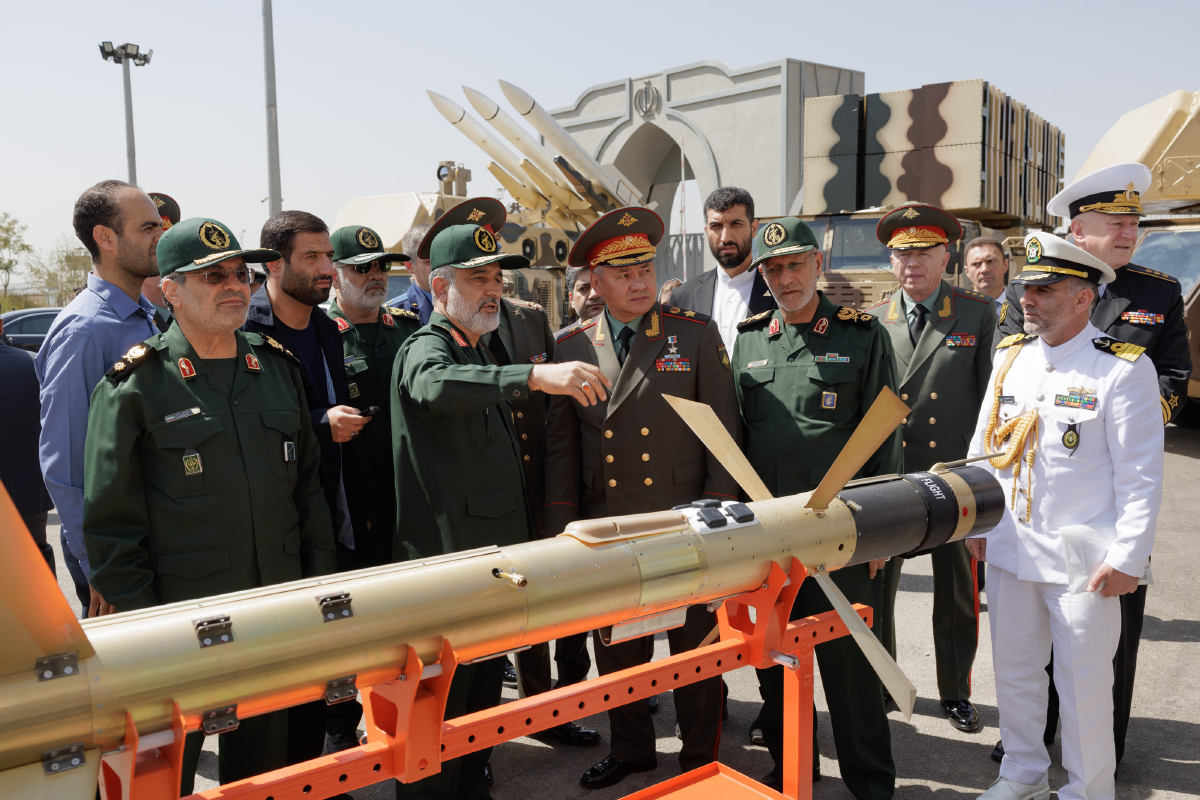
- 358 missile
- Type: Surface-to-air missile
- Place of origin: Iran (alleged)

Service history
- In service: 2019-present
- Used by: Houthis, Hezbollah, Islamic Resistance in Iraq, Islamic Revolutionary Guard Corps

Production history
- Designed: Unknown
- Manufacturer: Unknown / Iran (allegedly)

Specifications
- Engine: solid rocket booster, turbojet (cruise)
- Guidance system: Imaging infrared seeker or Optical

The 358 missile, also known as the SA-67, is a surface-to-air missile developed by Iran. These missiles have been intercepted in arms shipments intended for Houthi forces, in violation of the UNSC arms embargo (United Nations Security Council Resolution 2216) imposed on Yemen since 2015.

== History ==
The first publicly known examples of the 358 missile were identified in a seizure on November 25, 2019, by the US Navy in the Gulf of Aden. The vessel the Al-Raheeb was intercepted by the USS Forrest Sherman, which found two 358 missiles on board. A subsequent intercept on February 9, 2020, of the dhow Al Qanas 1 by the USS Normandy uncovered three additional missiles among the items seized.

A fully assembled 358 missile was found in Iraq on October 21, 2021, by the 52nd Brigade of Iraq's Popular Mobilization Forces (PMF) near Tuz Khormatu military airfield, in a hamlet called Albu Sabah. It was reportedly interpreted as a possible warning or threat to US forces in the area.

Another shipment of 358 missile were seized by HMS Montrose, a Type 23 frigate of the Royal Navy, on January 28, 2022.

On 7 January 2025 the IRGC-ASF tested 358 missiles, along with Tor M1 and other air defense systems.

== Design ==
The 358 missile has some limited loitering capabilities against drones and helicopters, but performs poorly and is of limited use against high-flying, fast-moving aircraft. Although classified as a surface-to-air missile, at least one 358 has been used in a surface-to-surface capacity in an assassination attempt against a provincial leader of the pro-secessionist Southern Transitional Council (STC) in Shabwah Province, Yemen. According to a UN Panel of Experts, it was determined that a significant amount of components were commercially available and acquired off the shelf through a series of shell companies. The main engine was a Titan AMT gas turbine by AMT Netherlands, while an Inertial Sensor Module MTi-100 was identified to be from Xsens Technologies.
