= Talaash air defense system =

Talaash
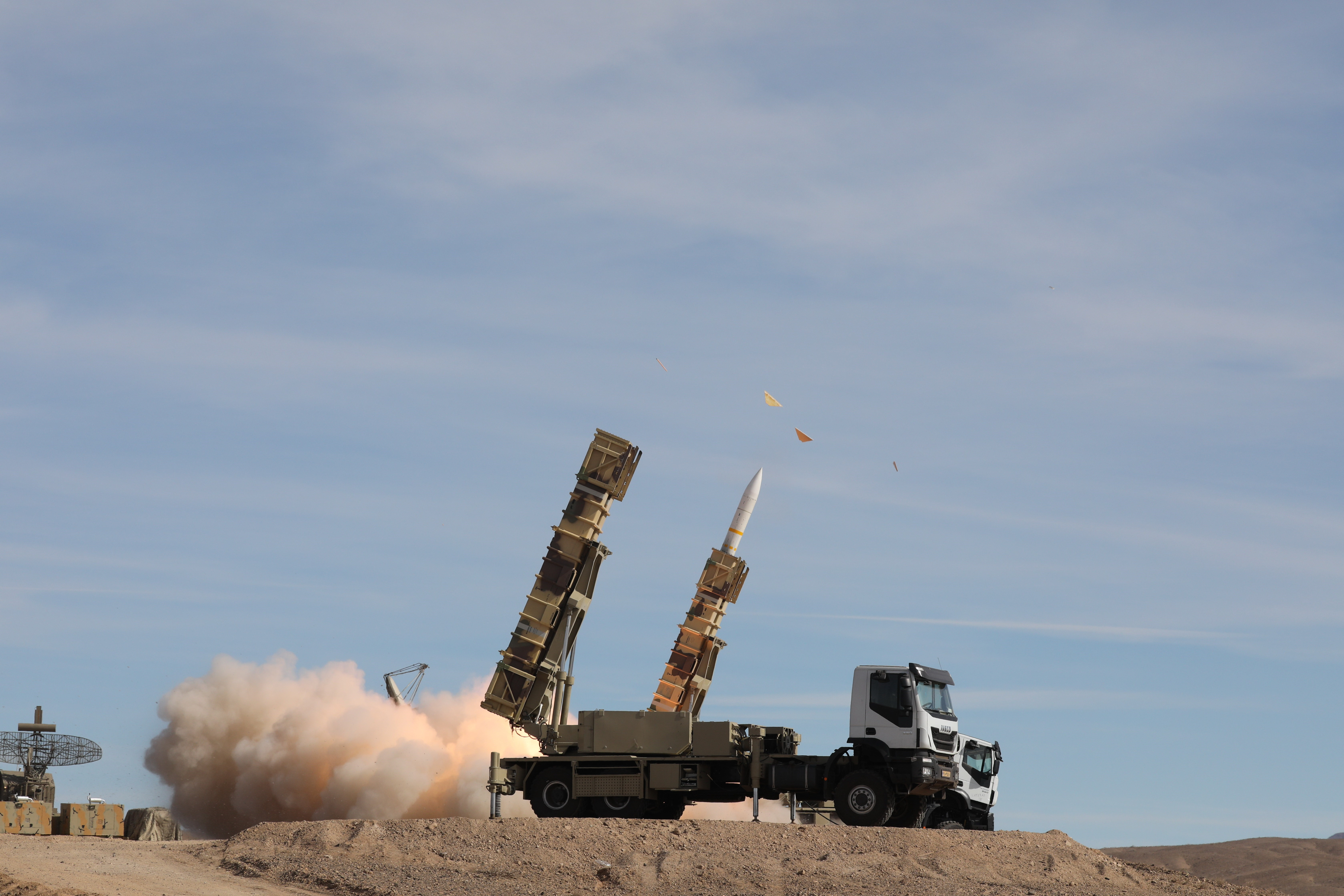
- Sayyad-2 launcher of Talash air defense system
- Type: Long-range Surface-to-air missile system
- Place of origin: Iran

Service history
- In service: 2017-present
- Used by: Iran

Production history
- Designer: Iran Defense Ministry
- Designed: 2013
- No. built: 41-42

Specifications
- Main armament: Sayyad-3, Sayyad-2 surface-to-air missiles

The Talaash (Persian for "Endeavor") is an Iranian long-range mobile surface-to-air missile (SAM) system unveiled in November 2013.

== Design ==
It is designed to fire the Sayyad-2 missile, but may also be used to fire the Sayyad-3. The Talaash system uses a Hafez 3D phased array fire-control radar.

== See also ==
- Sayyad-4 (missile)
