= Zoubin (defense system) =

Zoubin defense system (سامانه پدافندی زوبین)
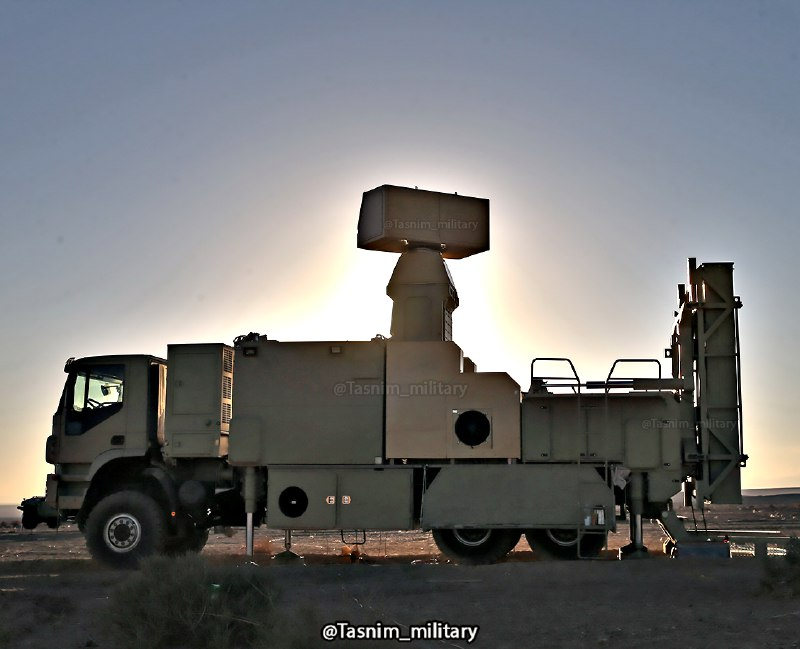
- Type: Short-range defense system
- Place of origin: Iran

Production history
- Manufacturer: Iran
- Unit cost: Not Mentioned
- Produced: 2021 (Unveiled date)

Zubin (also, The Zoubin short-range defense system) was unveiled in 2021 and is the ground-based version of the Navab system. This Iranian system is believed to be derived from the Umkhonto system and it consists of a 360-degree radar, a defense missile, and a command center. The radar has a detection range of 30 kilometers and an engagement range of 20 km and can detect 100 targets and engage 8 targets simultaneously. The Zubin system can counter a variety of cruise missiles, drones, low-altitude enemy fighters, and long-range munitions.

== Specifications ==
Zoubin defense system is installed on a trailer and therefore has high mobility. The harpoon control room is also installed below it and has a superior feature in terms of operation compared to similar models. The Zoubin short-range defense system has been specifically engineered and produced to address various threats, including cruise missiles, suicide drones, different forms of surveillance and combat drones, low-altitude fighter aircraft, and long-range munitions. Images released of this defense system reveal four vertical box-shaped launchers. Since the Zoubin system is capable of engaging eight targets simultaneously, it is equipped with an equivalent number of missiles.

The vertical missile technology utilized in this system has been developed and implemented by Iranian experts following the advancements made in the "Bavar 373" long-range defense system. The Navab system, which represents the naval variant of the Zoubin system, is intended for installation on Iranian destroyers and employs the same launching mechanism. This configuration allows for the deployment of multiple anti-aircraft missiles on a warship, contingent upon the vertical mounting of the launchers. Considering the dimensions of the launchers associated with the Zoubin defense system, it is evident that they have been specifically designed for the deployment of smaller missiles. These compact launcher systems have facilitated the transportation and launching of missiles via tactical vehicles, medium trailers, and smaller vessels in recent years.
