= Herz-9 =

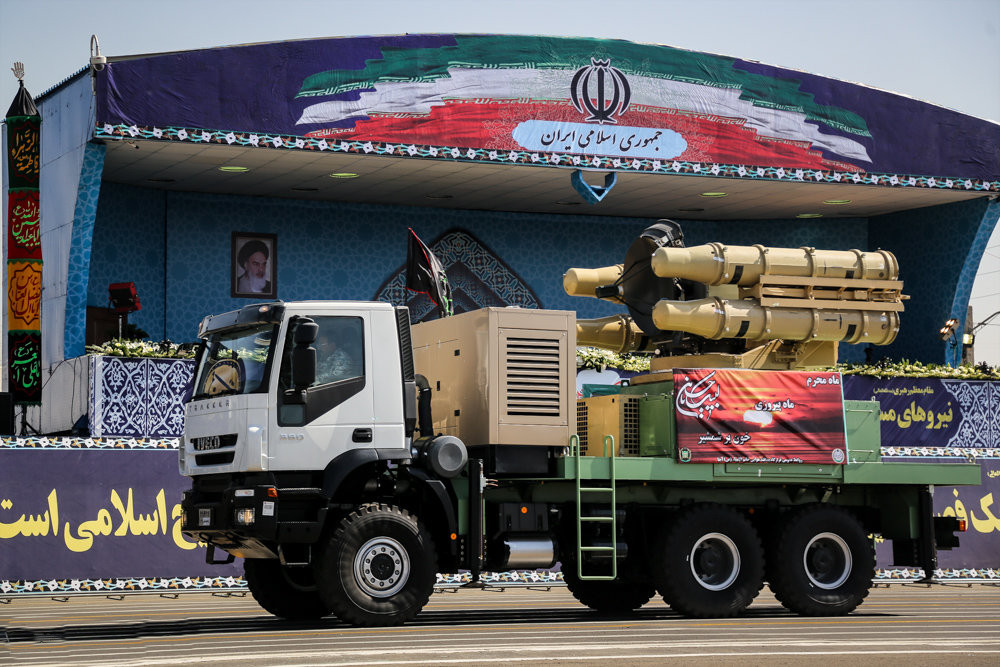
- Herz-9 at parade 2017
- Type: Air defense system
- Place of origin: Iran

Service history
- In service: May 2013–present
- Used by: Iran

Production history
- Designed: 2013
- Manufacturer: MODAFL IRGC AF
- Produced: May 2013

Specifications
- Mass: 85 kg
- Length: 2.93 m
- Engine: solid rocket
- Operational range: 8–12 kilometres (5.0–7.5 mi)

Herz-9 (Persian: حرز نهم) is an Iranian, domestically built, mobile air defense system developed and unveiled in 2013. The system is developed from the HQ-7.

== Development ==
In May 2013, the Ministry of Defense of the Islamic Republic of Iran announced the launched of the mass production of a new air defense system called Herz-9.

== Description ==
According to Iran's Defense Minister, Brigadier General Ahmad Vahidi, the Herz-9 system is capable of identifying and engaging enemy helicopters, rockets, and fighter aircraft at low altitudes and within a range of approximately 8 to 12 kilometers. Vahidi stated that the system is mobile and incorporates advanced computer hardware, software, and navigation technologies currently in use by Iran's Defense Ministry.
