= Iran Electronics Industries =

Iranian electronic equipment manufacturers

Iran Electronics Industries Persian: صنایع الکترونیک ایران Sanāye'-e Elekteronik-e Irān
- Type: State-owned
- Industry: Defense, Electronics
- Founded: 1972; 54 years ago
- Headquarters: Tehran, Iran
- Area served: Iran
- Products: Electronic systems and products
- Owner: Islamic Republic of Iran
- Number of employees: 1600 (2005)
- Divisions: Shiraz Electronics Industries (SEI); Iran Communication Industries (IEI); Information Systems of Iran (ISI); Electronic Components Industries (ECI); Isfahan Optics Industries (IOI); Iran Electronic Research Center (IERC)
- Website: ieicorp.ir ieimil.ir

Iran Electronics Industries or Integrated Electronics Industries (IEI, Persian: صنایع الکترونیک ایران (Sanāye'-e Elekteronik-e Irān); also known as Persian: صاایران, Sāirān) is/was a state-owned subsidiary of Iran's Ministry of Defense. It is a diversified organization with operations in electronics, optics, electro-optics, medical equipment, communications, computer and semiconductors.

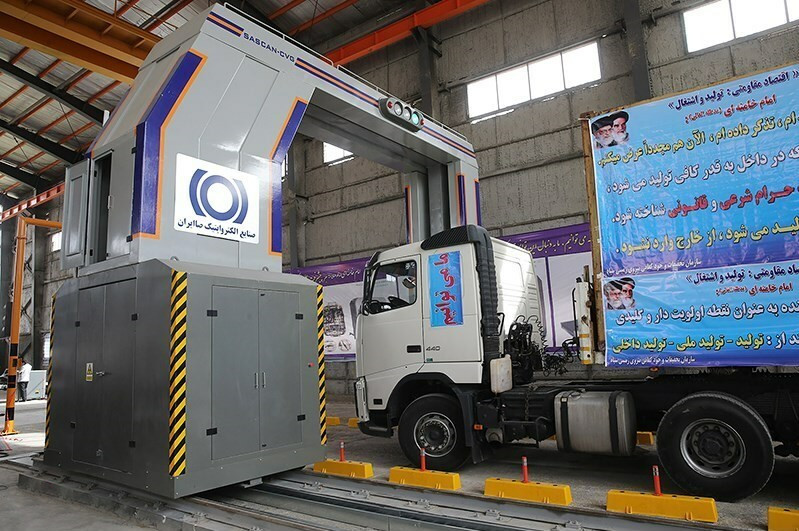
Vehicle and cargo container X-ray inspection system manufactured by ISFAHAN OPTICS INDUSTRIES (IOI), a subsidiary of Iran Electronics Industries (IEI).

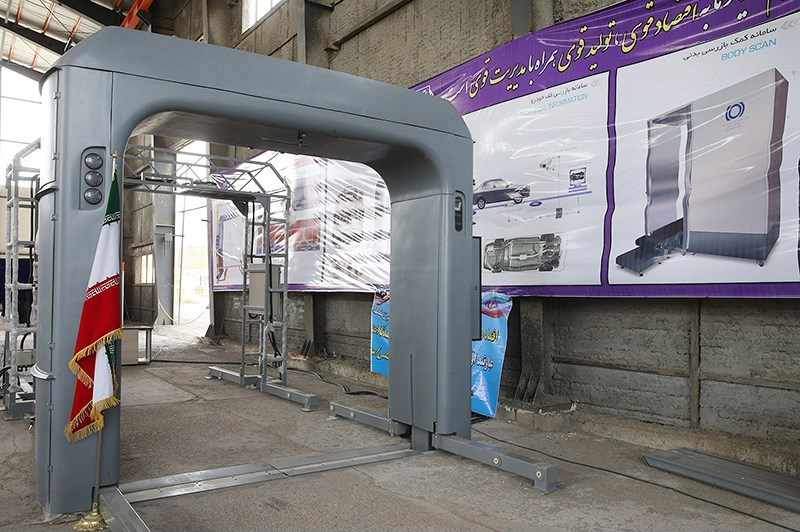
Car inspection system manufactured by ISFAHAN OPTICS INDUSTRIES (IOI), a subsidiary of Iran Electronics Industries (IEI).

== History ==
IEI was established as a government company in 1972 in order to develop military materials for the Imperial Iranian Armed Forces. IEI developed a high potential in research and development (R&D) which is the technological backbone of the company. IEI is an amalgamation of different manufacturing plants and companies in different parts of the country. During the reign of Shah Mohammed Reza Pahlavi, the company used the missile facility at Shiraz.

Following the Iranian Revolution and the outbreak of the Iran–Iraq War, Iran began to reorganize its industries to establish a war orientated manufacturing and research focus. IEI was a natural candidate to come under the supervision of the Defense Industries Organization, where it has remained since.The new generation of Iran's national reconnaissance satellites called Toloo (Rise) have been designed and produced by IEI in 2010.

The CEO of the company claimed in March 2025 that over 7,000 systems have been produced in different areas and delivered to the Iranian Armed Forces by IEI.

== Current status ==
It provides products and services for both the Iranian government and the public. IEI is considered as the largest electronic conglomerate in Iran. It is an ISO 9000 company. Its products meet international military standards.

=== 2026 Iran War ===
During the 2026 Iran war facilities of IEI were targeted by airstrikes to destroy the Iranian defense industry.

== Motto ==
The company's motto is "Forging Ahead Daily".

== Activities ==
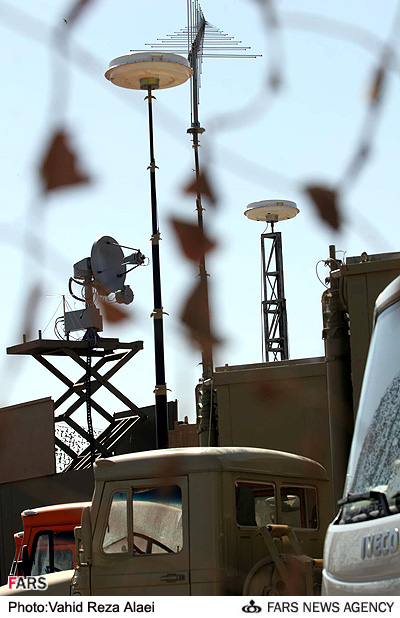
Military radar equipment manufactured by Iran Electronics Industries (IEI).

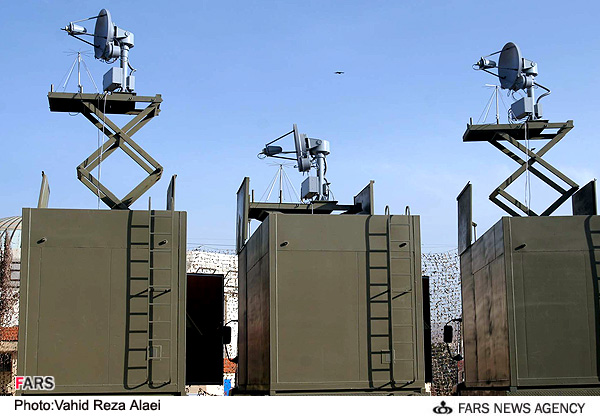
Point-to-point military information processors produced by Iran Electronics Industries (IEI).

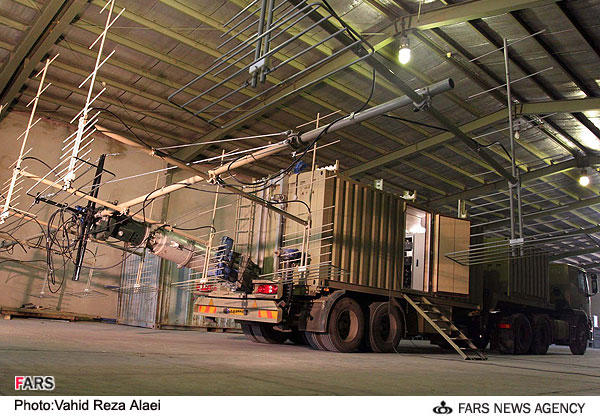
Military telecommunication monitoring equipment produced by Iran Electronics Industries (IEI).

The company currently maintains six subsidiaries which are each responsible for operational scopes in high-tech fields.

The subsidiaries and their respective industries are:

- SHIRAZ ELECTRONICS INDUSTRIES (SEI)
  - Electronic Warfare Industry
  - Avionics Industry
  - Radar & Microwave Industry
  - Naval Electronics Industry
  - Mechanical Parts Industry
  - Electro-Optics Industry
  - Engineering and Tech. Support Industry
  - Computer Peripheral Industry
  - Missile Electronics Industry
- IRAN COMMUNICATION INDUSTRIES (ICI)
  - Tactical Communication Industry
  - Communication Security Industry
  - Telecommunications Industry
  - Mechanical Parts Industry
  - Electronic Components Industry
- INFORMATION SYSTEMS OF IRAN (ISI)
  - Setting up of computer sites
  - Design and establishment of networks
  - Maintenance of main frames and minicomputers
  - LAN development and services (X.25)
  - Offering super data base (SUPRA)
  - Offering total solution projects (turn-key)
  - High-grade training programs
  - Software migration
  - Handling of grand scale projects
  - Consultation services
- ELECTRONIC COMPONENTS INDUSTRIES (ECI)
  - Semi-conductors (transistors & ICs)
  - Electronic credit cards
  - Multilayer, single & double sided PCBs
  - Hybrid circuits (thick films)
  - Quartz crystals & oscillators
  - High purity oxygen & nitrogen gases
  - Micromodules
  - Electronic ceramics
- ISFAHAN OPTICS INDUSTRIES (IOI)
  - Computer Aided Design of optical elements
  - Computer Aided Design of optical systems
  - Computer Aided Design of multilayer coatings
  - Production of different interference filters
  - Production of long range binoculars
  - Production of military periscopes for tanks
  - Design and manufacture of reticles
  - Advanced optical tests and measurements
  - Transparent conductive coating
  - Design and manufacture of optical sightsforguns
  - Analysis of optical systems
- IRAN ELECTRONIC RESEARCH CENTER (IERC)
  - Telecommunications products
  - Assembly of mobile handsets under the license of SAGEM Belgian branch company.

== See also ==
- International Rankings of Iran in Industry
- Iranian military industry
- Communications in Iran
- Iranian Space Agency
