= List of anti-aircraft weapons =

Military equipment list

List of anti-aircraft weapons. See also anti-aircraft warfare.

== Brazil ==
- MSA SHORAD system

== Canada ==
- Air Defense Anti-Tank System (ADATS)
- Oerlikon
- AMADS – Advanced man-portable air defence system

== Finland ==
- Leopard 2 platform whit Marksman
- SAKO 23 mm/87
- 23 ItK 95
- Nasams
- David Sling
- Stinger
- Igla
- Crotale
- Buk

== France ==
=== Current ===
==== Gun systems ====
- 20mm Tarasque
- VAB VDAA
- Panhard ERC 20 Kriss

==== Missile systems ====
- Aster / SAMP/T
- Crotale
- Mistral
- Roland
- Man-portable air-defense systems:
  - Mistral MANPADS
- Air-to-air missiles
  - MICA
  - Nord AA.20, AA.25
  - Meteor
  - AC 3G
  - Matra R.550 Magic

=== Former ===
==== Gun systems ====
- 25 mm Hotchkiss anti-aircraft gun
- AMX-13 DCA
- Canon de 37 mm Modèle 1925
- Canon de 75 modèle 1897
- Canon de 75 antiaérien mle 1913-1917
- Canon de 75 mm modèle 1924
- Canon de 75 CA modèle 1940 Schneider
- Canon de 90 mm Modèle 1926
- Hispano-Suiza HS.404

==== Missile systems ====
- Matra R.511
- Matra R.530
- Matra M.04

== Germany ==
- Flakpanzer Gepard
- LFK NG
- MANTIS
- Rheinmetall 20 mm Twin Anti-Aircraft Cannon
- Roland
- Wiesel 2 Light Air Defence System
- IRIS-T SL

== India ==
- Bofors 40 mm L/60 gun (anti-aircraft)
- ZSU-23-4 self- propelled AA gun
- 9K22 Tunguska
- 9K38 Igla
- 9K33 Osa
- S-125 Neva/Pechora
- SAMAR Air Defence System
- Akash
- Akash-NG
- VL-SRSAM
- SPYDER
- QRSAM
- Barak 1
- Barak 8(MR SAM)
- S-200
- S-300
- S-400
- Project Kusha

== Indonesia ==
=== Anti-aircraft Missile System ===
- RX-420

=== Self-propelled Anti-aircraft Gun ===
- Badak 6x6 SPAAG

=== MANPADS ===
- Rudal Merapi

== Iran ==
- Arman
- Azarakhsh
- ZU-23-1,2 23mm AAA
- Samavat 35mm AAA
- Sa'ir 100mm AAA
- Mesbah 1
- Sayyad 1,2
- Shahab Thagheb
- Mersad
- Misagh-1,2
- Mehran 1,2
- Majid (air defense system)
- Bavar 373
- 9 Day (defense system)
- Sevom Khordad
- 15 Khordad
- Tabas
- Raad
- Ya Zahra
- Soheil
- S-300 (missile)
- S-200 Angara/Vega/D
- MIM-23 Hawk

== Italy ==
- Aster / SAMP/T
- Scotti 20/L77
- Breda M1935 20/L53
- M1941 90/L53
- SIDAM 25
- Aster missiles
- Aspide missiles

Mlrs M270, multiple rocket launching system Sky Guard System automatic 35mm autocannon. Oto 76/62 cannon with Davide and Strales Guided munitions.

== Japan ==
=== Imperial Japanese Army and Navy Land Forces (Second World War) ===
==== Light anti-aircraft ====
- Type 98 20 mm AA machine cannon
- Type 2 20 mm AA machine cannon
- Type 2 20 mm twin AA machine (double cannon)
- Type 4 20 mm twin AA machine cannon (double cannon)
- Model 96 25 mm AT/AA gun
- AA mine discharger

==== Medium and heavy anti-aircraft ====
- Model 96 25 mm AT/AA gun (triple cannon)
- Vickers Type 40 mm AT/AA gun (double cannon)
- Type 11 75 mm AA gun
- Type 88 75 mm AA gun
- Type 4 75 mm AA gun
- Type 3 80 mm AA gun
- Type 99 88 mm AA gun
- Type 10 120 mm AA gun
- Type 14 10 cm AA gun
- Type 3 12 cm AA gun
- Type 5 15 cm AA gun
- 12.7 cm/40 Type 89 naval gun

==== Self-propelled AA ====
- Type 98 Ta-Se SPAAG
- Type 98 20 mm AAG tank
- 20 mm AA machine cannon carrier truck
- Type 98 20 mm AA half-track vehicle
- Type 96 AA gun prime mover

=== Japan Ground Self Defense Force anti-aircraft equipment ===
==== Anti-aircraft land fixed/mobile cannons ====
- M42 40 mm self-propelled anti-aircraft gun "Duster"
- Type 87 self-propelled anti-aircraft gun
- 75 mm M51 anti-aircraft gun

==== Surface-to-air missiles ====
- Type 81 surface-to-air missile
- Type 93 surface-to-air missile
- HAWK ground-to-air missile
- Type 3 Chū-SAM
- Type 91 surface-to-air missile

== Myanmar ==
=== Gun systems ===
- MAA-01 - 35mm AA guns
- 25 mm self-propelled twin AA guns - locally made 25mm AA guns which are fitted on the locally made Mil-truk

=== Missile systems ===
- MADV-1 - Self-propelled short range air defence system
- KS-1M - Medium-range air defence system

== North Korea ==
- S-25 Berkut
- SA-2
- SA-3
- SA-4
- SA-5 Gammon
- SA-6
- SA-7
- SA-17
- Pongae-5 (KN-06)
- Pyoljji-1-2
- 9K35 Strela-10

== Norway ==
- 7.5 cm L/45 M/16 anti aircraft gun
- NALLADS (using Bofors RBS-70 missiles)
- NASAMS - Norwegian Advanced Surface to Air Missile System (using AMRAAM missiles)

== Pakistan ==
- FIM-92 Stinger
- Hongnu-5
- M42 Duster
- Rheinmetall 20 mm Twin Anti-Aircraft Cannon
- HQ-16
- Aspide
- Anza (missile)
- Crotale (missile)
- RBS-70
- HQ-7
- LY-80
- HQ-9

== People's Republic of China ==
- Hongqi-1
- Hongqi-2
- Hongnu-5
- Hongqi-7
- Hongqi-9
- Hongqi-10
- Hongqi-15
- Hongqi-17
- Hongqi-18
- Hongqi-61
- Kaishan-1
- Lieying-60
- PenLung-9
- Qianwei-1
- Qianwei-2

Missile Systems

- S-400

Combined Systems

- QN-506

== Poland ==
=== Current ===
==== Gun systems ====
- ZU-23-2
- S-60MB
- KS-12
- KS-19
- Hibneryt

==== Missile systems ====
- 9K33 Osa
- 2K12 Kub
- S-125 Newa SC
- S-200 Wega C
- Poprad
- Man-portable air-defense systems:
  - Piorun
  - PZR Grom
  - Strzała-2

==== Combined systems ====
- ZUR-23-2S "Jod" and its variants, including PSR-A Pilica
- ZSU-23-4MP "Biała"

=== Former ===
==== Gun systems ====
- PKM-4 and PKM-2
- 20 mm Polsten
- ZSU-57-2
- ZSU-23-4

==== Missile systems ====
- PZA Loara
- 9K31 Strela-1
- 9K35 Strela-10
- 2K11 Krug
- S-75 Dźwina and modernized S-75M Wołchow (aka SA-2C)

== Romania ==
- CA-95
- Nike Hawk
- MIM-104C PAC-2 Patriot
- Flugabwehrkanonenpanzer Gepard
- CA-94
- 9K33 Osa
- 2K12 Kub
- ZU-2
- M 1980/88
- Oerlikon GDF
- AZP S-60
- MIM-23
- SA-2 Guideline
- ZSU-57-2

== Russia/USSR ==
=== Gun systems ===
- ZSU-37
- ZU-23-2
- ZSU-57-2
- S-60
- ZSU-23-4 Shilka
- 61-K
- 52-K
- ZPU
- KS-19

=== Missile systems ===
- Kashtan CIWS
- M-11 Shtorm
- S-25 Berkut

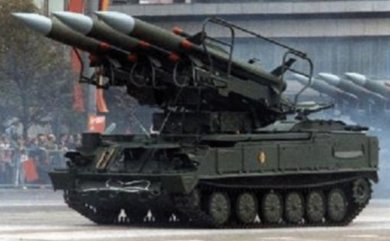
P25 TEL with SA-6 missiles erected

- S-75
- S-125
- S-200
- S-300
- S-350E
- S-400
- S-500
- Pantsir-S1
- 2K11 Krug
- 2K12 Kub
- 9K22 Tunguska
- 9K31 Strela-1
- 9K32 Strela-2
- 9K33 Osa
- 9K330 Tor
- 9K34 Strela-3
- 9K35 Strela-10
- 9K37 Buk
- 9K38 Igla

=== Combined systems ===
- Kashtan CIWS
- 9K22 Tunguska
- Pantsir-S1

== South Korea ==
=== Republic of Korea Air Defense Force anti-aircraft equipment ===
==== Anti-air missile ====
- NIKE-J ground-to-air large-sized missile
- PATRIOT ground-to-air missile

==== Anti-aircraft land cannon ====
- Rheinmetall 20 mm twin anti-aircraft canon
- VADS (Vulcan Ai) Republic
- Raytheon MIM-104 Patriot
- Raytheon MIM-23 Hawk
- MBDA Mistral
- Crotale NG#K-SAM Pegasus
- Chiron (missile)
- KM-SAM

== Sweden ==
- Bofors 20 mm gun
- Bofors 25 mm gun
- Bofors 40 mm L/60 gun
- Bofors 40 mm L/70 gun
- Bofors 57 mm L/60 gun
- Bofors 75 mm L/52 gun
- Bofors 75 mm L/60 gun
- Bofors 80 mm L/50 gun
- Bofors 105 mm L/50 gun
- RBS 70
- RBS 90 a twin mount version of the RBS-70
- RBS 23
- RBS 97 MIM-23 Hawk

== Switzerland ==
- Oerlikon 20 mm cannon
- Oerlikon 35 mm twin cannon
- Oerlikon Skyshield 35 mm Revolver Gun System
- Oerlikon Millennium 35 mm Naval Revolver Gun System
- Air Defense Anti-Tank System (ADATS)
- Skyshield

== Taiwan ==
- Antelope air defence system
- T-82T 20mm Twin Anti-Aircraft Cannon
- Sky Bow series of Advanced Surface to Air Missile System

== Thailand ==
- Air Defense Anti-Tank System (ADATS)

== Turkey ==
- Atılgan PMADS
- Zıpkın PMADS
- KORKUT
- HİSAR A+
- HİSAR O+
- SIPER
- S-400
- Sungur MANPAD

== Ukraine ==
- Raven

== United Arab Emirates ==
- MSA SHORAD system

== United Kingdom ==
=== Guns ===
- Vickers .50 machine gun
- 20 mm Polsten
- QF 2 pounder naval gun
- QF 3.7 inch AA gun
- 4.5 inch (114 mm) gun

=== Missile ===
- Bristol Bloodhound
- Blowpipe missile
- Javelin missile
- Rapier missile
- Sea Slug missile
- Sea Wolf missile
- Starstreak missile
- English Electric Thunderbird
- Sea Cat/Tiger Cat missile
- Sea Dart missile
- Sea Ceptor CAMM (missile family)
- Starburst surface-to-air missile

=== Other ===
- Holman Projector
- Unrotated Projectile
- Z battery (2 inch rocket battery)

== United States ==
=== Missile systems ===
- AIM-9X Sidewinder
- RIM-2 Terrier
- MIM-3 Nike-Ajax

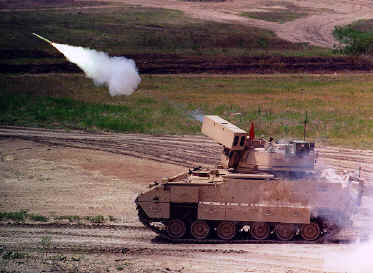
M6 linebacker launching Stinger missile

- RIM-8 Talos
- MIM-14 Nike-Hercules
- CIM-10 BOMARC
- MIM-23 Hawk
- RIM-24 Tartar
- FIM-43 Redeye
- MIM-46 Mauler (project)
- LIM-49 Nike Zeus (project)
- RIM-50 Typhon LR (project)
- RIM-55 Typhon MR (project)
- RIM-7 Sea Sparrow
- RIM-66 Standard Missile-1 and 2 MR
- RIM-67 Standard Missile-2 ER
- MIM-72 Chaparral
- RIM-85 (project)
- FIM-92 Stinger
- M-1097 Avenger
- RIM-101 (project)
- MIM-104 Patriot
- RIM-113 (project)
- MIM-115 Roland
- RIM-116 RAM
- RIM-156 Standard Missile-2ER Block IV
- RIM-161 Standard Missile-3
- RIM-162 ESSM
- LAV-AD

=== Gun systems ===
- 50 cal. MG
- M45 Quadmount
- Oerlikon 20 mm cannon
- 3"/23 caliber gun (World War I, interbellum, World War II)
- 3"/50 caliber gun (World War I, interbellum, World War II, Korean War, Cold War)
- 5"/25 caliber gun (interbellum, World War II)
- 5"/38 caliber gun (interbellum, World War II, Korean War, Cold War)
- 6"/47 Mark 16 and 17 gun (Cold War, Korean War)
- 75 mm Gun M1916 (World War I)
- 75 mm gun M1897 (World War I)
- 3-inch M1917 gun (World War I, interbellum, World War II)
- 3-inch M1918 gun (World War I, interbellum)
- 3-inch M3 gun (interbellum, World War II)
- 105 mm M3 gun (interbellum, limited production)
- 37 mm Gun M1 (some mountings added two .50 cal MGs) (interbellum, World War II)
- 1.1"/75 (28mm) gun (interbellum, World War II)
- Bofors 40 mm gun (World War II)
- 90 mm M3 gun (World War II – 1950s)
- 120 mm M1 gun (World War II – 1950s)
- Skysweeper (early Cold War)
- M42 Duster (Cold War)
- M163 VADS "Vulcan"
- XM246 (project)
- M247 Sergeant York (project)
- Phalanx CIWS

== Yugoslavia ==
- Zastava M55
- M-75
