= Type 5 15 cm AA gun =

Type 5 15 centimeter anti-aircraft gun
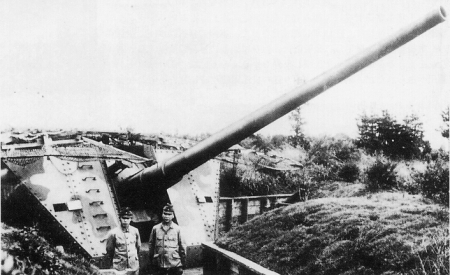
- Type 5 anti-aircraft gun
- Type: Anti-aircraft gun
- Place of origin: Japan

Service history
- In service: 1945
- Used by: Imperial Japanese Army
- Wars: World War II

Production history
- Designed: December 1943
- Produced: May 1945
- No. built: 2

Specifications
- Mass: 9.2 tons (gun only)
- Barrel length: 9 m (29 ft 6 in) L/60
- Caliber: 149.1 mm (5.87 in)
- Elevation: 8 to +85 degrees
- Traverse: 360 Degrees
- Rate of fire: 10 rpm
- Muzzle velocity: 930 m/s (3,100 ft/s)
- Effective firing range: 13.9 km (8.6 mi) against a target at 12 km (7.5 mi). Effective ceiling: 16,000 m (52,000 ft)
- Maximum firing range: 14.8 km (9.2 mi) against a target at 8 km (5.0 mi). Maximum ceiling: 19,000 m (62,000 ft)

The Type 5 15 cm anti-aircraft gun (五式十五糎高射砲, Go-shiki jyūgo-senchi Koshahō) was a large caliber anti-aircraft gun developed by the Imperial Japanese Army during the final days of World War II. The Type 5 number was designated for the year the gun was accepted, 2605 in the Japanese imperial year calendar, or 1945 in the Gregorian calendar. It was intended to replace the earlier Type 3 12 cm AA gun as a defense against American air raids on Japan.

== History and development ==
In order to address the shortcomings of the Type 88 75 mm AA gun, the Army Technical Bureau developed a larger version with superior range, designated the Type 3 12 cm AA gun. It was one of the few weapons in the Japanese inventory capable of reaching the USAAF Boeing B-29 Superfortress bombers that were attacking cities and other targets in the Japanese home islands. However, by late 1943 it became apparent that the B-29 was capable of flying at altitudes in excess of 10,000 m (33,000 ft).

An emergency project was initiated in December 1943, to address this issue. To save time, the existing Type 3 design was scaled up to 15 centimeters in caliber, with a corresponding increase in range and firepower. The project was completed relatively quickly, with test guns ready for firing 17 months after the project starting.

When it became apparent that the 12cm Type 3 gun had the reach to engage B-29s planned production of the 15cm was reduced to just 6 guns and no complete fire control was finished. In any event, only two of these were actually completed before the war ended, these being emplaced just west of Tokyo. Barrel life was estimated to be short, at about 300-400 rounds, but other than that the Japanese pronounced themselves satisfied with the weapon.

== Design ==
The Type 5 15 cm AA gun had a single piece gun barrel with sliding breech, mounted on a central pedestal. The guns were not mobile, requiring deployment in fixed positions.

== Combat service ==
Coming into service at the end of the war, the two Type 5s completed were retained on the home islands as part of the bolstering of Japan's defenses against Allied air raids and against the perceived threat of expected Allied invasion. The two guns were deployed to Kugayama, Suginami ward in the outskirts of Tokyo. In a single engagement on 1 August 1945, they brought down two B-29 Superfortress bombers. American bombing raids, however, avoided Kugayama after the incident and as a result the guns had no subsequent chance to fire.

=== Effectiveness ===
A postwar American report evaluated the effectiveness of Japanese anti-aircraft fire. The report demonstrated that the Type 5 15 cm AA gun was more than five times more effective than the Type 3 12 cm AA gun, and that the engagement envelope was considerably larger.

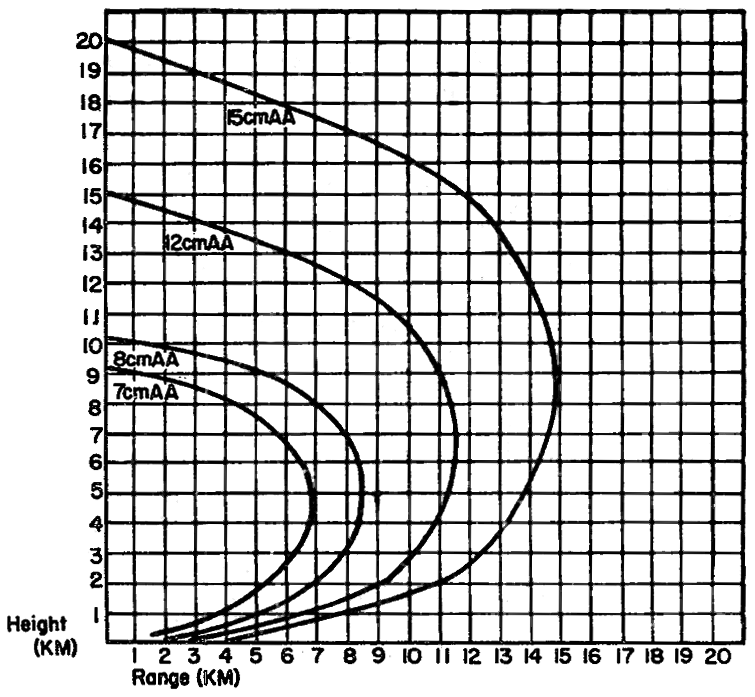
Graph showing the engagement envelope of the 15 cm gun compared with other Japanese anti-aircraft guns

The guns were deployed with a dedicated Type 2 electronic fire control system, with an above ground optical tracker and a targeting computer installed in a nearby bunker, this was linked electronically to the gun's fire control director, allowing precise target tracking.

Gun comparison
	7 cm AA	8 cm AA	12 cm AA	15 cm AA
Time to fire four shells	6 s	6 s	12 s	18 s
Burst radius	5 m	7 m	15 m	30 m
Burst volume	1 m^{3}	2.7 m^{3}	27 m^{3}	215 m^{3}
Shell weight	5.3 kg	7.4 kg	19.3 kg	41 kg
Ratio of volume rupture × rate of fire to 7 cm as baseline	1	2.7	13.5	71.6
