= 1st Antiaircraft Artillery Division (People's Republic of China) =

1st Anti-Aircraft Artillery Division (1950-1951)
- Active: 1950.3.12 - 1951.3.25
- Country: People's Republic of China
- Branch: People's Liberation Army
- Type: Division
- Role: Anti-Aircraft Artillery
- Garrison/HQ: Wuchang

The 1st Anti-Aircraft Artillery Division(Chinese: 高射炮第1师) was created on March 12, 1950, from 2nd Garrison Brigade of Henan Military District. The division HQ was set in Wuchang, Hubei province. The division was then composed of:

- 1st Anti-Aircraft Artillery Regiment, then stationed in Leizhou Peninsula, equipped with Japanese 75-mm AA guns;
- 2nd Anti-Aircraft Artillery Regiment, then stationed in Peking, equipped with Japanese 75-mm AA guns;
- 3rd Anti-Aircraft Artillery Regiment, then stationed in Changsha and Guangzhou, equipped with Japanese 75-mm AA guns;
- 9th Anti-Aircraft Artillery Regiment, then stationed in Shenyang, equipped with Soviet 85-mm and 37-mm AA guns;
- Radar Battalion.

From March 15 to 25, 1951, the division was utilized to organize the Air Defense Department, Central-South Military Region. The division was then disbanded.
