= Type 96 =

Type 96 may refer to:

- Type 96 tank, a main battle tank put into service by the People's Republic of China in 1997
- Type 096 submarine, a new type of submarine under development by the People's Republic of China
- Mitsubishi A5M, the Type 96 carrier-based fighter of the Imperial Japanese Navy
- Mitsubishi G3M, the Type 96 land-based attack aircraft of the Imperial Japanese Navy Air Service
- Howa Type 96, a 40 mm automatic grenade launcher used by the JSDF
- Type 96 armored personnel carrier, a wheeled armored personnel carrier used by the JSDF
- Type 96 120 mm self-propelled mortar, a tracked armored mortar carrier used by the JSDF
- Type 96 15 cm howitzer of the Imperial Japanese Army
- Type 96 150 mm infantry mortar of the Imperial Japanese Army
- Type 96 AA gun prime mover of the Imperial Japanese Army
- Type 96 light machine gun of the Imperial Japanese Army
- Type 96 mine of the Imperial Japanese Army
- Type 96 25 mm AT/AA gun of the Imperial Japanese Navy
