= Type 99 88 mm AA gun =

Japanese Type 99 88mm AA gun
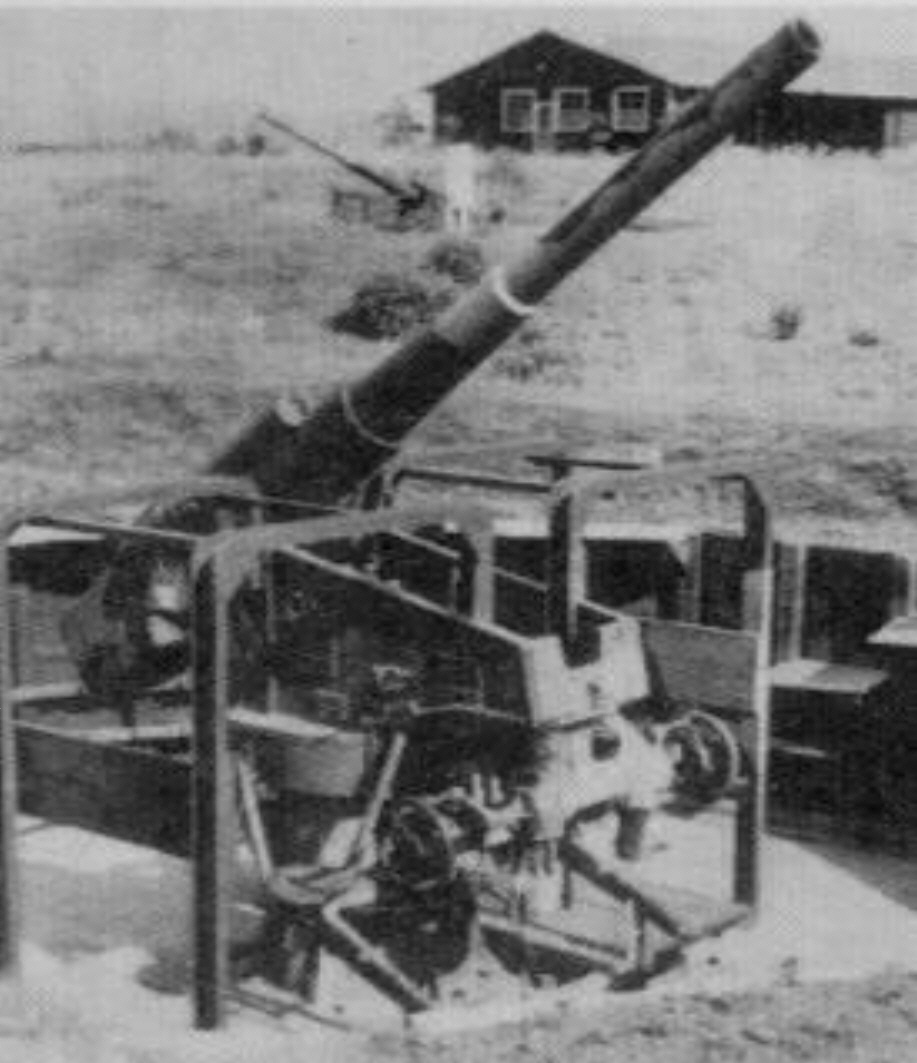
- Type 99 88 mm AA gun
- Type: Anti-aircraft gun
- Place of origin: Empire of Japan

Service history
- In service: 1939–1945 (to include captured Chinese SKC/30 units)
- Used by: Imperial Japanese Army
- Wars: World War II

Production history
- Produced: 1942-1945
- No. built: 946

Specifications
- Mass: 6.5 tons
- Barrel length: 3.959 m (12 ft 11.9 in), L/45
- Caliber: 88 millimetres (3.5 in)
- Barrels: single
- Elevation: -11° to +80°
- Traverse: 360°
- Rate of fire: 15 rounds per minute
- Muzzle velocity: 800 m/s (2,600 ft/s)
- Effective firing range: 10,420 m (34,190 ft)
- Maximum firing range: 15,700 m (51,500 ft)

The Type 99 88 mm AA gun (九九式八糎高射砲, Kyūkyū-shiki hassenchi Koshahō) was an anti-aircraft gun used by the Imperial Japanese Army during World War II. The Type 99's number was designated for the year the gun was accepted, 2599 in the Japanese imperial year calendar (1939 in the Gregorian calendar).

== History and development ==
During the Second Sino-Japanese War, Japanese forces captured a number of German-made SK C/30 anti-aircraft guns from the National Revolutionary Army of the Republic of China. These weapons were originally 88 mm SKC/30 naval dual-purpose guns for Germany's Kriegsmarine, and should not be confused with the more famous FlaK 88 mm anti-aircraft gun.

Realizing the superiority of this design in terms of range and firepower over the domestic Type 88 75 mm AA gun, the Japanese Army Technical Bureau quickly reverse engineered it and placed it into production when the Type 88 anti-aircraft gun began to show increasing obsolescence against modern military aircraft. Approximately 946 units were built.

== Design ==
The Type 99 88 mm AA gun had a mono-block gun barrel, semi-automatic vertical sliding breech block, and hydro-pneumatic recoil mechanism. The firing platform was supported by five legs, each of which (along with the central pedestal) had adjustable screwed foot for leveling. The gun barrel could easily be removed from the breech end-piece, and the entire assembly could be broken down into six separate assemblies for ease of transportation. It fired a 9 kilograms (20 lb) high explosive projectile to an effective altitude of 10,420 metres (34,190 ft). Armor-piercing shells were also developed for potential anti-tank use.

Projectiles

- High-explosive – 9 kg (19 lb 13 oz)
- Incendiary – 9.5 kg (20 lb 15 oz)
- Armor-piercing – 10 kg (22 lb 1 oz)

== Combat record ==
The Type 99 88 mm AA gun was primarily deployed in defense of the Japanese home islands against Allied air raids and against the perceived threat of Allied invasion.
