= SIRC =

SIRC may refer to:

- Security Intelligence Review Committee, an independent agency of the government of Canada empowered to oversee and review the operations of the Canadian Security Intelligence Service
- Styrene Information and Research Center, a not for profit organization whose membership represents approximately 95% of the North American styrene industry.
- Seafarers International Research Centre, a constituent Centre of the Cardiff University School of Social Sciences
- Sony Infrared Remote Control, a protocol for remote controls
- Social Issues Research Centre, an independent, non-profit organisation founded to conduct research on social and lifestyle issues
- Sydney International Regatta Centre, location of rowing event in Sydney 2000 Olympics
- Southern India Regional Council, of various organisations like ICAI, ICWAI etc.
- as SIRCS, the Shipboard Intermediate Range Combat System
