= 8.8 cm SK C/35 naval gun =

8.8 cm SK C/35
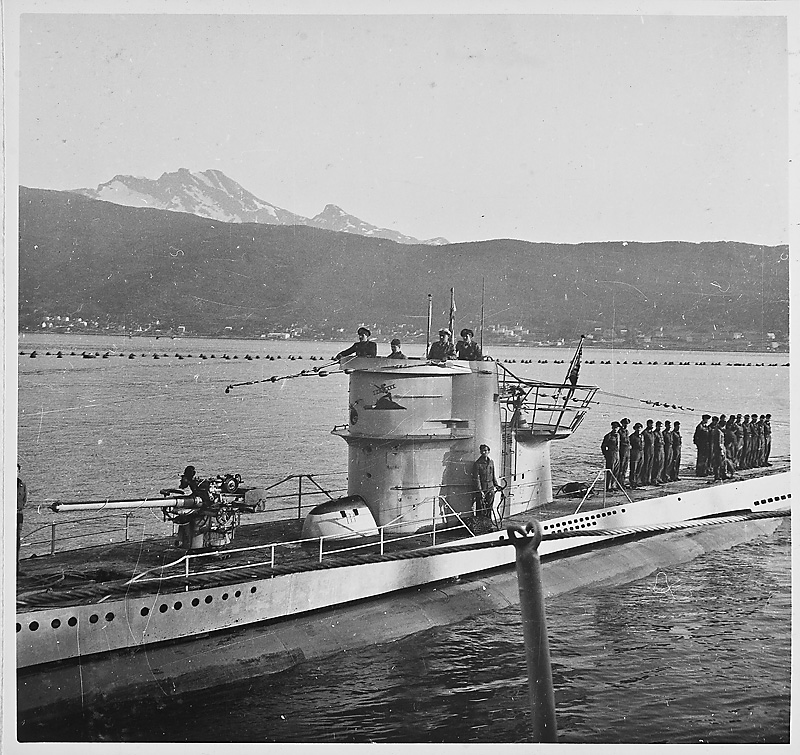
- A gun aboard U-251 in 1942
- Type: Naval gun
- Place of origin: Nazi Germany

Service history
- In service: 1939–1945
- Used by: Nazi Germany; Kingdom of Romania
- Wars: World War II

Production history
- Designed: 1935–1938

Specifications
- Mass: 776 kilograms (1,711 lb)
- Length: 3.985 meters (13 ft 0.9 in)
- Barrel length: 3.731 meters (12 ft 2.9 in) (bore length)
- Shell: Fixed Brass Casing: 15 kilograms (33 lb)
- Shell weight: 9–10.2 kilograms (20–22 lb)
- Caliber: 88 millimeters (3.5 in)
- Breech: vertical sliding-block
- Elevation: +30° to −10°
- Traverse: 360°
- Muzzle velocity: 700 m/s (2,300 ft/s)
- Maximum firing range: 11,950 metres (13,070 yd) at +30°

The 8.8 cm SK C/35 (Note: SK - Schnelladekanone (quick loading cannon); C - Construktionsjahr (year of design).) was a German naval gun used in World War II.

== Description ==
The 8.8 cm SK C/35 gun weighed 776 kilograms (1,711 lb) and had an overall length of 3.985 meters (13 ft 0.9 in) with a vertical sliding-block breech. The gun fired a 9.5 kg (21 lb) projectile 88 mm in diameter, and the barrel is sometimes described as 45 caliber. A 2.82 kg (6.2 lb) propellent charge produced muzzle velocity of 700 m/s (2,300 ft/s) with nose-fuzed high explosive and high explosive incendiary projectiles (with or without tracer). Useful life expectancy was 12,000 effective full charges (EFC) per barrel.

=== Ammunition ===
Ammunition was of a fixed type with a Complete Round Weight of 15 kg (33 lb) and a projectile length of around 355 mm (14.0 in). The gun was able to fire:

- Armor Piercing (AP) - 10.2 kg (22 lb)
- High Explosive (HE) - 9 kg (20 lb)
- Illumination (ILLUM) - 9.4 kg (21 lb)

The High Explosive (HE) round has a muzzle velocity of 700 m/s (2,300 ft/s).

== History ==
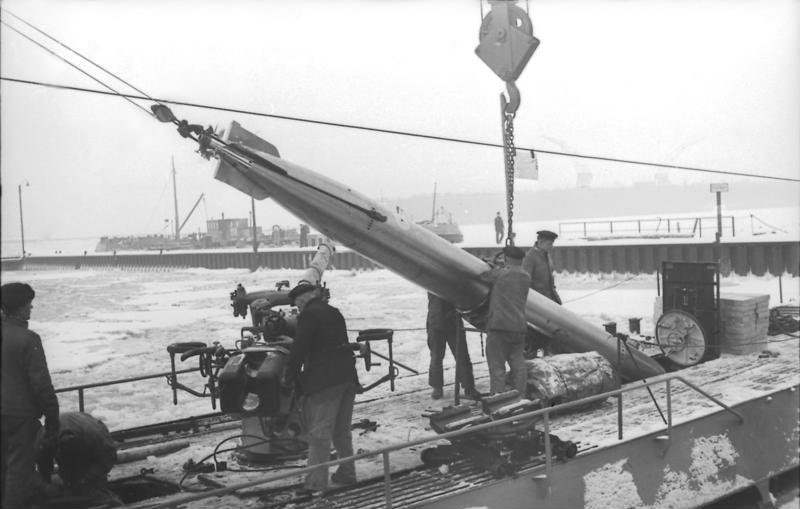
The typically unshielded SK C/35 deck gun of a type VII U-boat is visible below the torpedo tail.

=== Naval guns ===
This was the standard deck gun mounted forward of the conning tower in Type VII boats, although a few substituted a high-angle 8.8 cm SK C/30 naval gun for anti-aircraft defense. The SK C/35 was designed for the prototype VIIA boats of 1935 with a nominal ammunition allowance of 220 rounds. During the early war years, these guns were used to encourage surrender of independently routed merchant ships or to sink ships damaged by torpedoes. Some of these guns were later removed from U-boats for mounting aboard minesweepers and submarine chasers after unshielded deck guns proved impractical in action against Defensively Equipped Merchant Ships and escorted trade convoys.

== See also ==
- List of naval guns
