= Type (designation) =

Method of designating a version of a product

The word "type" followed by a number or letter is a common way to name a device or product in a production series, similar in meaning to "mark". "Type" (or similar translations) was used extensively by the Japanese and Chinese institutions (notably their militaries) beginning in the 1920s, and is still in use in both nations. The United Kingdom uses a type number system for much of their military equipment. Many other nations use the word "type" to designate products in a series.

== Japan ==
The Imperial Japanese Navy (IJN) and Army (IJA) began using Type-Number Systems in the early 1920s, to designate armaments accepted for production, and Type-Letter Systems for classes of armament.

The most common kanji character used to designate a "type" was "kata/gata" (型, type), but it was also often translated to class to follow Western naming conventions. For instance, the destroyer Fubuki was described as a "Fubuki-class destroyer" (吹雪型駆逐艦, Fubuki gata kuchikukan), but also a "Type I destroyer" (I型駆逐艦, I gata kuchikukan) (in roman numeral) and a "Special Type destroyer" (特型駆逐艦, Toku gata Kuchikukan).

The "letter" system mostly added standardized kanji for clarification, usually translated as follows: "A" (甲, Kō), "B" (乙, Otsu), "C" (丙, Hei), "D" (丁, Tei). For example, the Akizuki-class destroyers were designated as "Type B destroyers" (乙型駆逐艦, Otsu gata Kuchikukan).

The kanji character "shiki" (式) was often used to designate products in a series. The English language translation of shiki has been variously given as "model" or "type". Example, the "Type 3 shell" (三式弾, San-shiki-dan). Some manuals and texts have translated shiki as both "model" and "type" within the same publication, confusing the matter. World War II-era military dictionaries do not give shiki as the Japanese word for "model"—instead, the kanji character kata is given. "katashi" (形) is also translated as "form", "type", "pattern", "mark", or "model".

The IJN began using the Type-Number System in 1921. For armaments, such as aircraft, naval guns, and other military equipment, the numbers used were based on the number of years that the Emperor Taishō had reigned. Since his reign began in 1912, an aircraft ordered into production in 1921 would have been called "Type 10", the tenth year of the emperor's reign. At the end of 1926, the emperor died, leaving his son Hirohito as the Emperor Shōwa, and the numbering system was reset to mark the new emperor's reign.

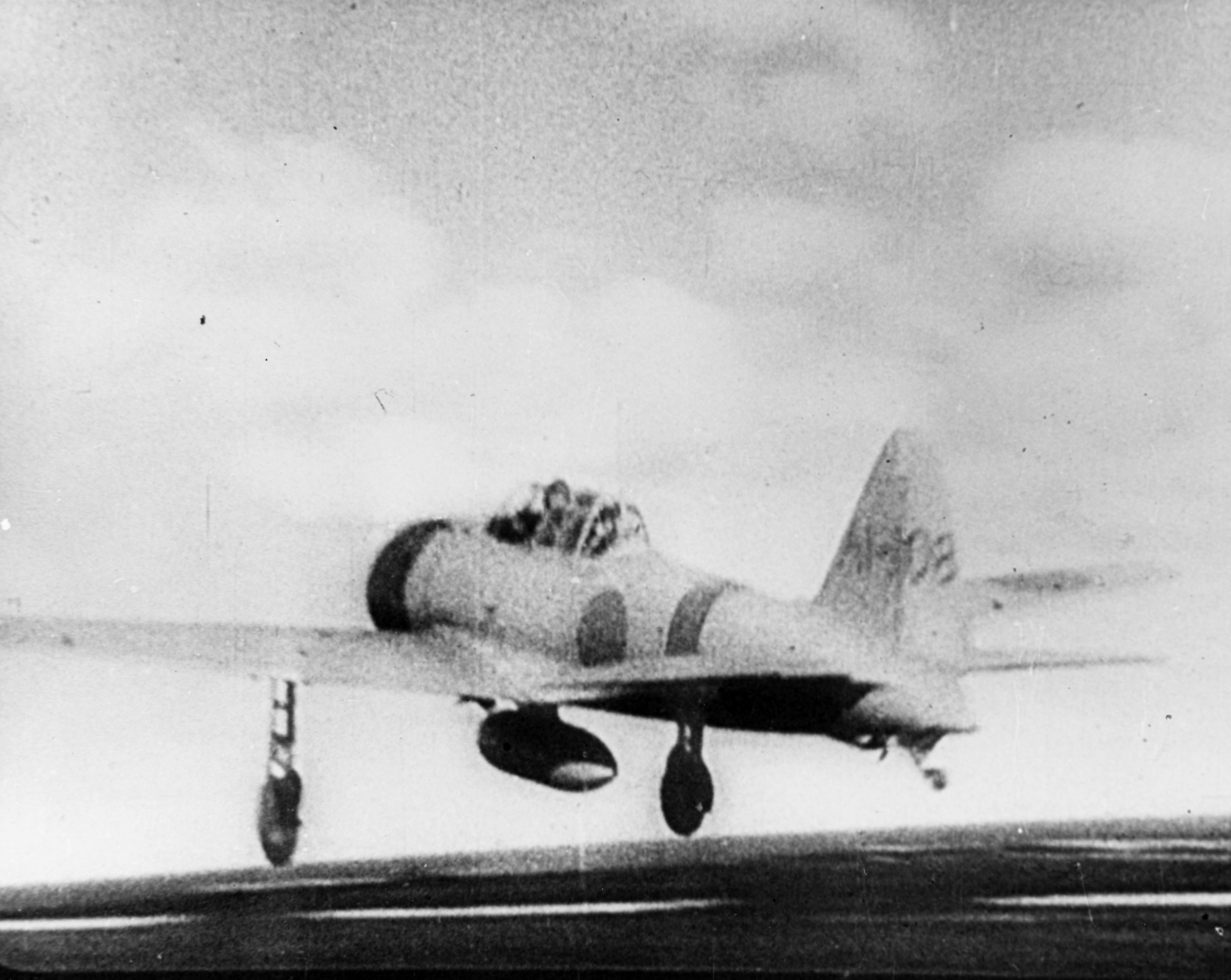
The Mitsubishi A6M Zero was ordered into production in 1940 as the Type 0 Carrier Fighter.

In 1929, the government of Japan adopted a new system based on the Japanese imperial year. Equipment ordered for production from 1929 onward were assigned the last two digits of the imperial year. Thus, an equipment ordered in 1929, aka the 2589th imperial year, would be designated "Type 89". As 1940 was the 2600th year, the IJN numbering system was reset to single digits, with equipment being designated 0 (zero) for that year. The well-known Mitsubishi A6M Zero was ordered into production in 1940 as the "Type 0 Carrier Fighter" (零式艦上戦闘機, Rei shiki Kanjō sentōki), and was popularly called the "Zero" because of its type.

In 1943, the designation system was abandoned by the IJN as it was considered too revealing about the nature of the armament. In its place, the armament were named with popular terms, such as "Kyōfū" (強風, Strong Wind) for the Kawanishi N1K introduced in 1943.

The kanji "Kai" (改) was also often used to designate an improved type/version/model, eventually followed by an additional number when multiple remodels were introduced, closer to the "mark" system. For instance, the Kawanishi N1K1-J was known as the "Shiden" (紫電), with the later N1K2-J being the "Shiden Kai" (紫電改), and further remodels adding a number (N1K3-J "Shiden Kai 1" (紫電改一), N1K3-A "Shiden Kai 2" (紫電改二), ...).

The IJA began using the Type designation system in 1927, for all weapons, vehicles, military equipment, subassemblies, and subsystems such as engines and gun mounts. In 1940, instead of resetting to zero, the IJA assigned "Type 100" to equipment put into production that year. In 1941, the IJA reset to "Type 1". Unlike the IJN, the IJA continued to use the system through 1945 with the production of the Kawasaki Ki-100 Army Type 5 Fighter.

Finally, some more unique pieces of hardware used custom designation, such as the various "Special Type" (特型, Toku gata), or more descriptive types, such as the I-201-class submarines (伊二百一型潜水艦, I-ni-hyaku-ichi-gata sensuikan) also known as the Sentaka-Dai type submarine (潜高大型潜水艦, Sen-Taka-Dai-gata sensuikan, "Submarine High speed-Large type").

After 1945, Japan's military changed to a numbering system based on the Japanese fiscal year, which begins on April 1 in the same manner as the British fiscal year. As an example, "Type 63" was the designation for equipment such as the Type 63 AT mine accepted in 1963.

== People's Republic of China ==
Chinese weapons and military vehicles are often, but not always, designated according to the Gregorian calendar, the one used by most nations. Two digits are used to designate the year. The two digits appear first, followed by the character shi, meaning "type". As examples, in 1956, the Type 56 assault rifle was put into production, and the Type 64 pistol was designed and approved in 1964.

== Republic of China (Taiwan) ==
The Republic of China military uses a type designation system for domestically produced small arms, light weapons, and gun based artillery. The designation of the weapon, instead of using the literal word "type", is marked with a "T" with a subsequent number corresponding to the Republic of China year (民國; Minguo) the design was finalized or had its prototype completed. As an example, the domestic Type 65 assault rifle (65式步槍) is designated T65 and had its design finalized in 1976 (Minguo year 65). The T75 squad automatic weapon, based on the FN Minimi, had its prototype completed in 1986 (Minguo year 75) and designated as such; but was continuously improved and until the design was finalized in 1992. For weapons that are copied or produced under license, the Minguo year of which it is ready for production is used; as in the case of the T57, a copy of the M14 rifle and the Type 24 Zhongzheng Rifle, a copy of the Mauser Standardmodell during the Second Sino Japanese War

== United Kingdom ==
The Royal Navy uses a type number system where blocks of numbers are reserved for specific purposes. For instance, the block 900–999 was given to naval radar sets beginning in 1945 and continuing for roughly 20 years. Numbers are not always sequential, as the Type 992 target indication radar was developed long before the Type 967 target designation radar. When a reserved block has been fully utilized, another is assigned.

== See also ==
- Type system of the Royal Navy
- Japanese military aircraft designation systems
- Joint Electronics Type Designation System, U.S. military system
- Mark (designation)
