= Type 3 12 cm AA gun =

Type 3 12 centimeter anti-aircraft gun
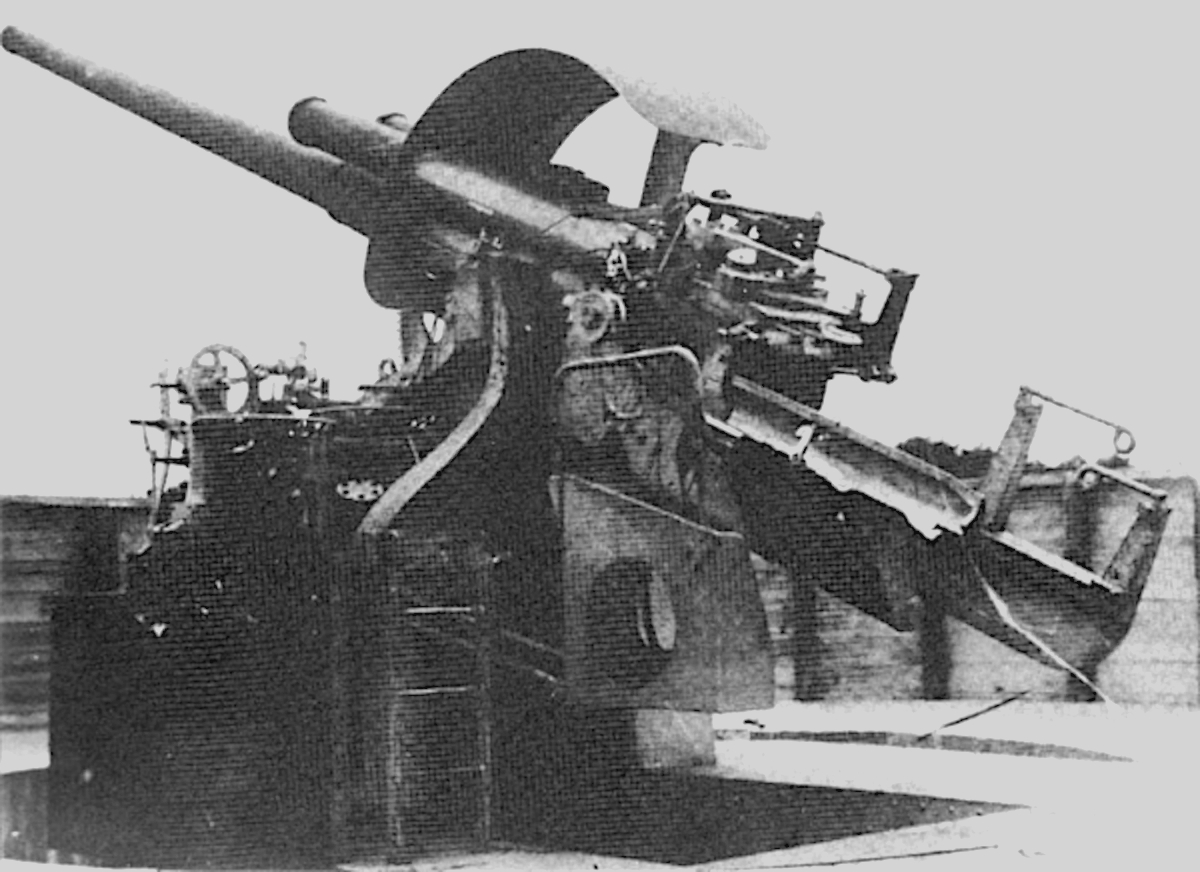
- A Japanese Type 3 anti-aircraft gun
- Type: Anti-aircraft gun
- Place of origin: Empire of Japan

Service history
- In service: 1943–1945
- Used by: Imperial Japanese Army
- Wars: World War II

Production history
- Produced: 1943-1945
- No. built: 157

Specifications
- Mass: 19.8 tons
- Barrel length: 6.71 m (20 ft) L/56
- Shell: 120 x 851mm .R
- Caliber: 120 millimetres (4.7 in)
- Barrels: single
- Elevation: 8 to +90 degrees
- Traverse: 360 degrees
- Rate of fire: 20 rpm
- Muzzle velocity: 853 m/s (2,800 ft/s)
- Effective firing range: 8.5 km against a target at 12,000 m. Effective ceiling: 12,000 m (39,000 ft)
- Maximum firing range: 11.4 km against a target at 6,000 m. Maximum ceiling: 20,000 m (66,000 ft)

The Type 3 12 cm AA gun (三式十二糎高射砲, San-shiki jyūni-senchi Kōshahō) was an anti-aircraft gun used in quantity by the Imperial Japanese Army during World War II.The Type 3 number was designated for the year the gun was accepted, 2603 in the Japanese imperial year calendar, or 1943 in the Gregorian calendar. It replaced the earlier Type 88 75 mm AA Gun in Japanese service. The 12cm Type 3, was the only IJA AA gun to enter regular service to have power controls and utilized a power ramming and semi-automated fuze setting on the loading tray similar to that of the Navy’s 10cm Type 98 gun. It was a modern weapon and was by far the best heavy AA gun of the Army, although employment was mostly limited to the home islands due to the use of heavy concrete mounts.

== History and development ==
In order to address the shortcomings of the Type 88 75 mm AA gun, the Army Technical Bureau developed a larger version with superior range, designated the Type 3. It was one of the few weapons in the Japanese inventory capable of reaching the USAAF B-29 Superfortress bombers that were attacking cities and other targets in the Japanese home islands. However, despite its superior range and firepower, the Type 3 gun could not be produced in sufficient quantities to be truly effective, due to costs, lack of raw materials and damage to Japan's industrial infrastructure by Allied air raids.

== Design ==
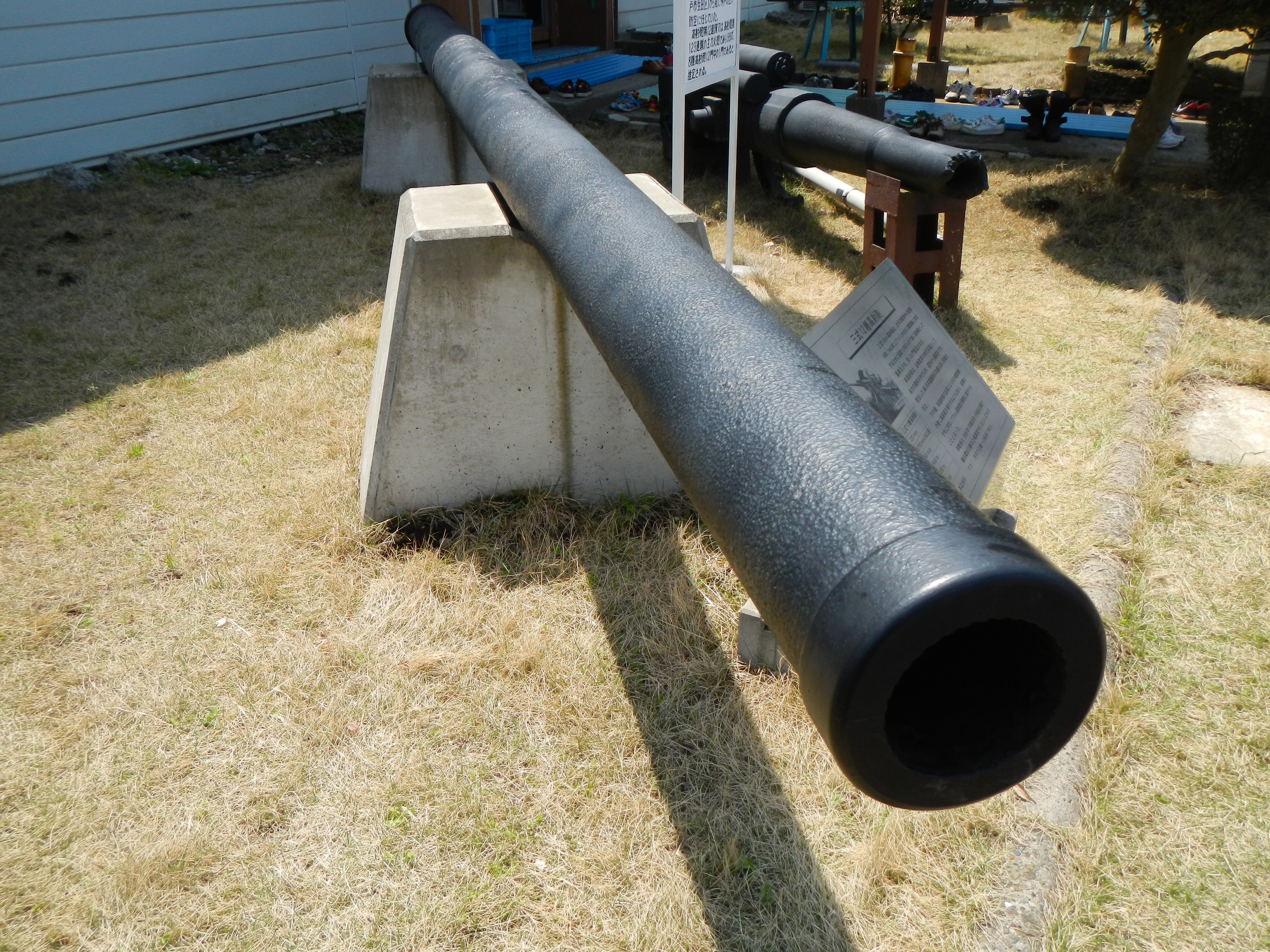
Gun barrel preserved at JGSDF Air Defence Artillery School, Chiba

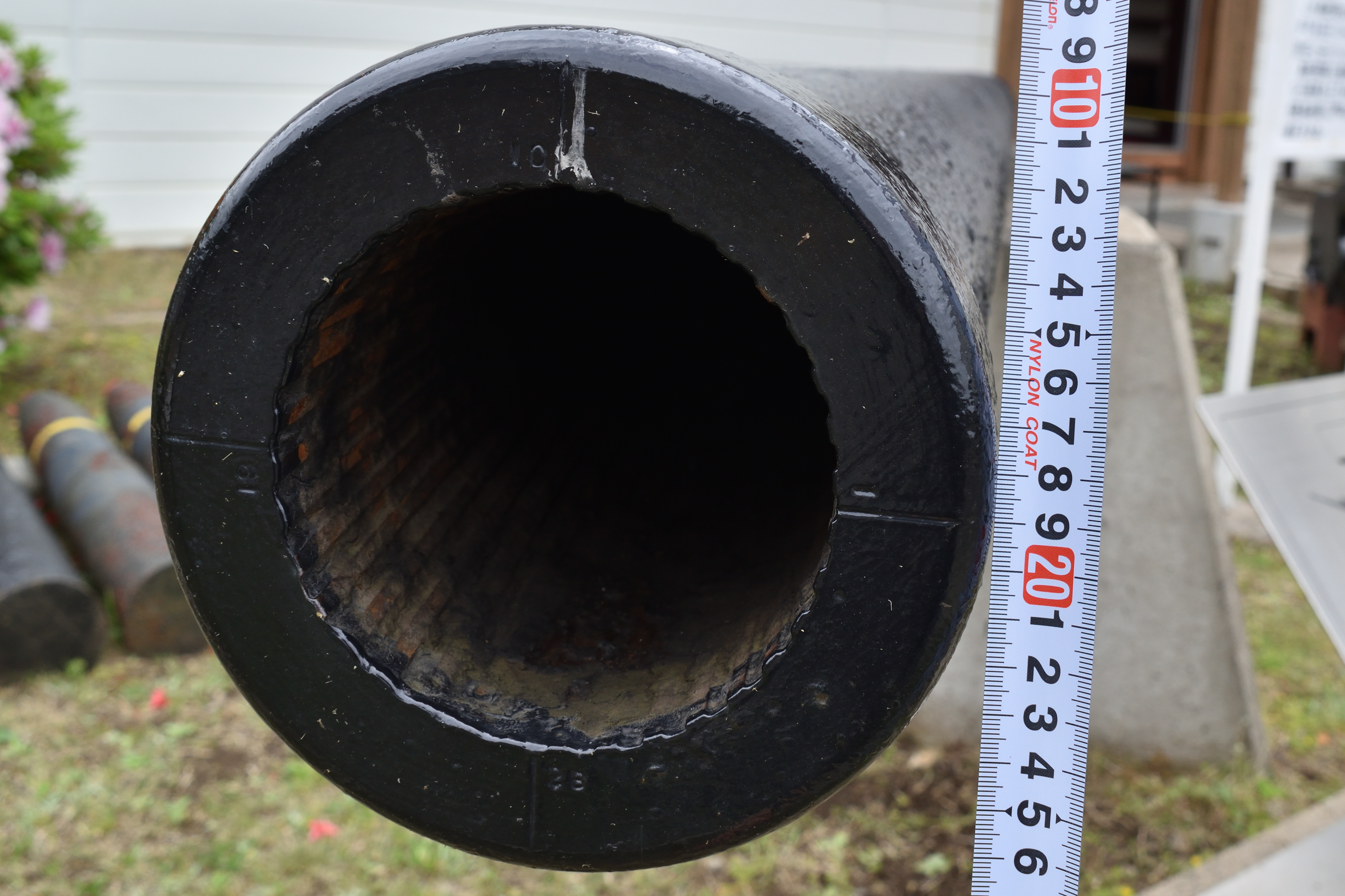
Gun muzzle

The Type 3 12 cm AA gun had a single piece gun barrel with sliding breech, mounted on a central pedestal. The firing platform was supported by five legs, each of which (along with the central pedestal) had adjustable screwed foot for leveling.

== Combat record ==
Coming into service towards the end of the war, most of the Type 3s were retained on the home islands as part of the bolstering of Japan's defenses against Allied air raids and against the perceived threat of an Allied invasion. These guns were deployed to cover military targets around Tokyo, Osaka, Kobe and the Yawata Steel Works in Kitakyushu. Overseas, they were deployed to guard the oil fields at Palembang in the Netherlands East Indies Units in Tokyo were credited with downing at least ten B-29 bombers.
