= Nord AA.20 =

AA.20
- AA.20 mounted on SNCASE Aquilon fighter
- Type: Air-to-air missile
- Place of origin: France

Service history
- In service: 1956–1960
- Used by: Armee de l'Air; Aeronavale

Production history
- Manufacturer: Nord Aviation
- No. built: 6,000

Specifications
- Mass: 134 kilograms (295 lb)
- Length: 2.6 metres (8 ft 6 in)
- Diameter: 0.25 metres (9.8 in)
- Wingspan: 0.8 metres (2 ft 7 in)
- Warhead: Blast-frag high explosive
- Warhead weight: 23 kilograms (51 lb)
- Engine: Solid-fuel rocket
- Operational range: 4 kilometres (2.5 mi)
- Guidance system: radio command guidance from launching aircraft
- Launch platform: Mystere IV; Super Mystere B2; Fiat G.91 R/4; Mirage IIIC; Sud Aviation Vautour

The AA.20 was a French air-to-air missile, developed by Nord Aviation, and was one of the first of such missiles adopted into service in Western Europe. Production began at Chatillon, France in 1956. Approximately 6,000 missiles of the type were produced, remaining in service until 1960.

== Development ==
The development of the AA.20 missile began in 1953, when the French government placed a contract with SFECMAS, subsequently merged into Nord Aviation. Developed alongside the SS.10 anti-tank missile, it was designated the Type 5103. The project's goals were simple; the AA.20 was always regarded as a stepping stone to a more advanced missile, which would materialise as the R.530.

== Description ==
The AA.20 was command guided, using a similar system to that used by Nord's anti-tank missiles, with the missile being steered visually from the launching aircraft. Angled, fixed wings imparted a steady roll rate, while a gyroscope provided information on the orientation of the missile to the control mechanism. At launch, a twin solid rocket booster fired to bring the missile up to speed, after which a single solid-fueled sustainer rocket maintained speed following burnout of the booster. Four interrupter blades, placed around the sustainer motor's nozzle, provided steering, while a flare mounted on the rear of the missile aided in visual tracking for guidance.

The AA.20's warhead was a 23-kilogram (51 lb) blast-fragmentation type, detonated by a proximity fuze set to trigger the warhead at a distance of 15 metres (49 ft) from the target. The range of the 134-kilogram (295 lb) missile was approximately 4 kilometres (2.5 mi). The command guidance of the AA.20 allowed for it to be used in a secondary role as an air-to-surface missile, although it also meant that the missile could not be used at night or in bad weather.

The overall shape of the missile was to be later used on a series of air-to-ground missiles (AS-20 then AS-30, which evolved into the AS-30L laser-guided variant (the first French laser-guided air-to-ground weapon).

== AA.25 ==
Aimed at addressing the major flaws of the AA.20, specifically the fact that the missile could not be used at night or in poor weather, the French developed the AA.25, which was essentially a radar-beam riding version of the AA.20, using the target-tracking beam of the CSF Cyrano Ibis radar fitted to the Mirage IIIC. Many AA.20 missiles were converted to AA.25 standard. A further version of the missile, designated the AA.26, with semi-active homing was planned but the competing R.511 missile was adopted instead.

== Bibliography ==
- Gunston, Bill (1979). The Illustrated Encyclopedia of the World's Rockets & Missiles. London: Salamander Books. ISBN 0-517-26870-1.
- Ordway, Frederick Ira; Ronald C. Wakeford (1960). International Missile and Spacecraft Guide. New York: McGraw-Hill. ASIN B000MAEGVC.
