= Type 63 AT mine =

Anti-tank mine

The Type 63 AT mine is a large circular Japanese minimum metal anti-tank blast mine. The mine does not float and is waterproof, enabling it to be used in shallow water. The mine uses a standard mechanical pressure fuze, with three ball bearings retaining a spring-loaded striker over a detonator assembly. The Type 63B variant has a secondary fuze well to attach an anti-handling device.

== Specifications ==
- Diameter: 305 mm
- Height: 216 mm
- Weight: 14.5 kg
- Explosive content: 11 kg of Composition B
- Operating pressure: 181 kg
