= R.511 =

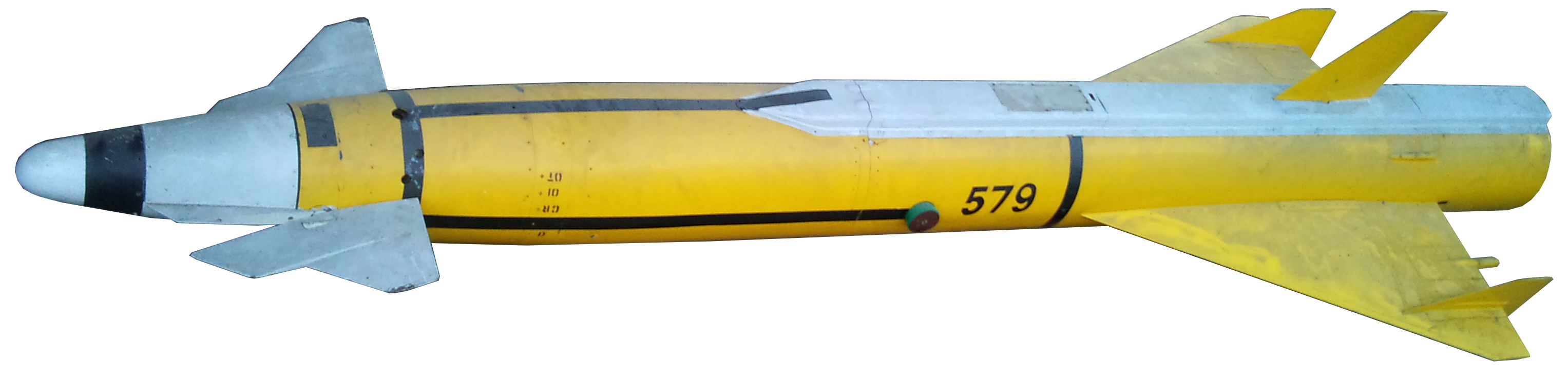
- Matra R511-1.
- Type: Air-to-air missile
- Place of origin: France

Service history
- In service: 1952–1976
- Used by: Armee de l'Air; Aeronavale

Production history
- Manufacturer: Matra
- No. built: 1,500

Specifications
- Mass: 184 kilograms (406 lb)
- Length: 3.09 metres (10.1 ft)
- Diameter: 0.26 metres (10 in)
- Wingspan: 1 metre (3 ft 3 in)
- Warhead: Blast-frag high explosive
- Warhead weight: 25 kilograms (55 lb)
- Engine: Hotchkiss-Brandt solid cast two stage motor 1,600 kg / 200 kg
- Operational range: 7 kilometres (4.3 mi)
- Flight ceiling: 18,000 metres (59,000 ft)
- Flight altitude: 3,000 metres (9,800 ft) to 18,000 metres (59,000 ft)
- Guidance system: Semi-active radar homing (R.511)
- Steering system: Twist and steer
- Launch platform: Sud Aviation Vautour IIN; Dassault Mirage IIIC

The R.511 was a French air-to-air missile, developed by Matra, based on their work with the Matra M.04 (R.042) and R.05. The first version of the missile, the R.510, was infra-red guided, and while accurate had very limited operating parameters. The missile was superseded by the far more capable R.530 in French service, although continued to be used in training units until 1976.

== Description ==
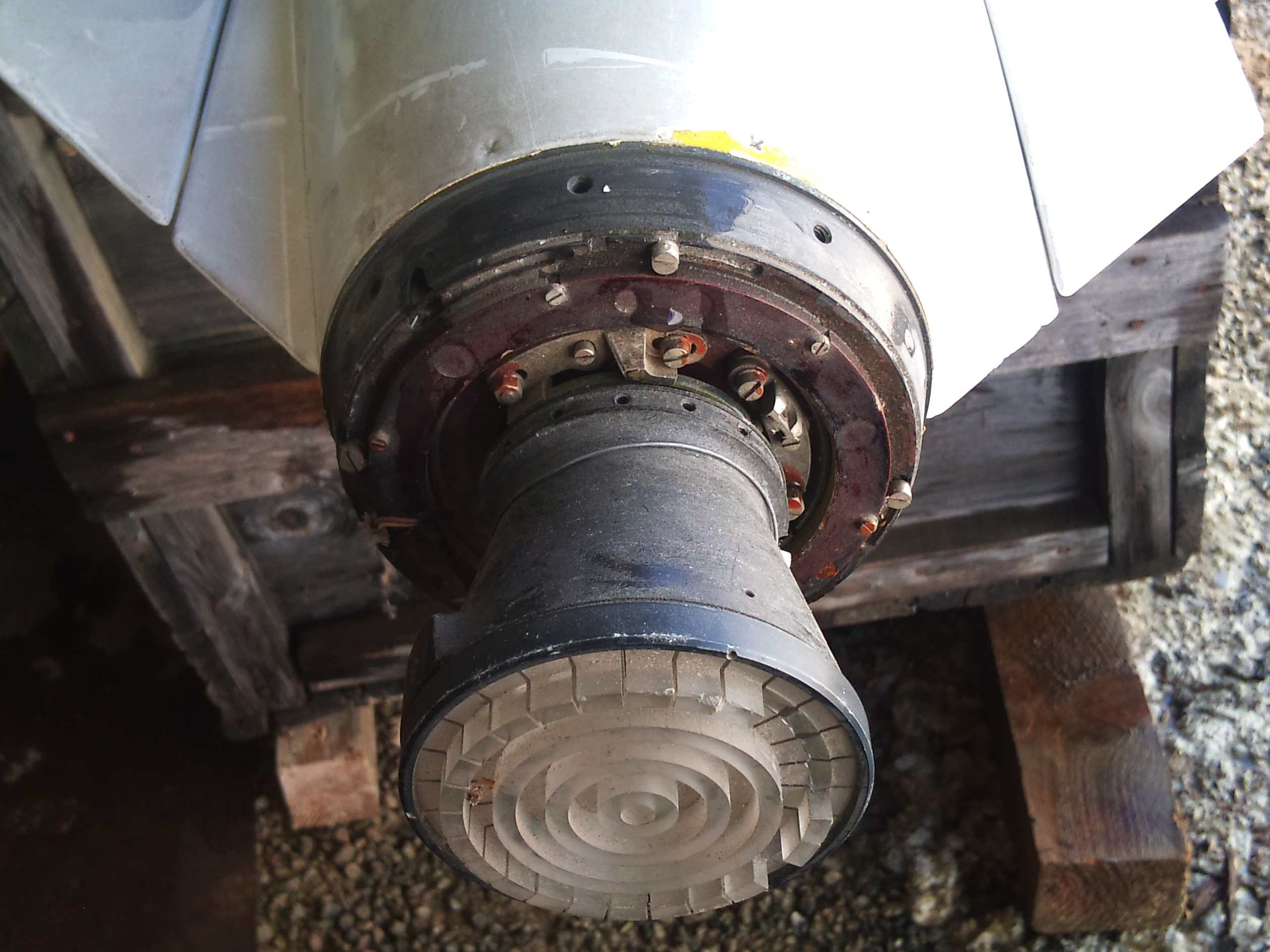
View of the radar homing head of the R511.

The R.510 was optically guided by a lead sulphide (PbS) infra-red photocell with a 20° field of view. Testing of the R.510 began at the CIEES missile range near Colomb-Béchar and Hammaguir, French Algeria, in October 1952, and a limited production run of 100 missiles was ordered. However the PbS seeker was insensitive and could only effectively track targets at night.

The R.511 entered service in 1957, replacing the R.510. The R.511 used a Thompson-CSF semi-active radar homing head which was tuned to home on to reflections of the launch aircraft's radar; its antenna scanned conically 8° off the boresight of the missile at a rate of 225 revolutions per second. For longer range firing, guidance commands were transmitted directly to the missile via an antenna on the trailing edge of the missile's wing. Limitations of the launch aircraft's radar restricted operation to above 3,000 m (9,800 ft).

The missile could pull 12g while travelling at Mach 1 at 10,000 m (33,000 ft).

== Variants ==
R.510
An infra-red homing missile with a PbS (lead sulphide) seeker head. The R.510 was produced in limited numbers for research only.
R.511
A passive radar guided missile, homing on to reflections of the launch aircraft's radar. The R.511 was used operationally on the Sud Aviation Vautour IIN and Dassault Mirage IIIC.
