= RIM-85 =

ZRIM-85A
- Type: Surface-to-air missile
- Place of origin: United States

Service history
- Used by: United States Navy

Production history
- Designed: 1968

RIM-85 was a short-lived project by the United States Navy to develop a surface-to-air missile for the defense of naval vessels. Developed during the late 1960s, the project was cancelled before the start of detailed design work.

== Development and cancellation ==
During the 1960s, the United States Navy identified a requirement for a new type of surface-to-air missile, capable of defending ships against attack by enemy aircraft and missiles. The resulting specification called for a medium-range missile, capable of being used in all weather conditions; in addition to its air defense role, the missile was intended to possess a secondary capability in the surface-to-surface mission for use against enemy ships.

In July 1968, the project was assigned the Mission Designation System designation ZRIM-85A, the "Z" indicating a project in the planning stage; however, the program was cancelled later that year, before any significant design work on the missile, or any development of hardware, had been conducted.
