= RIM-101 =

RIM-101A
- Type: Surface-to-air missile
- Place of origin: United States

Service history
- Used by: United States Navy

Production history
- Designed: 1973

Specifications
- Warhead: PBX-W107
- Guidance system: Midcouse: semi-active radar homing Terminal: infrared homing

RIM-101 was a short-lived project by the United States Navy to develop a surface-to-air missile (SAM) for the defense of naval vessels. Developed during the early 1970s, the project, possibly derived from the RIM-7 Sea Sparrow, was cancelled before the start of detailed design work.

== Development and cancellation ==
In the early 1970s, the United States Navy initiated a project for the development of a new surface-to-air missile to act as a defense against air and missile attack against its vessels. The project received the planning designation ZRIM-101A in 1973.

The RIM-101 missile was planned to be a tube-launched weapon, a small ejector charge being used to propel the missile from its launching tube before ignition of a solid-fueled rocket sustainer, based on that of the FIM-43 Redeye SAM. Midcourse guidance of the new missile was planned to be of the semi-active radar homing type, using an I-band radar system, while terminal guidance would be provided by an infrared seeker. However, the RIM-101 project was cancelled early in the design-and-development stage, before any hardware had been built.

It has been speculated that the RIM-101 was intended to be an advanced development of the RIM-7 Sea Sparrow missile, then in U.S. Navy service as the Basic Point Defense Missile System. While the basic RIM-7 does not match the description of RIM-101, an advanced development of the RIM-7E would fit the timeframe and description, with RIM-7F being developed following the cancellation of RIM-101.
