= Sea Wolf (missile) =

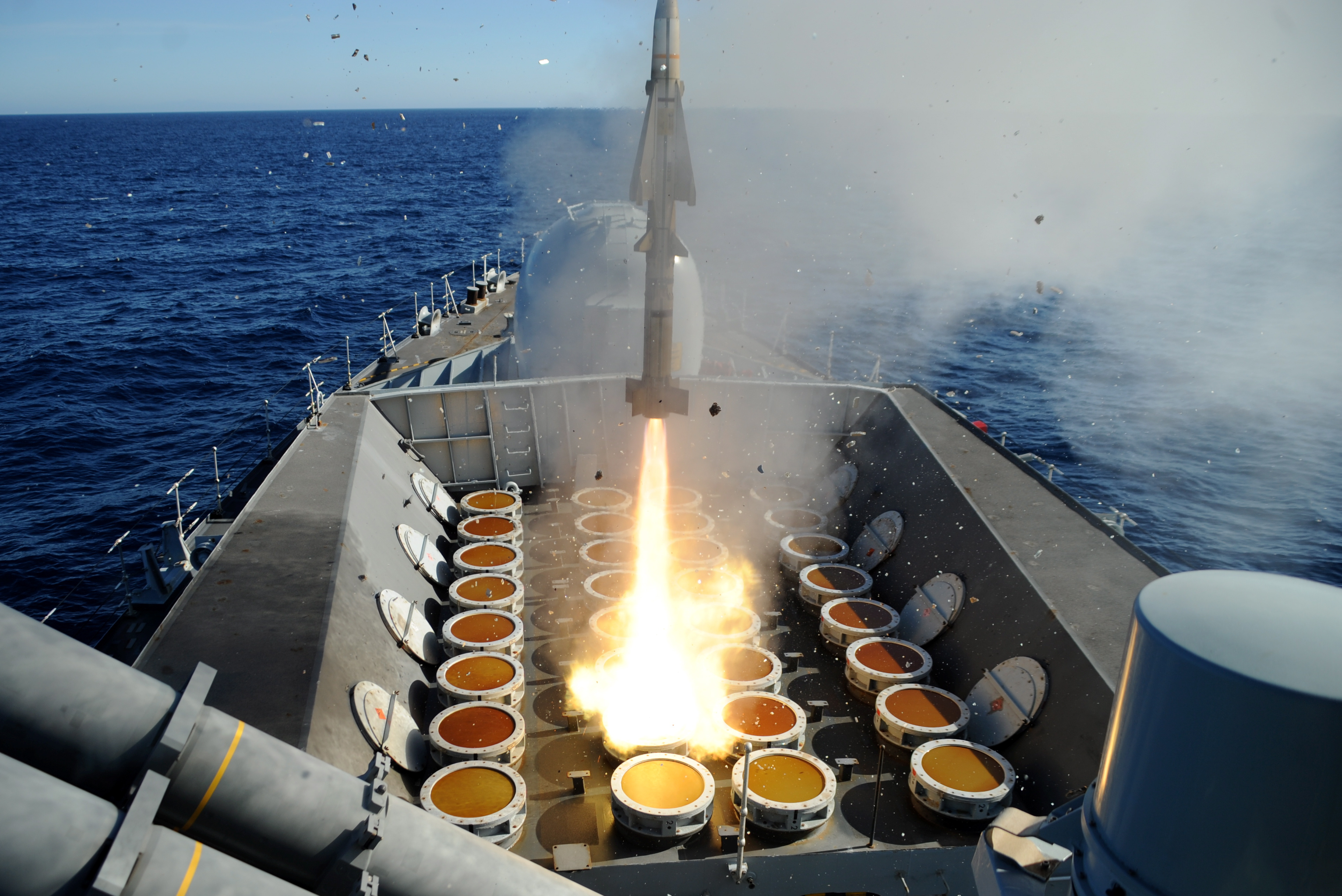
- Type 23 frigate HMS Portland fires a vertical-launch Sea Wolf.
- Type: Surface-to-air
- Place of origin: United Kingdom

Service history
- In service: Since 1979
- Used by: See operators
- Wars: Falklands War, Gulf War

Production history
- Designer: British Aircraft Corporation
- Designed: 1967
- Manufacturer: British Aircraft Corporation (1967–1977); BAe Dynamics (1977–1999); MBDA UK (since 1999)
- Produced: 1979
- Variants: Electronics; GWS-25, GWS-26, GWS-27; Vertical Launch

Specifications
- Mass: 82 kg (180.8 lb)
- Length: 1.9 m (6 ft 2.8 in)
- Diameter: 180 mm (7.1 in)
- Wingspan: 450 mm (17.7 in)
- Warhead: 14 kg (30.9 lb) HE blast-fragmentation
- Detonation mechanism: Direct contact/proximity fuze activated
- Engine: Blackcap solid fuel sustainer
- Operational range: 1–10 km (0.5–5.4 nmi), VLS
- Flight ceiling: 3,000 m (9,842.5 ft)
- Maximum speed: Mach 3 (3,700 km/h; 2,300 mph)
- Guidance system: Automatic Command to Line-Of-Sight (ACLOS)
- Steering system: Control surfaces
- Launch platform: Ship

Sea Wolf is a naval surface-to-air missile system designed and built by BAC, later to become British Aerospace (BAe) Dynamics, and now MBDA. It is an automated point-defence weapon system designed as a short-range defence against both sea-skimming and high angle anti-ship missiles and aircraft. The Royal Navy has fielded two versions, the GWS-25 Conventionally Launched Sea Wolf (CLSW) and the GWS-26 Vertically Launched Sea Wolf (VLSW) forms. In Royal Navy service Sea Wolf has been replaced by Sea Ceptor.

== History ==
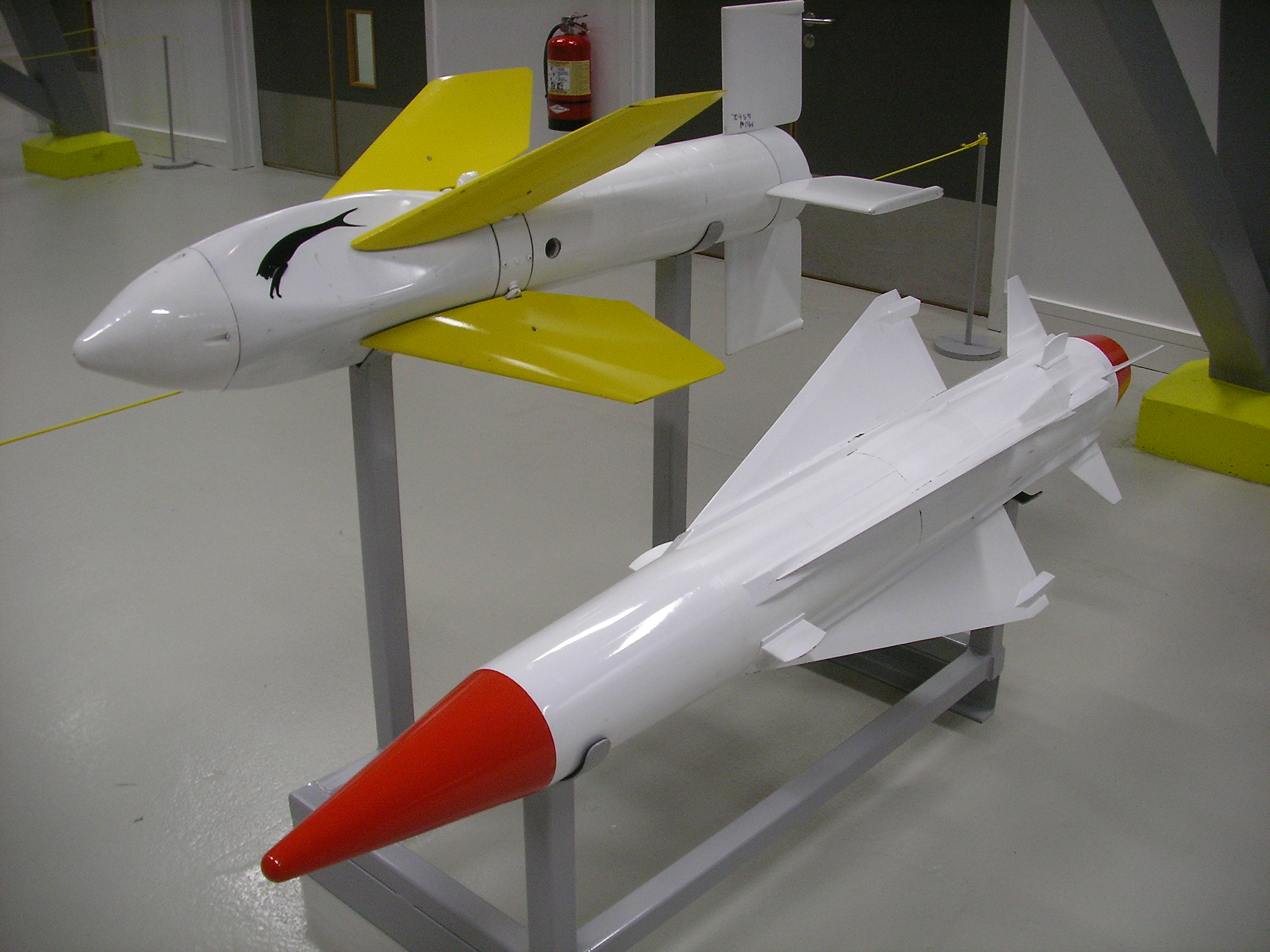
Seawolf (right) replaced Seacat (left). at IMW Duxford

The earliest point-defence missile used by the Royal Navy was the Seacat, which had been rapidly developed from an earlier anti-tank missile design, the Malkara. As a weapon originally designed to operate against slow-moving ground vehicles, the missile had subsonic performance and was of limited capability against even early jet aircraft. It was used largely due to the ease which it could be adapted to the role simply by replacing the original wire guidance system with a radio command link, and that its small size allowed multi-round launchers to be fitted to ships in place of their Bofors 40 mm guns. It entered service in 1961, the first point-defence missile to do so.

The limited performance was understood to be a problem from the start and a requirement for a higher performance replacement was published in 1964. British Aircraft Corporation (BAC) won a 1967 development contract along with Vickers and Bristol Aerojet. Although only slightly longer and heavier than Seacat, Sea Wolf offered dramatically higher performance, with a top speed on the order of Mach 3, an effective range roughly double that of Seacat, and a fully automated guidance system that made engagements much simpler.

Testing lasted from 1970 until 1977, with shipborne trials on a modified Leander class frigate, HMS Penelope, from 1976. Sea Wolf was tested with a vertical launch system early in the development period on a modified Loch class frigate, HMS Loch Fada but for obscure reasons work did not continue in this direction: the GWS-26 "VL Seawolf (VLS)" being a much later (1980s) development. During trials, the missile performed impressively, once intercepting a 114 mm (4.5 in) shell.

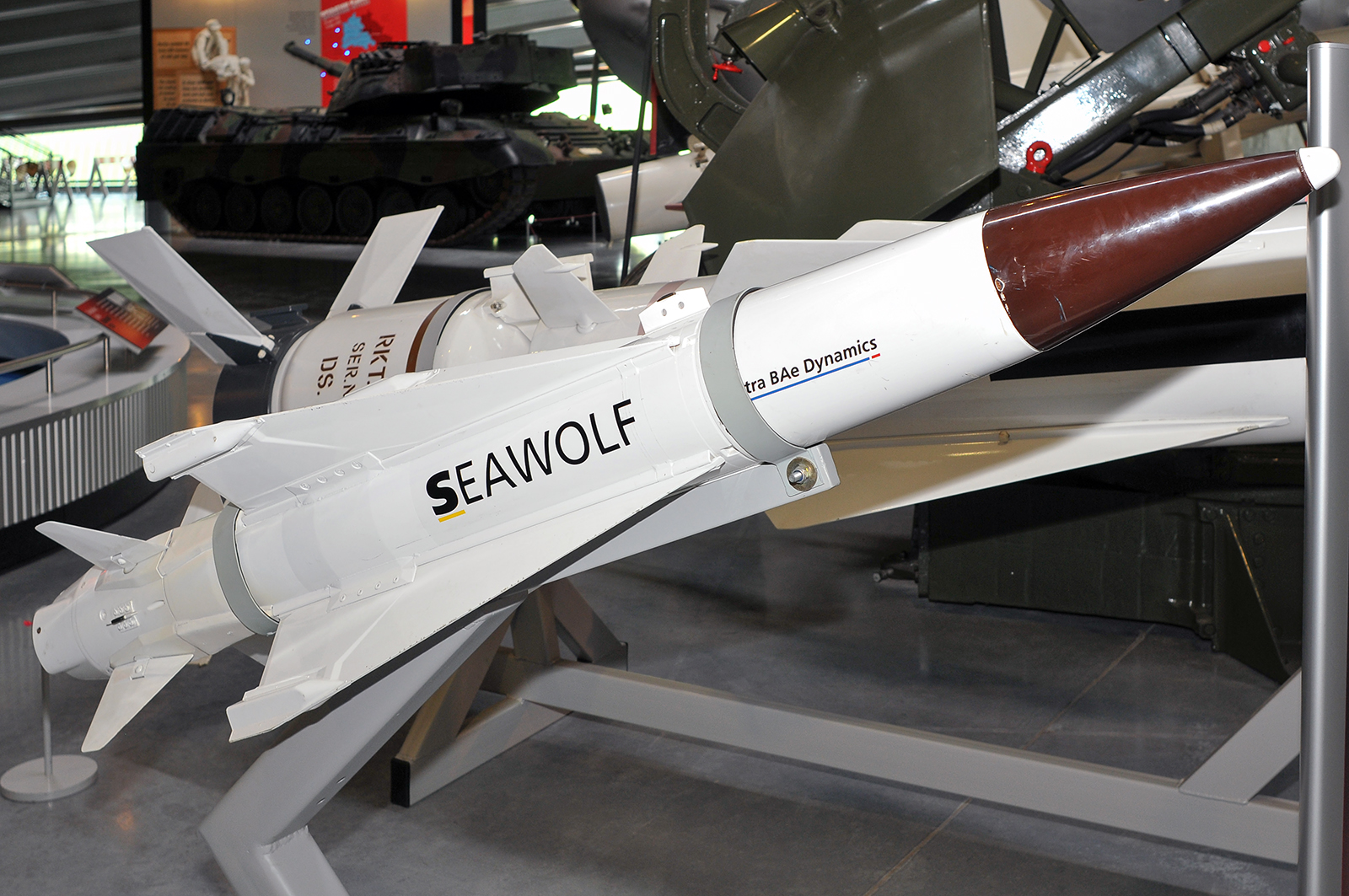
Sea Wolf at RAF Museum Cosford.

The first deployment, in the GWS-25 form, was on the Type 22 frigate (2 systems) and later on modified Leander class frigates (1 system) in six-round, manually-loaded trainable launchers. It entered service with the Royal Navy in 1979 and was used during the Falklands War. The current version is the GWS-26 Mod 1 system on Type 23 frigates, fielding 32 vertical launch missiles (VL Sea Wolf) in its missile silo. It is expected to remain in service until 2020.

== Description ==
Sea Wolf is powered by the Blackcap solid-fuel rocket to a maximum velocity of Mach 2, and can intercept targets at ranges between 1,000 and 6,000 m (1,100 and 6,600 yd) and altitudes from 10 m (33 ft) to 3,000 m (9,800 ft). The warhead weighs 14 kg (30.9 lb) and is a proximity fuzed HE-fragmenting type. In the manually loaded form, the missiles are stored on board in maintenance-free canisters, sealed until use and handled like a round of ammunition.

=== Fire control ===
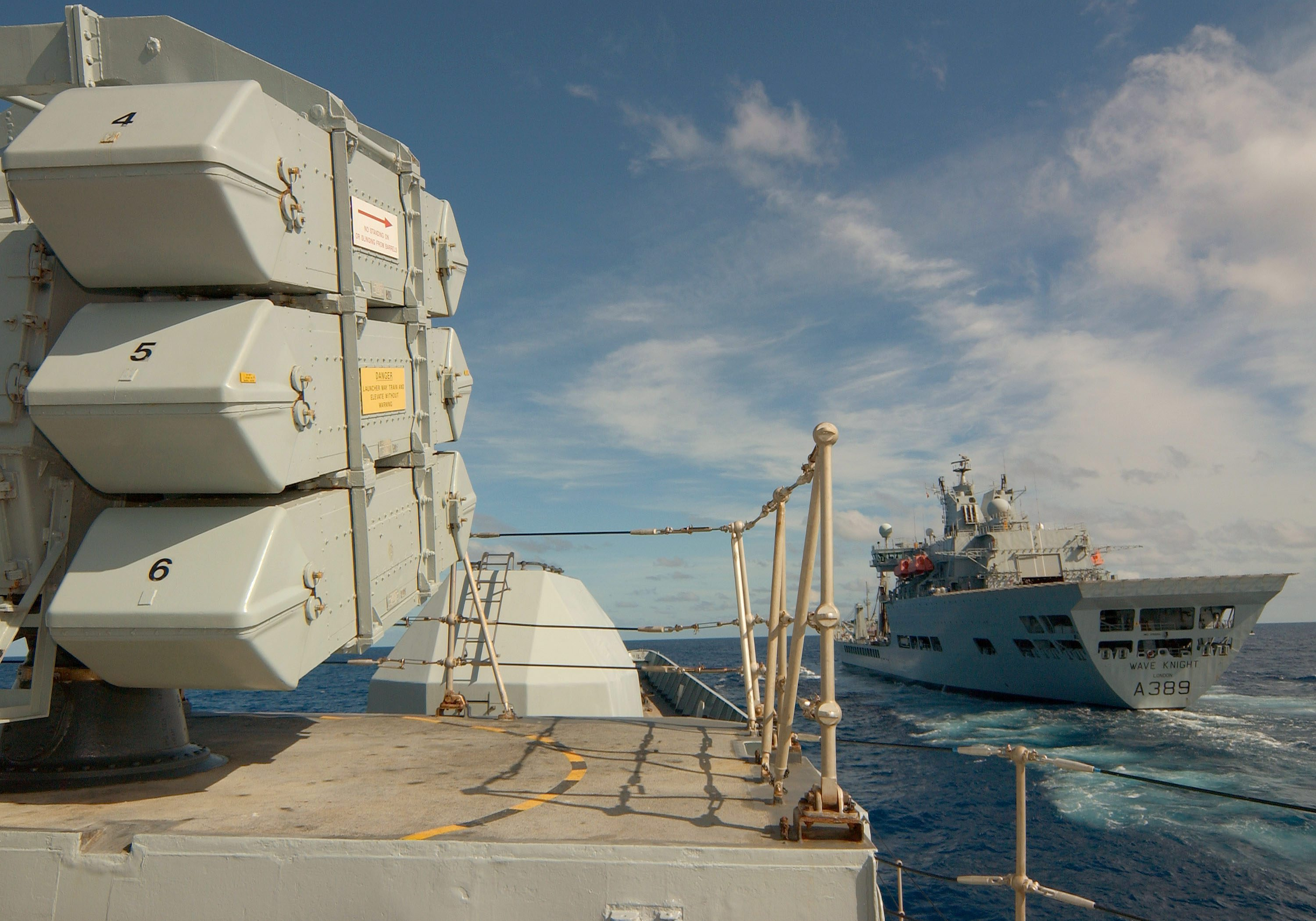
Original GWS-25 sextuple launcher on the Type 22 frigate HMS Cumberland.

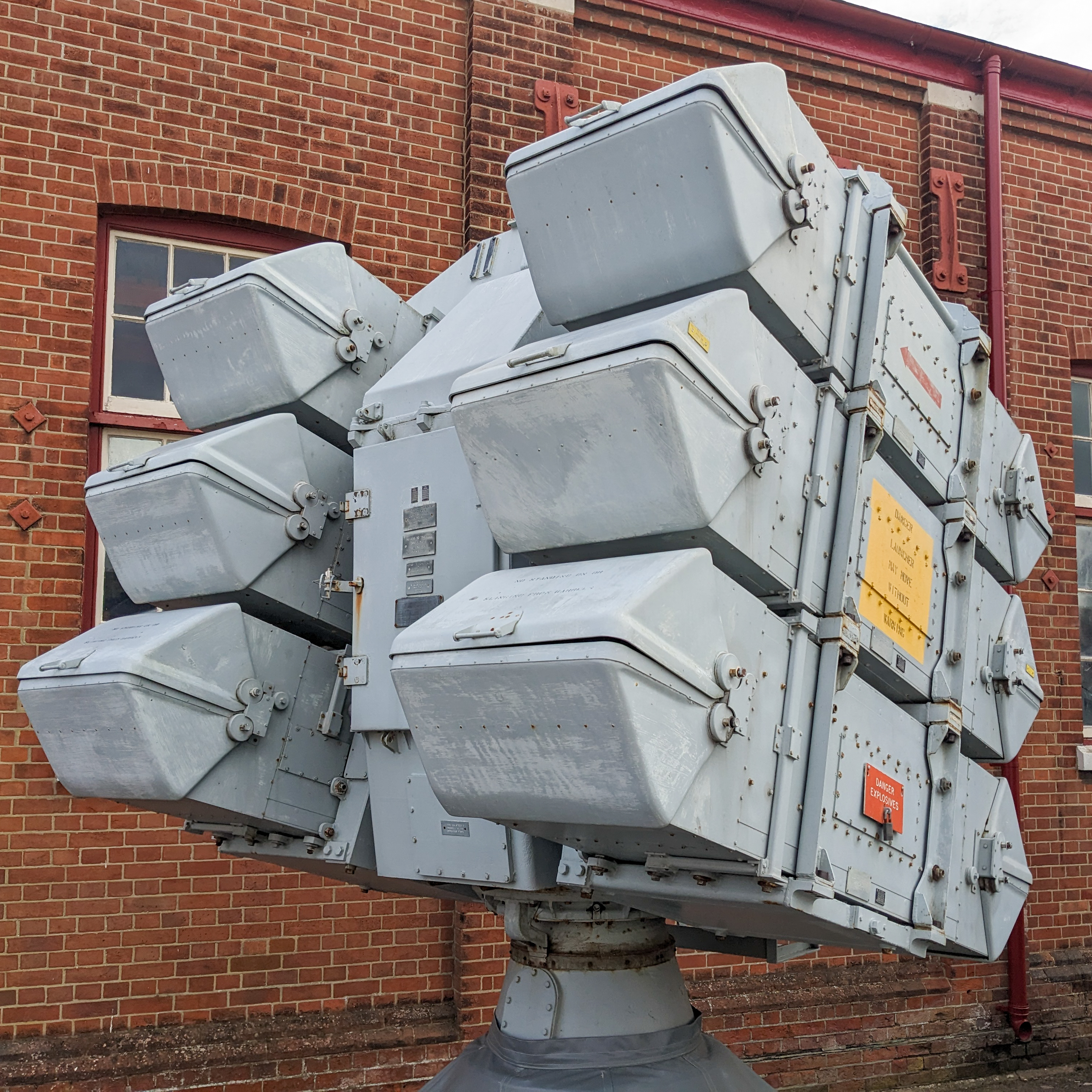
Sea Wolf GWS-25 missile launcher at Explosion Museum of Naval Firepower

The standard mode is fully automated and uses radar tracking. Target detection is carried out using the ship's surveillance radars. In the Type 22- and Sea Wolf-equipped Leander class, this was the radar Type 967–968 combination; the D-band Type 967 providing long-range surveillance and the E-band Type 968 providing short-range target indication. On the Type 23 frigates, these functions have been taken over by the Type 996 3D surveillance radar. Target data is processed by the ship's computers and when the system is live, targets are automatically assigned and engaged automatically (although this can be over-ridden by the Missile Director (MD) in the Operations Room).

When a target is to be engaged, the ship's computer slews one of the two Sea Wolf trackers onto the target (there was a single tracker on a Sea Wolf Leander). Originally the Type 910, with an I-band radar, was used but this suffered from poor performance locking onto low-altitude targets hidden in the background sea clutter in the Falklands War. Low-level targets had to be engaged using the 910's secondary TV mode to manually track the target. The lighter Type 911 supplanted the Type 910, adding a second radar (a K-band set based on the Blindfire tracker of the Rapier missile, to control engagements at low level) and was fitted in the 7th Type 22 Frigate onwards. Unlike Type 910, Type 911 does not have any TV function; the TV camera is retained only to allow the Missile Director to visually confirm targets and to provide a record of engagements.

As the Leander and Type 22 classes did not possess a 3D radar set, the altitude of the target had to be acquired by the tracker itself by vertically scanning the airspace on the bearing given by a target indication radar (Type 967–968) until a target lock could be acquired. When lock has been achieved by the missile tracker and the system's rules of engagement were fullfiled, a round is fired and tracked by a pair of radio beacons in the missile's tail. The ship-board system constantly measures the angle differences between the target and the missile and issues guidance commands to the missile through an Automatic Command to Line of Sight (ACLOS) device transmitting on a microwave link controlling the rear fins of the missile. It is possible for a tracker to control a salvo of two missiles. The radar and CCTV guidance system were developed by Marconi Radar at Great Baddow, Essex. The guidance receiver was developed and built by Plessey Avionics and Communications in Ilford, Essex.

== Combat performance ==
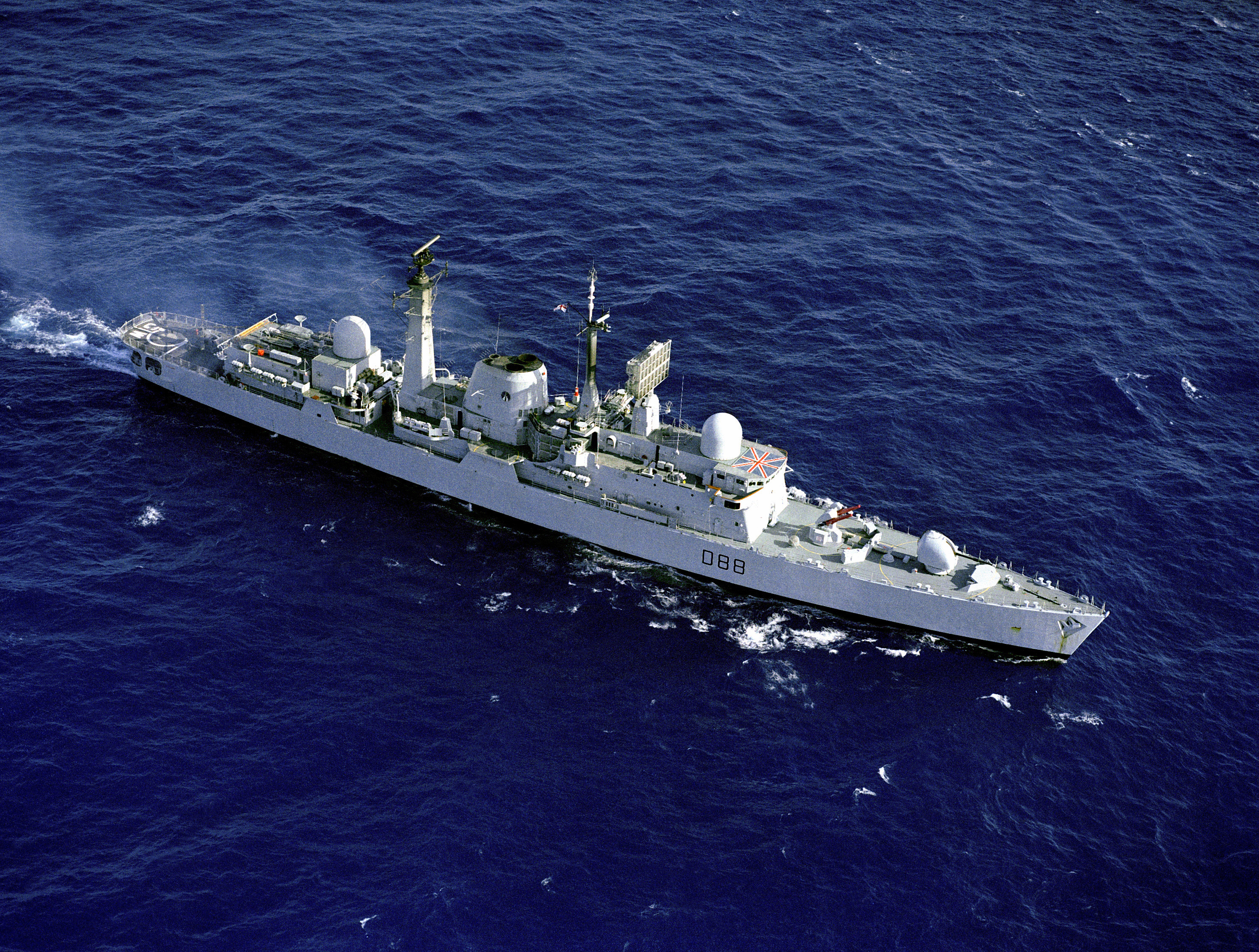
HMS Glasgow

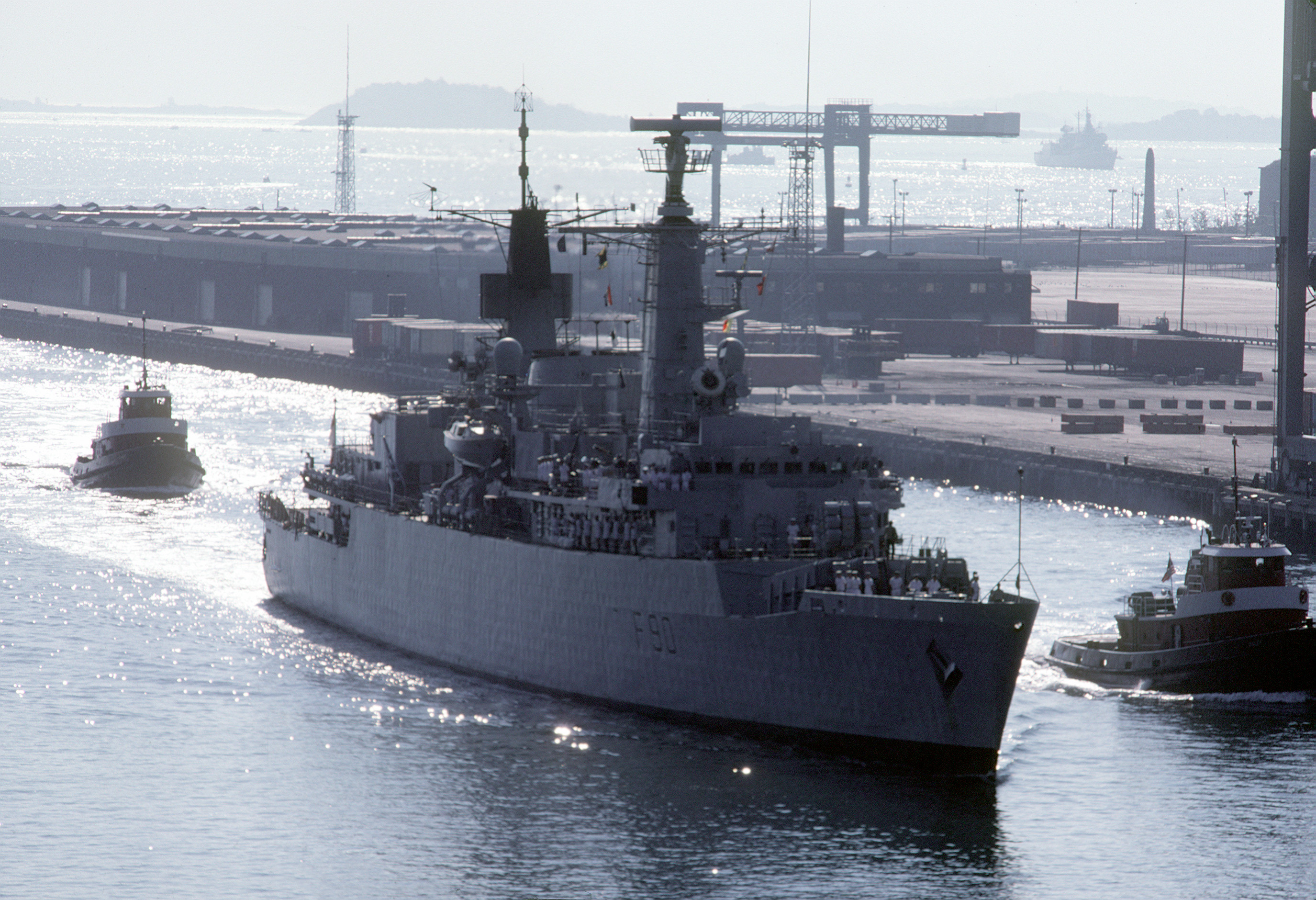
HMS Brilliant

The Type 42/22 combination achieved some degree of success during the Falklands Conflict, but the Sea Wolf armed ships were unable to prevent the loss of HMS Coventry and heavy damage to HMS Glasgow.

During the Falklands War, Sea Wolf was the Royal Navy's only modern point-defence weapon. It equipped the Type 22 frigates HMS Brilliant, HMS Broadsword and the Batch 3A Leander class frigate HMS Andromeda. These ships were assigned "goalkeeper" duties, to provide close anti-aircraft defence of the carrier task force.

In an attempt to overcome the fleet's overall air defence deficiency following the loss of HMS Sheffield, a new tactic was devised, which saw each of the two Type 22 frigates paired with each of the two remaining Type 42 (area air defence) destroyers. The pairing was unofficially termed "Type 64", the sum of both classes numbers. The two pairs were deployed some distance from the main fleet, covering likely attack routes, in an attempt to draw attacking aircraft into a "missile trap", the intention being that, if the Type 42 was unable to engage targets at longer ranges with its Sea Dart missiles, the Type 22 would use its short-range Sea Wolf missiles to defend both ships.

On 12 May 1982, Brilliant and HMS Glasgow were operating in combination and were attacked by two flights of four Argentine Douglas A-4 Skyhawk aircraft. Brilliant shot down two of these and caused a third to crash trying to avoid the missile. The second wave of aircraft attacked during a failure of the missile system and the Type 42 Glasgow sustained damage.

On 25 May 1982, HMS Coventry and Broadsword also operating in a 22/42 combination to the north-west of Falkland Sound came under attack by two waves of two A-4 Skyhawks. Broadsword attempted to target the first pair with Sea Wolf but the tracking system locked down and could not be reset before the aircraft released their bombs. Broadsword was hit by one bomb, which bounced up through the deck and destroyed her Westland Lynx helicopter. The second pair of Skyhawks headed for Coventry 90 seconds later at a 20-degree angle to her port bow. On Broadsword the Sea Wolf system had been reset and acquired the attacking aircraft but Coventry's evasive manoeuvring took her through the line of fire and the lock was lost. Coventry was struck by three bombs and sank shortly after.

Sea Wolf suffered from problems with hardware failure causing launches to fail, broken locks from the extreme sea conditions and the Argentines' low-altitude hit-and-run tactics with multiple, crossing targets which it was not designed to intercept.

Sea Wolf accounted for three confirmed "kills" and two further possibles from eight launches.

== Variants ==
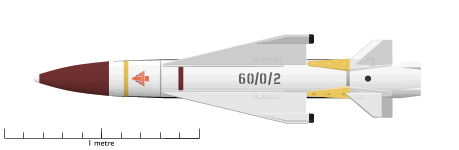
A trainable launcher type GWS-25 Sea Wolf missile. The GWS-26 vertical launch missile has a large booster motor in tandem.

=== Vertical launch (VL) Sea Wolf GWS-26 ===
Instead of a launcher that is aimed at the target by the fire-control system, VL Sea Wolf uses a vertical-launch system (VLS). Missiles are launched vertically by a Cadiz booster motor and turnover pack, to clear the ship's superstructure and rapidly flipped onto their flight path by thrust vectoring. The booster motor, which also increases the range of VL Sea Wolf from 6.5 km (4.0 mi) to 10 km (6.2 mi), then separates from the missile, which flies on to engage the target.

Although vertical launch had been explored much earlier in Sea Wolf's development, it was not until the 1980s that a production design was undertaken. VLS went into service, using the GWS-26 system, on the Type 23 frigate HMS Norfolk. Type 23 frigates have a 32-cell VLS, each cell holding one VL Sea Wolf for a total of 32 missiles. The cells, or canisters, are housed vertically in the ship's magazine such that the top of the canisters protrude from the magazine.

=== Block 2 ===
Block 2 Sea Wolf is a replenishment upgrade to the existing stocks of Sea Wolf missiles. Block 2 missiles have replaced all Sea Wolf missiles, both on Type 22 and Type 23 frigates, as part of normal ammunition replenishment operations. In a parallel programme ("Sea Wolf Mid-Life Update") the associated Type 911 tracker is being upgraded by the addition of an infra-red camera, enhanced tracking software and new operator's consoles.

=== GWS-27 ===
Proposed "fire-and-forget" development with an active radar seeker instead of command guidance for dealing with saturation attacks. GWS-27 was cancelled in 1987.

=== Lightweight Sea Wolf ===
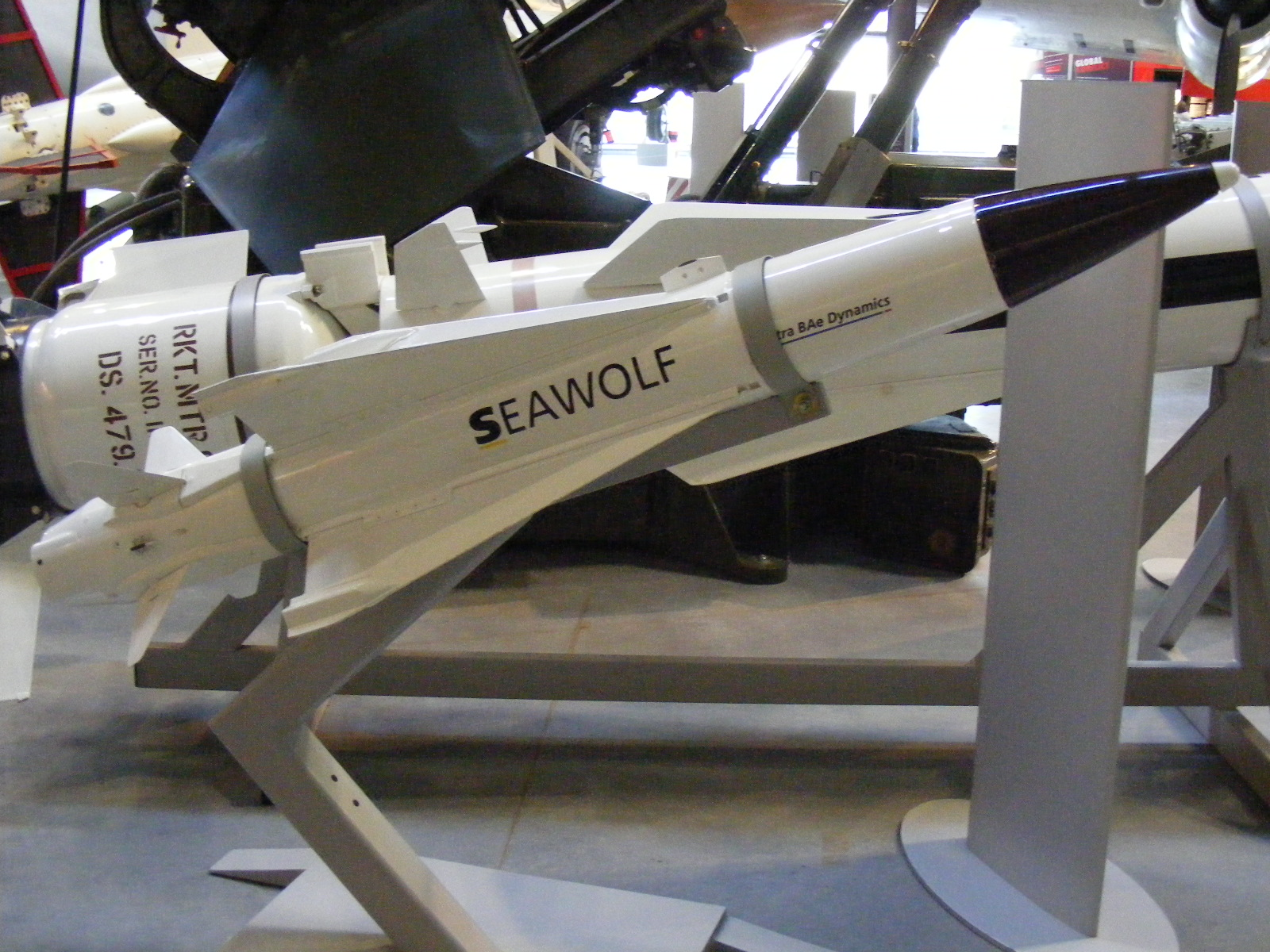
Sea Wolf at RAF Museum Cosford.

Sea Wolf was not designed as a particularly lightweight system, the original GWS-25 variant with Type 910 tracking required 13.5 tonnes (13.3 long tons; 14.9 short tons) of tracking and below-decks fire-control equipments, reduced to 5 t (4.9 long tons; 5.5 short tons) with the upgraded Type 911 tracker. The "broad-beam" Leander-class frigate of 2,500 t (2,500 long tons) standard displacement could carry only a single missile system, and required some significant structural "surgery" of the upperworks to counteract the weight of the new missile system. Sea Wolf in its original guise cannot therefore be easily added to existing vessels. For this reason, the Lightweight Sea Wolf variant was designed to use a four-missile launcher, similar in form to that of the obsolete Sea Cat system. It was intended to equip the Royal Navy's Invincible class carriers and Type 42 destroyers to supplement the medium range Sea Dart system, which was not as capable of intercepting sea-skimming missiles. However, it was cancelled before it entered service.

== Replacement ==
At the DSEI conference in September 2007 it was announced that the UK Ministry of Defence was funding a study by MBDA to investigate a replacement for Sea Wolf which is scheduled to leave service about 2018. MBDA was later contracted to replace the Vertical-Launch Sea Wolf weapons system on the Royal Navy's Type 23 frigates as part of the Future Local Anti-air Defence System (Maritime) or FLAADS(M). The system chosen was the Common Anti-Air Modular Missile (CAMM) which would be known in Royal Navy service as "Sea Ceptor" and will also be jointly used by the British Army's new Sky Sabre air defence system under the name "Land Ceptor". CAMM is derived from and shares components with the Advanced Short Range Air-to-Air Missile (ASRAAM) missile in service with the Royal Air Force.

Sea Ceptor entered service on the Type 23 frigates in 2018 replacing the Sea Wolf and will also be integrated onto the forthcoming Type 26 and Type 31 frigates when they enter service in the late 2020s. Sea Ceptor will also replace the Aster 15 missiles on the Type 45 Destroyers between 2026 and 2032.

== Operators ==
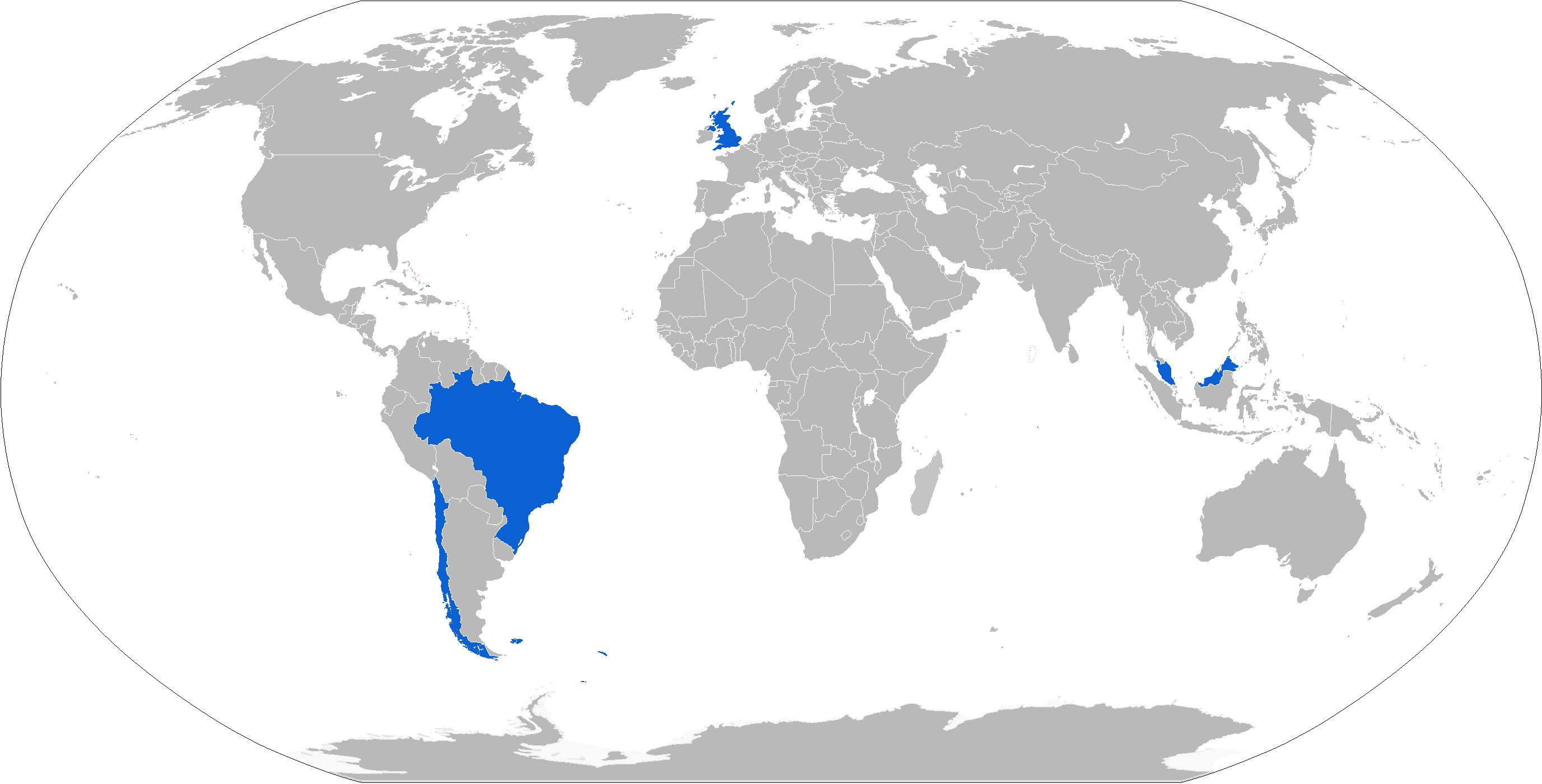
Map of Sea Wolf operators in blue

=== Current operators ===
- Brazil
- Malaysia

=== Former operators ===
- United Kingdom (replaced by CAMM)
- Chile (replaced by CAMM)
- Indonesia

== See also ==
- List of missiles
- CAMM – (United Kingdom, Italy) - Also known as 'Sea Ceptor' has replaced the Sea Wolf missile in service with the Royal Navy.
- Barak 1 – (Israel)
- RIM-113 – (United States)
