= Type 11 75 mm AA gun =

Japanese Type 11 75mm AA gun
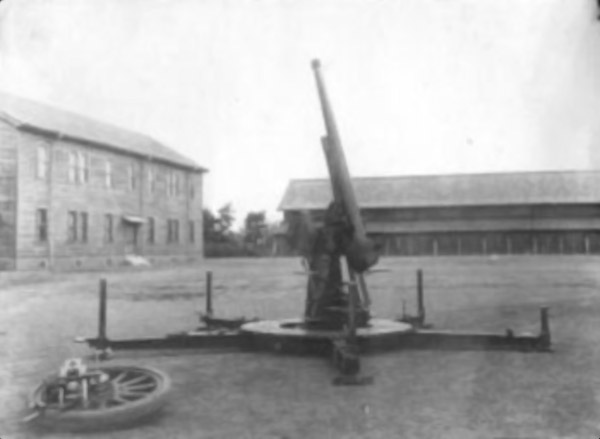
- Type 11 75mm anti-aircraft gun
- Type: Anti-aircraft gun
- Place of origin: Empire of Japan

Service history
- In service: 1922–1940
- Used by: Imperial Japanese Army
- Wars: Second Sino-Japanese War

Production history
- Designed: 1920
- No. built: 44

Specifications
- Mass: 2.061 tons
- Barrel length: 2.562 m (8 ft 5 in) L/34
- Crew: 6
- Caliber: 75 mm (2.95 in)
- Breech: sliding
- Carriage: none
- Elevation: 0° to +85°
- Traverse: 360°
- Muzzle velocity: 525 m/s (1,720 ft/s)
- Effective firing range: 6,650 m (21,820 ft)
- Maximum firing range: 10,900 m (11,900 yd)

The Type 11 75 mm anti-aircraft gun (十一年式七糎半野戦高射砲, Jūichinen-shiki nana-senchi-han Yasen Kōshahō) was an anti-aircraft gun used by the Imperial Japanese Army after World War I. The Type 11 designation was given to this gun as it was accepted in the 11th year of Emperor Taishō's reign (1922). It was the first anti-aircraft gun in Japanese service, but only a small number were produced, and it was superseded by the Type 14 10 cm gun and the Type 88 75 mm gun in active service before the start of World War II.

== History and development ==
Due to combat experience at the Battle of Tsingtao against the Imperial German Luftstreitkräfte’s fledgling squadron of combat aircraft, planners on the Imperial Japanese Army General Staff quickly realized that this new technology posed a threat which required countermeasures. This evaluation was further reinforced by reports from military observers on the European front in World War I.

The Type 11 gun was placed into production in 1922, taking design features from a number of overseas design, including the British QF 3-inch 20 cwt anti-aircraft gun. However, it was expensive to produce and lacked both accuracy and range of fire. Only 44 units were completed before production was terminated.

== Design ==
The Type 11 75 mm AA gun had a single piece gun barrel with sliding breech, mounted on a central pedestal. The firing platform was supported by five legs, each of which (along with the central pedestal) had an adjustable screwed foot for leveling. It fired a 6.5 kg (14 lb) projectile to an effective altitude of 6,650 m (21,820 ft).

== Combat record ==
The Type 11 75 mm AA gun saw limited service with Japanese combat forces during the invasion of Manchuria, Soviet-Japanese Border Wars and the Second Sino-Japanese War. It was withdrawn from active service prior to the start of the Pacific War.
