= 8.8 cm SK C/30 naval gun =

8.8 cm SK C/30
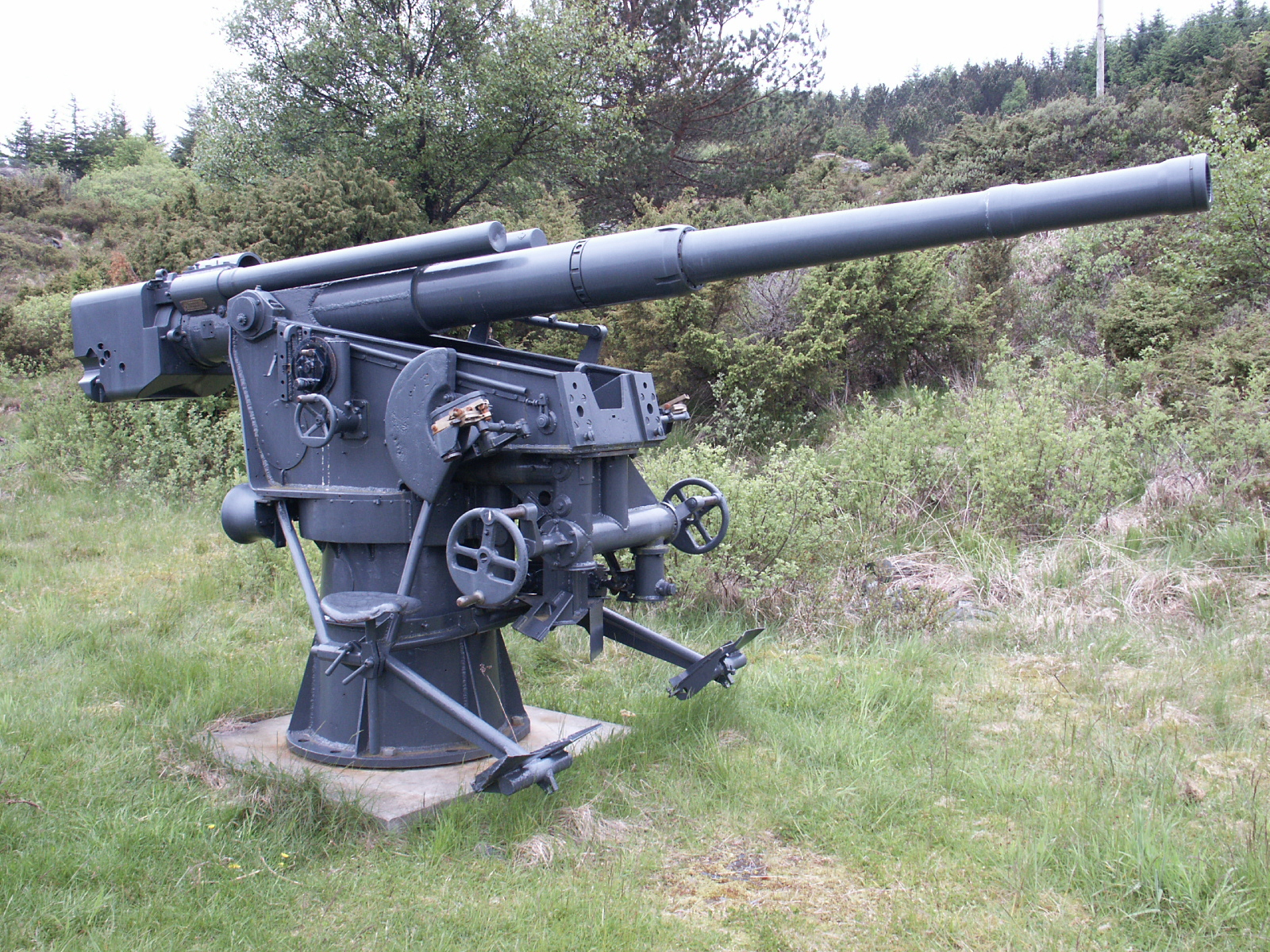
- A restored gun preserved at Fjell Fortress in Norway
- Type: Naval gun Anti-aircraft gun
- Place of origin: Germany

Service history
- In service: 1933—1945
- Used by: Nazi Germany; Republic of China
- Wars: World War II

Production history
- Designed: 1930–1933

Specifications
- Mass: 1,230 kilograms (2,710 lb)
- Length: 3.96 meters (13 ft 0 in)
- Barrel length: 3.706 meters (12 ft 1.9 in) (bore length)
- Shell: Fixed QF
- Shell weight: 9–10 kilograms (20–22 lb)
- Caliber: 88 millimeters (3.5 in)
- Breech: Vertical sliding-block
- Elevation: -10° to +80°
- Traverse: 360°
- Rate of fire: 15 rpm
- Muzzle velocity: 790 m/s (2,600 ft/s)
- Effective firing range: Horizontal: 14,175 metres (15,502 yd) at +43.5° Vertical: 9,700 metres (10,600 yd) at +80°

The 8.8 cm SK C/30 (Note: SK - Schnelladekanone (quick loading cannon); C - Construktionsjahr (year of design)) was a German naval gun that was used in World War II. The SK C/30 guns were intended for smaller warships such as submarine chasers and corvettes.

== Description ==
The SK C/30 had a barrel and breech end-piece with a half-length loose liner and a vertical sliding breech block. The SK C/30 guns were mounted on a hand-operated MPLC/30 mounting that had a total weight of 5,760 kilograms (12,700 lb) including a 15–10 millimetres (0.59–0.39 in) shield and a fuze-setting machine. However, they were significantly lighter than the older 8.8 cm SK L/45 naval guns. Captured guns from the Chinese National Revolutionary Army were reverse engineered in 1938 by the Imperial Japanese Army and introduced as Type 99 88 mm AA gun.

=== Ammunition ===
Fixed type ammunition with and without tracer, which weighed 15 kg (33 lb), with a projectile length of 385.5 mm (15.18 in) was fired. Ammunition Types Available:

- Armour Piercing (AP) - 10 kg (22 lb)
- High Explosive (HE) - 9 kg (20 lb)
- High Explosive Incendiary (HEI) - 9.5 kg (21 lb)
- Illumination (ILLUM) - 9.4 kg (21 lb)

== See also ==
- List of naval guns
