= RIM-113 =

XRIM-113A
- Type: Surface-to-air missile
- Place of origin: United States

Production history
- Designed: 1976-1979

The RIM-113 Shipboard Intermediate Range Combat System, or SIRCS, was an advanced surface-to-air missile proposed by the United States Navy in the 1970s. The project failed to be approved for funding and was cancelled in 1979.

== Concept ==
The United States Navy Naval Surface Weapons Center began the development of an advanced surface-to-air missile for defense against cruise missile attack in 1976. Based on the previous Anti-Ship Missile Defense (ASMD) studies and known as the Shipboard Intermediate Range Combat System, the new missile was intended as a replacement for the RIM-7 Sea Sparrow as the standard point-defense weapon for U.S. Navy ships, with the specification calling for the capability to engage between four and fourteen independent targets at once, depending on the size of the launching ship.

== Development and cancellation ==
The designation XRIM-113A, indicating an experimental ship-launched interceptor missile, was allocated to the SIRCS project in May 1976, and contracts were awarded to three separate teams of contractors - RCA/Martin-Marietta, McDonnell Douglas/Sperry, and Raytheon/Lockheed/Univac - for initial studies of the SIRCS missile concept, in anticipation of a competitive evaluation.

By 1978, the study phase of development was completed. The McDonnell Douglas/Sperry team had examined the use of the British Aerospace Sea Wolf missile, which failed to meet the full specification, but was the only existing missile that approached the SIRCS requirements. Sea Wolf was anticipated to be able to enter service in 1979 if selected as a worthwhile basis for the further development; a newly designed missile would push the expected in-service date to 1983. However, the United States Congress refused to allocate funding for the further development of the RIM-113 missile. A proposal was made for joint development of SIRCS with the U.S. Air Force's AMRAAM project;, but this came to naught, and the RIM-113 was cancelled in 1979.
