= Type 96 AA gun prime mover =

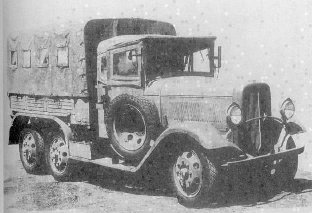
- Place of origin: Empire of Japan

Specifications
- Mass: 4 tons
- Length: 5.75m
- Width: 1.90m
- Height: 2.6m
- Crew: 15
- Main armament: Towing of a Type 88 75 mm AA gun
- Engine: air-cooled gasoline or diesel
- Suspension: wheeled
- Maximum speed: 60 km/hour

The Type 96 AA gun prime mover is a Japanese 6-wheeled prime mover used during the Second World War. It entered service in 1937.

During the 1920s, the Imperial Japanese Army (IJA) used several types of trucks to transport Anti-aircraft guns. In 1936 the Type 96 AA "gun tractor" was developed from the Type 94 6-wheeled truck. The Type-94 was first produced in 1934 and shown to be reliable. First produced in 1937, the Type 96 was basically the same as the Type 94, but "the transmission was improved and a winch was added to the tail". The engine utilized to power the Type 96 was produced in a gasoline version (Ko engine) and a diesel version (Otsu engine). The rear platform was "modified to carry crews and equipment" for the Type 88 75 mm AA gun. During World War II, the Type 88 75 mm AA gun was deployed to virtually every anti-aircraft field artillery unit as protection against medium level aircraft attacks.

== See also ==
- Type 98 20 mm AA machine cannon carrier
