= Matra M.04 =

- Type: Air-to-air missile
- Place of origin: France

Production history
- Designed: 1948
- Manufacturer: Matra

Specifications
- Mass: 460 kilograms (1,010 lb)
- Length: 4.6 metres (15 ft)
- Diameter: 0.25 metres (9.8 in)
- Wingspan: 1.8 metres (5 ft 11 in)
- Engine: Solid-fuel rocket 1,250 kg thrust for 14 seconds
- Propellant: Acid/Aniline rocket
- Launch platform: Halifax (testing)

The Matra M.04 was a French missile project that began development in Societe Matra in 1948. Intended either as an air-to-air missile or a surface-to-air missile it was never adopted in service, although it was tested over the Sahara in 1952.

== Development ==
The missile was first test-fired in flight from a Halifax bomber in May 1950 at Colomb-Bechar. The missile was large for an air-to-air missile, with two pairs of cruciform swept wings, with the smaller rear pair being moved using pneumatic actuation to provide steering. A SEPR acid/aniline rocket containing 110 kg of propellent provided 1,250 kg of thrust for 14 seconds, taking it to a speed of 490 meters per second.

The surface-to-air version was intended to have an additional tandem booster stage, and was designated the R.042 - and work continued on it until 1955.
