= Type 88 75 mm AA gun =

Japanese Type 88 75 mm AA gun
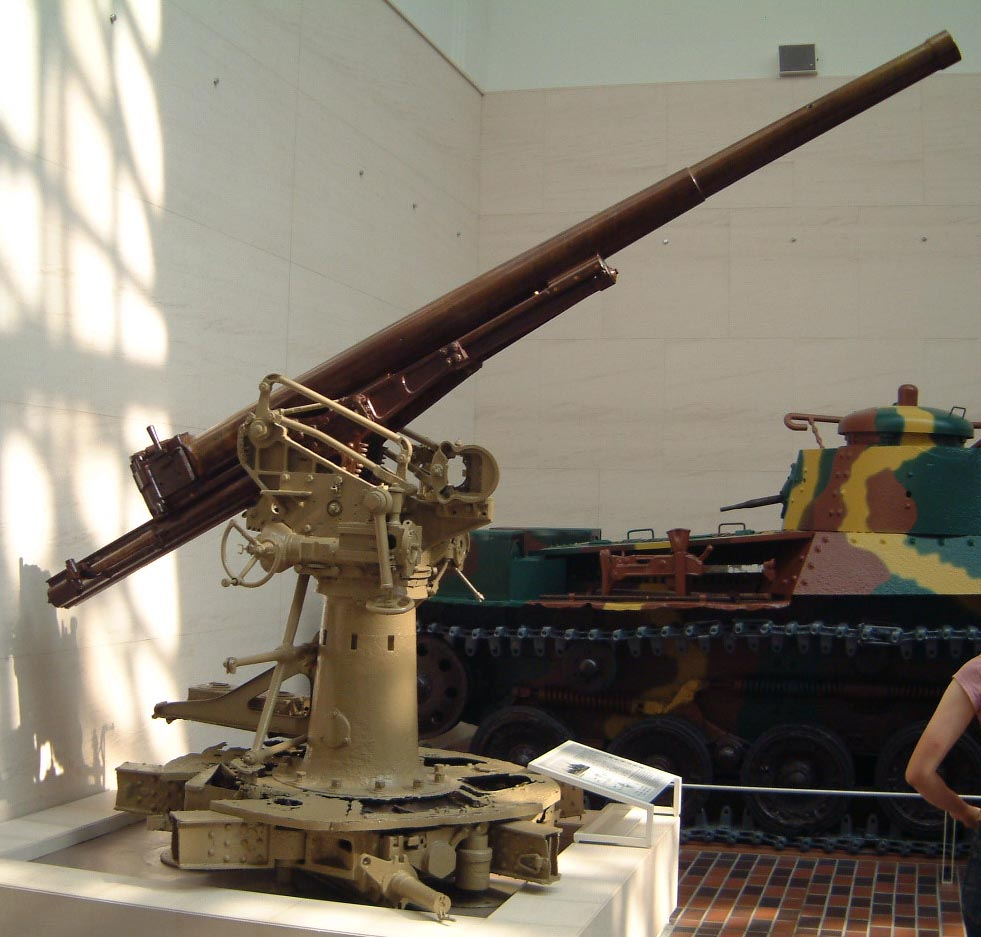
- Type 88 75 mm AA gun at Yasukuni Shrine, Tokyo
- Type: Anti-aircraft gun
- Place of origin: Empire of Japan

Service history
- In service: 1927–1945
- Used by: Imperial Japanese Army; Manchukuo Imperial Army
- Wars: Second Sino-Japanese War; Soviet-Japanese Border Wars; World War II; First Indochina War

Production history
- Designed: 1925-1926
- No. built: 2000+

Specifications
- Mass: 2,445 kg (5,390 lb) Firing; 2,739.2 kg (6,039 lb) Traveling
- Length: 5.03 m (16 ft 6 in) Firing; 4.5 m (14 ft 9 in) Traveling
- Barrel length: 3.212 m (10 ft) L/44
- Width: 1.6 m (5 ft 3 in) Track; 1.93 m (6 ft 4 in) Maximum firing
- Height: 2.01 m (6 ft 7 in)
- Crew: 12 (min 4)
- Shell: 75 x 497mm R
- Shell weight: 6.6 kg (14 lb 9 oz)
- Caliber: 75 mm (3.0 in)
- Barrels: single
- Action: Semi-automatic loading and firing
- Breech: Horizontal sliding-block
- Recoil: Hydro-pneumatic, variable
- Carriage: 2 wheel 36 by 6 in rubber tire, 90 psi
- Elevation: 0 to +85 degrees
- Traverse: 360 degrees
- Rate of fire: 15–20 rounds/minute
- Muzzle velocity: 720 m/s (2,400 ft/s)
- Effective firing range: 9,097.6 m (29,848 ft)

The Type 88 75 mm AA gun (八八式七糎野戦高射砲, Hachi-hachi-shiki nana-senti Yasen Koshahō) was an anti-aircraft gun used by the Imperial Japanese Army during the Second Sino-Japanese War and World War II. The Type 88 number was designated for the year the gun was accepted, 2588 in the Japanese imperial year calendar, or 1928 in the Gregorian calendar. It replaced the earlier Type 11 75 mm AA gun in front line combat service, and at the time was equal in performance to any of its contemporaries in Western armies and was considered capable of handling any targets the Japanese army was likely to encounter on the Asian mainland. Although it was soon overtaken by improvements in aircraft technology and was largely obsolete by 1941, it continued to be used on many fronts until the end of the war.

== History and development ==
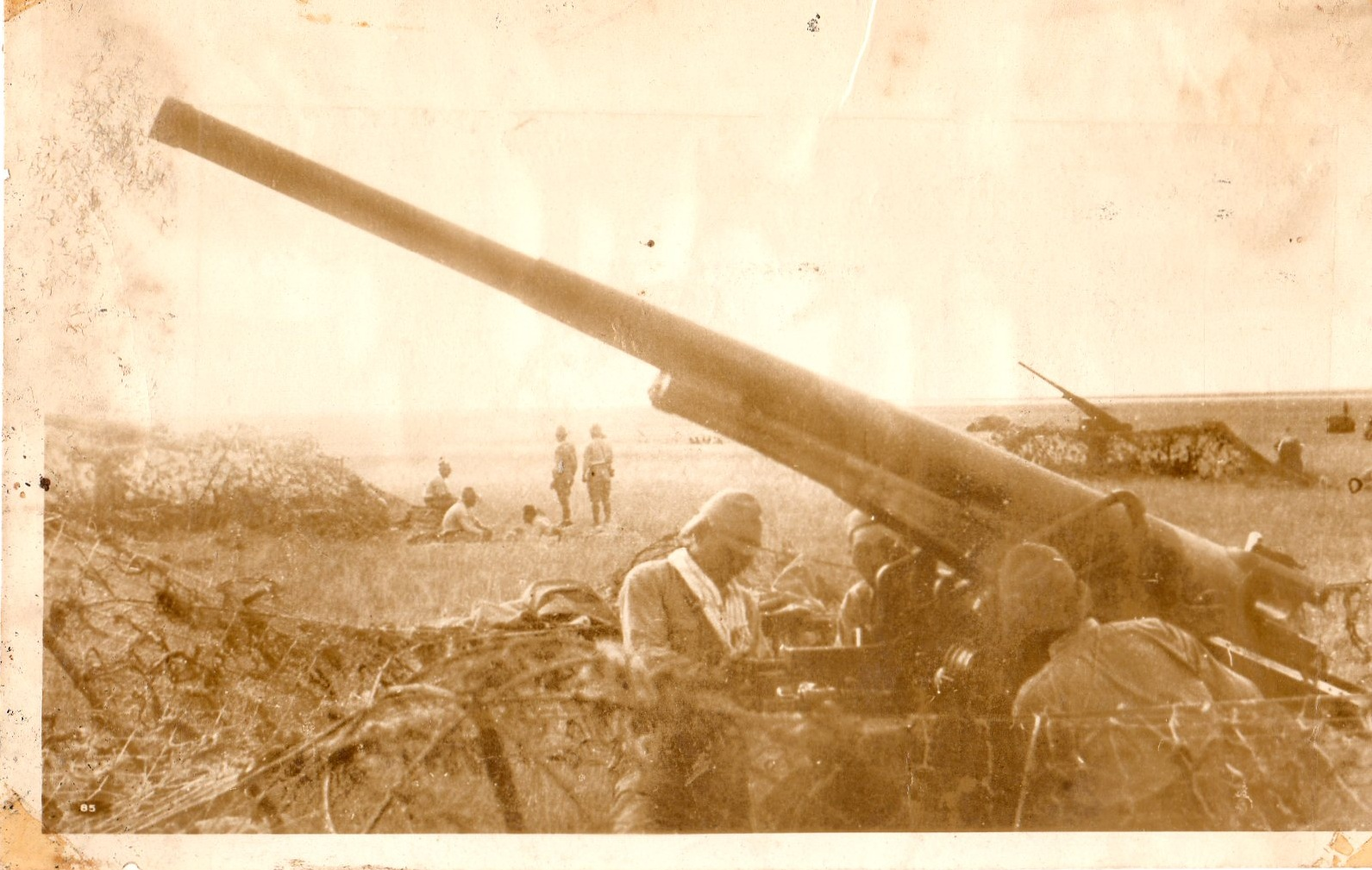
A battery of Type 88s of the 2nd AA Regiment (IJA 1st Division)

The Type 88 75 mm AA gun was based on an exhaustive evaluation by the Army Technical Bureau of several existing overseas designs, amalgamating some of the best features from each design (especially from the World War I-vintage British Vickers QF 3 inch 20 cwt AA gun) into a new, Japanese design. The Type 88's number was designated for the year the gun was accepted, 2588 in the Japanese imperial year calendar, or 1928 in the Gregorian calendar. The Type 88 was superior to the Type 11 in accuracy and range of fire.

The Type 88 75 mm AA gun entered service between 1927 and 1928, and was deployed to virtually every anti-aircraft field artillery unit as protection against medium level aircraft attacks. Although it was a difficult and expensive weapon for Japan to produce with its limited industrial infrastructure and production technology, it was produced in larger numbers than any other medium anti-aircraft weapon in the Japanese inventory. Over 2,000 units were completed by the time of the surrender of Japan.

In the early phases of World War II, Allied military intelligence initially assumed that the Japanese Type 88 was a copy of the formidable German Flak 36/37 88 mm gun due to its name. However, there is no connection between the two weapons. The confusion arose from the Japanese Army's nomenclature system. "Type 88" corresponds to the year 2588 in the Japanese imperial year, and not to the caliber of the weapon.

== Design ==
The Type 88 75 mm AA gun had a single-piece gun barrel with sliding breech, mounted on a central pedestal. The firing platform was supported by five legs, each of which (along with the central pedestal) had adjustable screwed foot for leveling. For transport each of the legs could be folded, and the barrel was also partially retractable.

== Combat record ==
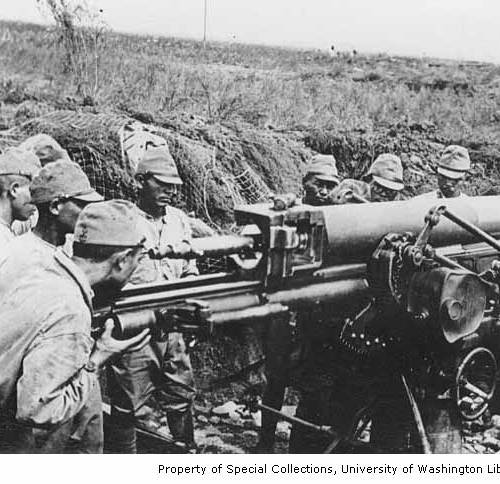
A Type 88 used as coastal artillery on Attu Island in 1943

Tactically employed in battle as a four-gun field battery, Japanese combat forces used the weapon during the invasion of Manchuria, Soviet-Japanese Border Wars and the Second Sino-Japanese War. They found the Type 88 gun's high velocity rounds were extremely effective anti-tank weapon when fired horizontally. The weapon was widely used on all fronts until the end of the war.

During both the Battle of Iwo Jima and the Battle of Okinawa it was used effectively with armor-piercing rounds against American M4 Sherman tanks. It was a coastal-defense gun. Against armor, it had the advantage of a 360 degree traverse, but it was not easily moved and so it was less effective when fired from ambush against tanks.

Towards the end of the war many of the Type 88s were withdrawn from front line combat service and sent back to the home islands, to help reinforce Japan's homeland defenses against Allied air raids and to prepare for the threat of Allied invasion. It was assigned to civil defense units in major Japanese cities, but its maximum effective vertical range of 7,250 metres (23,790 ft) meant it was ineffective against the USAAF B-29 Superfortress bombers, which could fly as high as 9,710 metres (31,860 ft). Some guns were also assigned to coastal defense batteries.

A variant was experimentally fitted to a Ki-109 bomber in an attempt to shoot down B-29 Superfortress bombers at high altitude.

North Vietnamese troops captured and used some Type 88s during the First Indochina War

=== Weapons of comparable role, performance and era ===
- British QF 3 inch 20 cwt
- United States 3-inch M1918 gun

== Ammunition ==
- Anti-aircraft
  - Type 90 HE AA pointed: complete round: 8.94 kg, projectile: 6.52 kg with Type 89 AA fuse
- High explosive
  - Type 90 HE pointed: complete round: 8.55 kg, projectile: 6.35 with Type 88 impact or Type 88 delay
- Armor-piercing
  - Type 95 APHE: complete round: 6.2 kg
- Shrapnel
- Smoke
- Incendiary
- Illumination

== See also ==
- Type 96 AA gun prime mover
