= Japanese imperial year =

Japanese calendar system

The era after the enthronement of Emperor Jimmu (神武天皇即位紀元, Jinmu-tennō sokui kigen), colloquially known as the Japanese imperial year (皇紀, kōki) or "national calendar year" is a unique calendar system in Japan. It is based on the legendary foundation of Japan by Emperor Jimmu in 660 BCE. Kōki emphasizes the long history of Japan and the Imperial dynasty. The Gregorian year 2026 is Kōki 2686.

== History ==
Kōki dating was used as early as 1872, shortly after Japan adopted the Gregorian calendar and was popular during the life of the Meiji Constitution (1890–1947). Its use was promoted by the scholars of kokugaku in the late 19th century.

The Summer Olympics and Tokyo Expo were planned as anniversary events in 1940 (Kōki 2600); but the international games were not held because of the Second Sino-Japanese War.

The Imperial Japanese Army (IJA, from 1927) and Imperial Japanese Navy (IJN, from 1929) used the Kōki system for identification. For example many Japanese names circa World War II use imperial years:

- The IJA's Type 92 battalion gun was called "ninety-two" because its design was completed in 1932, and the 2592nd year since the first Emperor of Japan was 1932 (Kōki 2592).
- Japan's wartime cipher machine was named the System 97 Printing Machine for European Characters because it entered service in 1937 (Kōki 2597).
- The Mitsubishi A6M (Navy Type 0 Carrier Fighter), colloquially called the "Zero" by allied forces, entered service in 1940 (Kōki 2600).

The Proclamation of Indonesian Independence (1945) used the imperial year (Kōki 2605).

In Japan today, the system of counting years from the reign of Emperor Jimmu is used in some judicial contexts. The existing law determining the placement of leap years is based on the Kōki years, using a formula that is effectively equivalent to that of the Gregorian calendar. Kōki is also used in Shinto context.

== See also ==
- Epoch
- Japanese calendar
- Japanese era name
