= List of surface-to-air missiles =

This is a list of surface-to-air missiles (SAMs).

== World War II ==
- Enzian – Nazi Germany
- Wasserfall – Nazi Germany
- Rheintochter – Nazi Germany
- Funryu – Empire of Japan

== Modern systems ==
=== China ===
- TY-90
- QW-3
- FN-6
- KS-1 (missile)
- HQ-9
- HQ-9A
- HQ-9B
- HHQ-9
- HQ-22
- HQ-16
- HQ-17
- HQ-17AE
- HQ-7
- HQ-10
- HQ-19
- FM-3000
- FT-2000
- HQ-15/HQ-18 (Chinese copy of S-300 missile system)

=== France ===
- R440 Crotale
- R460 SICA
- Masurca
- Roland 1
- Roland 2
- Roland 3
- Mistral 1
- Mistral 2
- Mistral 3
- VT1
- VL MICA
- Aster 15
- Aster 30

=== Germany ===
- ASRAD (Stinger, RBS-70 mk2, Igla, Mistral, Starburst missiles) land-based VSHORAD system
- ASRAD-2 land-based VSHORAD system
- IRIS-T SL
- LFK NG

=== Greece ===
- Aris AA missile system

=== India ===
- VSHORAD
- Akash
- Akash-NG
- Anant Shastra
- VL-SRSAM
- SAMAR Air Defence System
- Barak 8
  - MR-SAM
  - LR-SAM
- Project Kusha
  - MR-SAM
  - ER-SAM
  - XR-SAM
- Indian Ballistic Missile Defence Programme
  - Prithvi Air Defence
  - Advanced Air Defence
  - Prithvi Defence Vehicle
  - Prithvi Defence Vehicle Mark 2
  - AD-1 missile
  - AD-2 missile

=== Iran ===
- Arman
- Azarakhsh
- Bavar-373
- Herz-9
- Raad
- Sevom Khordad
- Mehrab
- Shahin
- Shalamche
- Misagh-1
- Misagh-2
- Majid
- Qaem
- Taer-I
- Taer-II A, B and S
- Sayyad-1
- Sadid 630
- 9 Dey
- Shahab Thaqeb
- Raad 122 mm anti helicopter rocket

=== Iraq ===
- Al Arq (missile)
- Al Hurriyah (missile)

=== Israel ===
- Arrow 2
- Arrow 3
- Barak 1
- Barak 8
- Barak MX
- David's Sling (Stunner missile)
- Iron Dome
- SPYDER (Surface-to-Air Python and Derby)

=== Italy ===
- Aspide
- CAMM-ER "Common Anti-aircraft Modular Missile - Extended Range"
- Aster 15
- Aster 30

=== Japan ===
- Type 91
- Type 03 Chu-SAM
- Type 81 Tan-SAM
- Type 93 "Closed Arrow" SAM
- Type 11 Tan-SAM Kai II

=== Myanmar ===
- GYD-1B(KS-1M) medium-range surface-to-air missile (local version of Chinese KS-1)

=== Pakistan ===
- HQ-9 / HQ-9P (China)
- HQ-16 (China)
- Anza
- RBS 70 (Sweden)

=== Poland ===
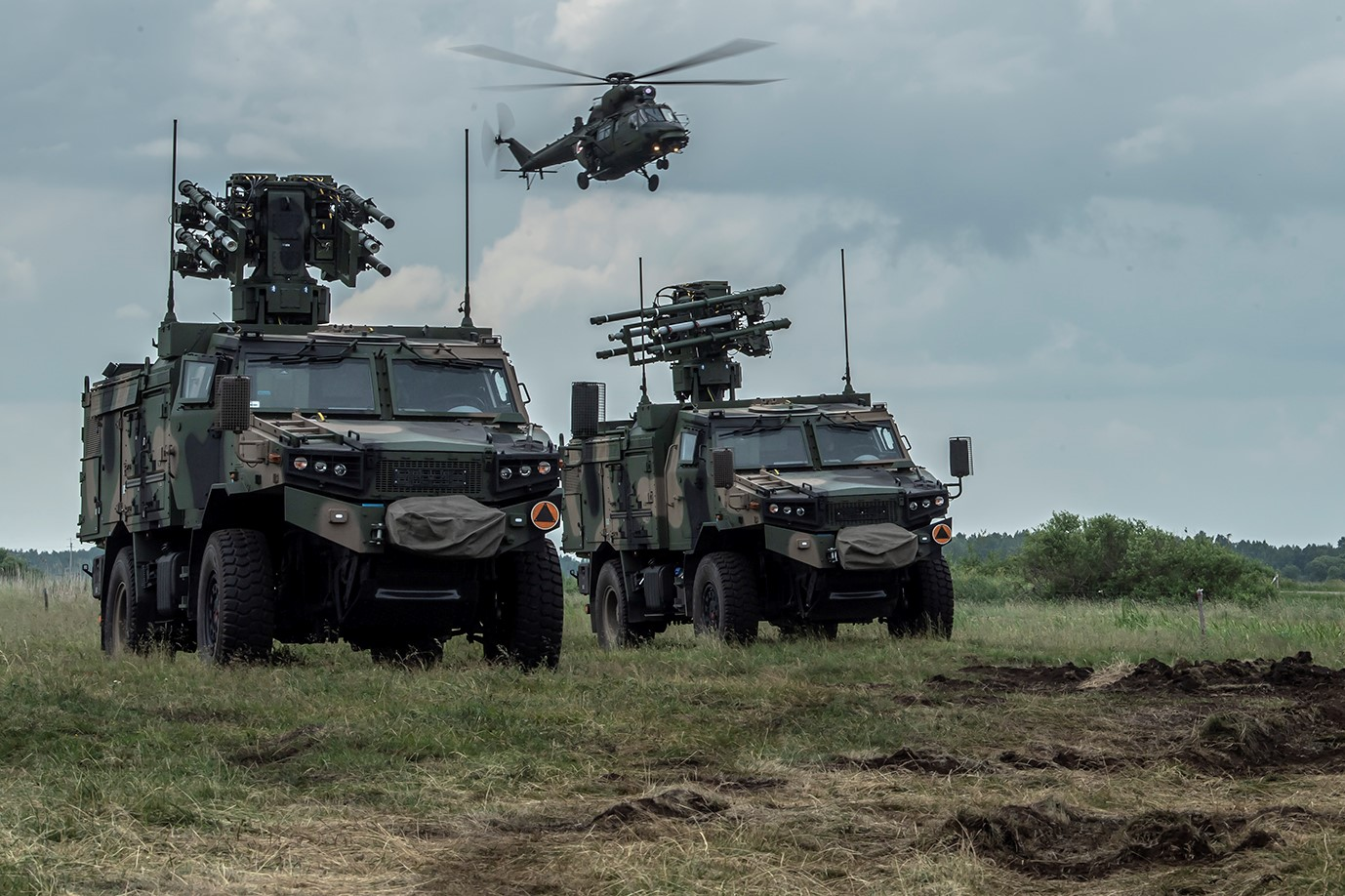
Polish SPZR Poprad

- PZR GROM
- Piorun
- Poprad (Grom, Piorun missiles) land-based VSHORAD system

=== Romania ===
- CA-94
- CA-95

=== South Africa ===
- Umkhonto
- Marlin

=== South Korea ===
- K-SAAM
- KP-SAM Chiron
- L-SAM
- M-SAM

=== Sweden ===
- MSHORAD (Bolide missile) land-based VSHORAD
- RBS-70
- RBS-23

=== Switzerland ===
- RSA
- RSC-54
- RSC-56
- RSC-57
- RSC/RSD 58
- RSE Kriens

=== Taiwan ===
- Sky Bow I
- Sky Bow II
- Sky Bow III
- Antelope air defence system
- Sea Oryx
- Sea Sword II
- Land Sword II

=== Turkey ===
- ATILGAN PMSS
- BURÇ - VSHORAD
- GÖKSUR - RAM
- GÜRZ - Very short-to-short range SAM
- GÖKDEMİR - Short-to-medium range SAM
- HİSAR - Short-to-medium range SAM
- LEVENT - RAM
- SİPER - Long-range SAM
- STEEL DOME
- Sungur MANPAD
- ZIPKIN PMADS

=== Ukraine ===
- Dnipro

=== United Kingdom ===
- Thunderbird (missile)
- Blowpipe
- Bristol Bloodhound
- Javelin
- Rapier
- Sea Cat – United Kingdom
- Sea Slug
- Sea Dart
- Sea Wolf
- Starstreak/laser
- Starburst/laser
- CAMM (missile family)

=== United States ===
- AN/TWQ-1 Avenger
- Aegis Ballistic Missile Defense System
- FIM-43 Redeye
- FIM-92 Stinger
- MIM-3 Nike Ajax
- MIM-14 Nike-Hercules
- CIM-10 BOMARC
- MIM-23 Hawk
- MIM-72 Chaparral – This is a ground-launched version of the AIM-9 Sidewinder AAM
- MIM-104 Patriot
- RIM-24 Tartar
- RIM-2 Terrier
- RIM-8 Talos
- RIM-7 Sea Sparrow (aka Basic Point Defense Missile System) (BPDMS)
- RIM-50 Typhon
- RIM-66 Standard (SM-1MR/SM-2MR)
- RIM-67 Standard (SM-1ER/SM-2ER)
- RIM-113
- RIM-116 Rolling Airframe Missile
- RIM-161 Standard Missile 3 (SM-3)
- RIM-162 ESSM
- RIM-174 Standard ERAM (SM-6)
- Terminal High Altitude Area Defense (THAAD)
- Steelfin

=== USSR/Russian Federation ===
- 2K11 Krug/SA-4 "Ganef"
- 2K12 Kub/SA-6 "Gainful"
- 2K22 Tunguska/SA-19 "Grison"/SA-N-11 (tracked gun-missile system including SA-19)
- Kashtan CIWS (naval gun-missile system including SA-19/SA-N-11)
- 9K33 Osa/SA-8 "Gecko"/SA-N-4
- 9K31 Strela-1/SA-9 "Gaskin"
- 9K32 Strela-2, a.k.a. SA-7 Grail
- 9K34 Strela-3/SA-14 "Gremlin"/SA-N-8
- 9K38 Igla/SA-16 "Gimlet"/SA-18 "Grouse"/SA-24 "Grinch"/SA-N-10/SA-N-14
- 9K333 Verba
- 9K35 Strela-10/SA-13 "Gopher"
- 9K37 Buk/SA-11 "Gadfly"/SA-17 "Grizzly"/SA-N-7/SA-N-12
- Pantsir-S1/SA-22 "Greyhound" (wheeled or tracked gun-missile system including SA-22)
- 9K330 Tor/SA-15 "Gauntlet"/SA-N-9
- 42S6 Morfey
- S-25 Berkut/SA-1 "Guild"
- S-75 Dvina/SA-2 "Guideline"/SA-N-2
- S-125 Neva/Pechora/SA-3 "Goa"/SA-N-1
- S-200 Angara/Vega/Dubna/SA-5 "Gammon"
- S-300/SA-10 "Grumble"/SA-12 "Gladiator/Giant"/SA-20 "Gargoyle"/SA-N-6
- S-300VM/SA-23 "Gladiator/Giant"
- S-350E Vityaz 50R6
- S-400 Triumf/SA-21 "Growler"
- S-500 55R6M "Triumfator-M." (As of September 16, 2021)
- M-11 Shtorm/SA-N-3 "Goblet"
- 9M337 Sosna-R

=== North Korea ===
- Pongae-5
- Pyoljji-1-2

=== Yugoslavia ===
- R-25 Vulkan

=== Multinational ===
- ASGLA (Igla missile) (German-Ukrainian) land-based VSHORAD system
- ASRAD-R (Bolide missile) (German-Swedish) land-based VSHORAD system
- ASRAD-R Naval (Bolide missile) (German-Swedish) shipboard VSHORAD system
- IRIS-T SL (German-Italian-Swedish-Greek-Norwegian-Spanish)
  - Falcon (IRIS-T SL missile) (German-Swedish-American) land-based SHORAD system
  - MGBADS (IRIS-T SL missile) (German-Danish-Norwegian) land-based SHORAD system
  - LVRBS-98 (IRIS-T SL missile) (German-Swedish) land-based SHORAD system
- IDAS (German-Norwegian-Turkish) submarine-launched anti-air/ship/land missile – also infrared-guided
- ForceSHIELD (Starstreak missile) (Franco-British) land-based VSHORAD system
- MSA (Brazilian-Emirati) shipboard SHORAD system
- MEADS (PAC-3 MSE missile) (German-Italian-American) (cancelled) land-based MRAD system
- MIM-115 Roland (Franco-German) (replaced by LFK NG)
- MIM-146 ADATS (Swiss-American)
- NASAMS (AMRAAM missile) (Norwegian-American) land-based SHORAD system
  - NASAMS 2 (AMRAAM missile) (Norwegian-American) land-based SHORAD system
  - NASAMS 3 (AMRAAM missile) (Norwegian-American) land-based SHORAD system
- PAAMS / Sea Viper (MBDA Aster missile) (Franco-British-Italian) shipboard SHORAD/MRAD system
- SAMP/T (MBDA Aster missile) (Franco-Italian) land-based SHORAD/MRAD system
- RIM-116 Rolling Airframe Missile (American-German) shipboard SHORAD system
- TLVS (PAC-3 MSE, IRIS-T SL missiles) (German-American) land-based SHORAD/MRAD system
- Barak 1 (Indian-Israeli) shipboard SHORAD system
- Barak 8 (Indian-Israeli) land-based MRAD system
