= Syrian Air Defence Force =

Former air defence branch of the Ba'athist Syrian military

Syrian Arab Air Defence Force
- قوات الدفاع الجوي العربي السوري
- Founded: 1969; 57 years ago (Note: Reorganised in 1971)
- Disbanded: December 8, 2024; 22 months ago
- Type: Air defense
- Role: Aerial warfare
- Size: 36,000
- Part of: Syrian Arab Armed Forces
- Headquarters: Damascus, Syria
- Mottos: Homeland, Honour, Sincerity (Military); Unity, Freedom, Socialism! (National)
- Colours: Blue, Green
- Anniversaries: 16 October
- Engagements: Six-Day War; War of Attrition; Black September; Yom Kippur War; Lebanese Civil War; Mountain War; 1982 Lebanon War; Gulf War; Operation Desert Storm; Syrian Civil War
- Website: www.syadf.com.sy

Commanders
- Commander-in-Chief: Bashar al-Assad (last)
- Minister of Defence: Ali Mahmoud Abbas (last)
- Chief of Air Defence Staff: Ali Tawfiq Samra (last)

Insignia
- Insignia: Military ranks of Syria

The Syrian Arab Air Defence Force (SyAADF or SAADF; Arabic: قوات الدفاع الجوي العربي السوري) was an independent command within the Ba'athist Syrian Arab Armed Forces. It was responsible for protecting the Syrian airspace against any hostile air attacks.

== Background ==
In 1987, the SyADF Command was part of the Syrian Army Command, though it also had some Syrian Air Force personnel. At the time, it had 20 brigades with about 95 surface-to-air missile batteries, and two regiments. The SyADF Command also had access to interceptor aircraft and radar facilities. Since 2017, it has been linked to a joint Russian-Syrian command.

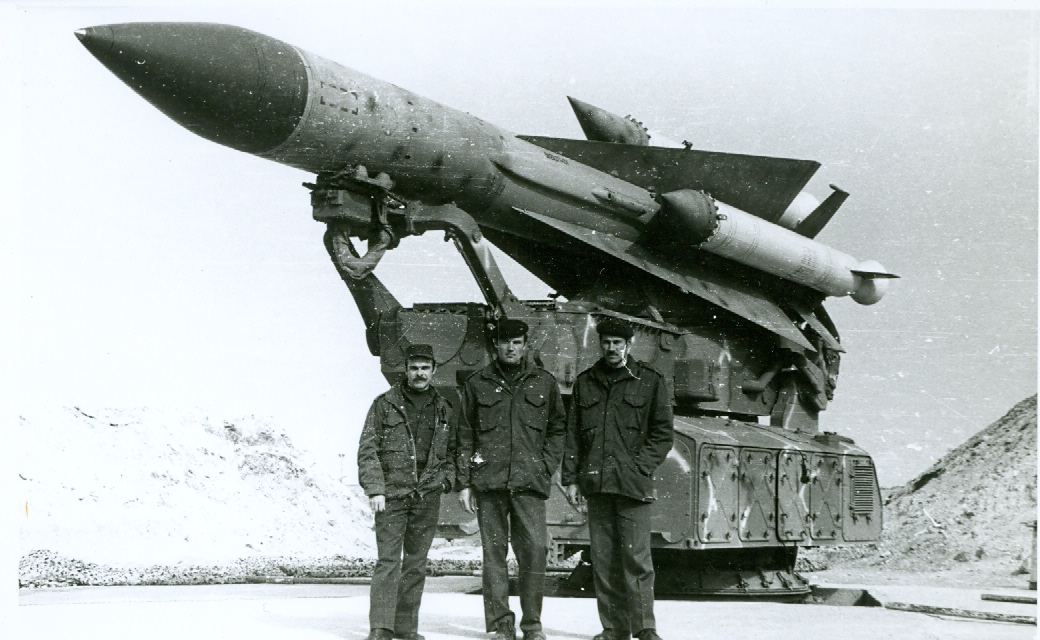
Soviet officers of the 231st Anti-Aircraft Missile Regiment at the Syrian S-200VE Vega-E complex, circa 1983.

According to Anthony H. Cordesman of the Center for Strategic and International Studies, the SyADF had 60,000 men in 2008, divided in 25 regional brigades and a total of 150 batteries spread countrywide, split into two major commands: North Zone for protection against Turkey and Iraq, and the South Zone that also covered Lebanon. 2008 assets included 11 S-75 Dvina and S-125 brigades with 60 batteries and about 468 launchers, 11 brigades with 27 batteries armed with about 195 2K12 Kub launchers and some anti-aircraft guns. Additionally, there were two regiments that had two battalions armed with two batteries each equipped with 44 S-200s, and an unspecified number of 9K33 Osa launchers. Most of these systems were obsolete and despite receiving some upgrades, they were largely vulnerable to Israeli active and passive countermeasures including anti-radiation missiles, location and identification systems, and jammers. The SyADF also had about 4,000 9K32 Strela-2 and Strela-2M man-portable air-defense systems, though Cordesman notes that most were probably operated by the Army, which also operated more advanced 9K34 Strela-3 and 9K38 Igla MANPADS.

Following the Syrian Civil War in 2011, the SyADF was reduced in size, with insurgents seizing SAM systems and radar sites. The country financial difficulties, and transfer of a large number of personnel to the Army and the National Defence Forces also took their toll. Russia provided the SyADF with more modern systems including the Buk and Pantsir. In 2012, it was visually confirmed that the 9K35 Strela-10 was in service, while most 9K31 Strela-1 batteries were placed in storage. An unknown number of S-300 system were delivered to Syria in 2018. A large number of Iranian Air Defence systems were delivered to the country in 2021: Mersad, Khordad-3 and Khordad-15 systems.

The Syrian early warning system comprises Long Track; P-12 Spoon Rest; P-14 Tall King; H-15 Flat Face; P-18 Spoon Rest; P-19; P-30 Big Mesh; P-35 Bar Lock; P-80 Back Net; YLC-6 Radar; JY-27; JYL-1; PRV-13; PRV-16 Thin Skin; Alborz mobile and static radar sites throughout Syria.

In the 1980s, the SyADF operated 50 MiG-25 and MiG-25R (NATO reporting name: "Foxbat") and 310 MiG-21MF/S/U (NATO reporting name: "Fishbed") interceptors.

It was presumably dissolved after the fall of the Assad regime in December 2024.

== Former structure and organization ==
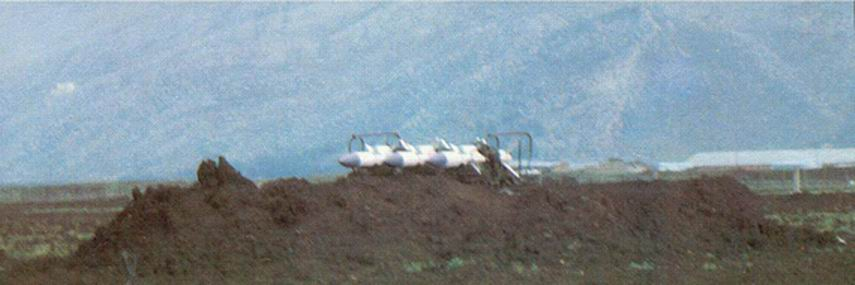
Part of a Syrian 2K12 Kub ground-to-air missile site built near the Beirut-Damascus highway and overlooking the Bekaa Valley, in early 1982 during the 1982 Lebanon War.

- 40,000 active personnel
- 15,000 reserve personnel
- Air Defence Division HQ
  - 33 Air Defence Brigades
    - 150 Air Defence Batteries
      - 25 defence teams (130 batteries)
- Including:
- Self-propelled
  - 62 batteries:
    - 11 teams - 27 batteries - SA-6 Gainful (PU SAM 2K12 Square);
    - 14 Battery - SA-8 Gecko (PU SAM 9K33 Osa);
    - 12 Battery - SA-22 Greyhound (96K6 Pantsyr S1E);
    - 9 Battery - Buk-M2
- Towed
  - 11 teams - 60 batteries with SA-2 Guideline (CP-75 Dvina / S-75M Volga) and SA-3 Goa (S-125 Neva / S-125M Pechora) (Being upgraded);
- Two SAM regiments with SA-5 Gammon(in each brigade to 2 divisions for 2 batteries each).
  - Four SAM battalions
    - Eight Static/Shelter SAM batteries
- Two independent SAM Regiments
  - Four SAM batteries with SA-8

== Former inventory ==
The Israeli military estimated that 86% of the SyADF systems were destroyed during the Israeli invasion after the fall of the Ba'athist-led regime.

=== Towed and self-propelled air defence systems ===
Gear	Country of origin	In service	Type	Comments
Khordad-3	Iran	Unknown	Mid- Range Mobile SAM	Taer 2 and Sayad missile. Delivered between 2019 and 2022.
Khordad-15	Iran	Unknown	Long Range Mobile SAM	Sayyad-3 missile. Delivered between 2019 and 2021.
Mersad	Iran	Unknown	Short- to Mid- Range Mobile SAM	Shahin missile. Delivered between 2019 and 2021.
Buk-M2E Missile System	Russia	Up to 40 + 20 Buk-M1-2s.	Mid-Range Mobile SAM	Up to 36 believed to be delivered before 2011. Additional units delivered in 2018.
Buk-M1-2 Missile System	Soviet Union	20	Mid-Range Mobile SAM	Additional delivered in 2011.
Tor-M1 Missile System	Russia	N/A	Short-Range Mobile SAM	Modified Tor-M1 "Dezful" variant. Supplied by Iran in 2018.
Pantsir S-1	Russia	57+ (+10 Pantsir S-2)	Short-Range Mobile SAM	Pantsir S-1 and S-2(E) variants. 40 delivered up until 2017. Additional units delivered in 2018. One unit destroyed by an Israeli airstrike in 2018. Two more destroyed in an Israeli air strike in January 2019.
Strela-10	Soviet Union	35	Short-Range Mobile SAM	
Strela-1	Soviet Union	20	Short-Range Mobile SAM	
9K33 Osa	Soviet Union	50	Short-Range Mobile SAM	60 delivered. Several lost in Syria Civil War.
2K12 Kub	Soviet Union	Up to 150	Mid-Range Mobile SAM	195 at the start of 2012. Some units out of service due to partial replacement by Buk-M2.
S-300 Missile System	Russia	24	Long Range Mobile SAM	24 delivered in October 2018. PMU-2 Favorit variant. In 2022, it was removed from Syria.
S-200	Soviet Union	Up to 44	Long-Range Static SAM	Modified by CERS. Destroyed an Israeli F-16 on 10 February 2018. Destroyed a Russian cargo Il-20 on 17 September 2018.
S-125 Pechora	Soviet Union; Russia	148 + 30 2M	Mid-Range Static SAM	Additional 2M's may be delivered in 2023.
S-75 Dvina	Soviet Union; Russia	Up to 300 (S-75 Volga, S-75M Volga variant obr. 1995)	Mid-Range Static SAM	In service, mainly deployed against UAVs.

=== Electronic warfare systems ===
Name	Type	Quantity	Origin	Photo	Notes
Groza-S	Mobile electronic countermeasure system	N/A	Belarus		Supplied by Belarus in 2018.

== Combat history ==
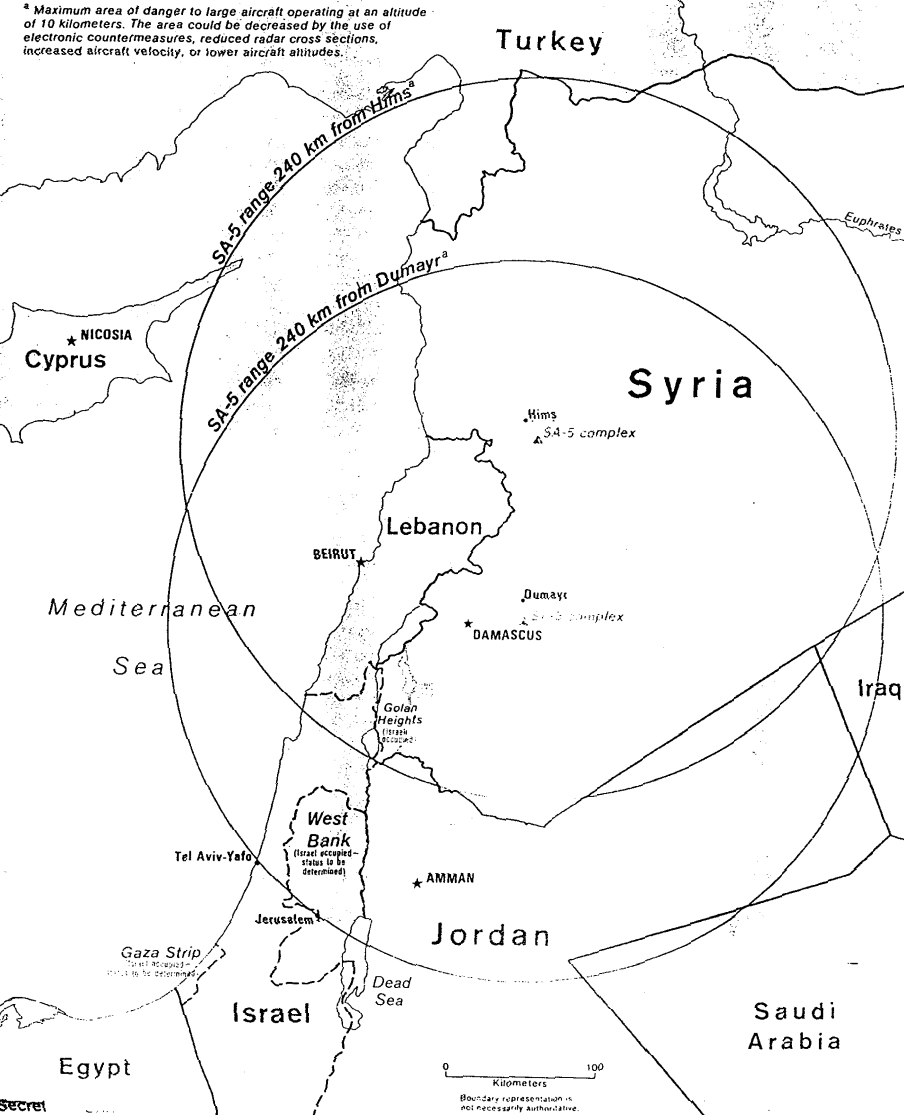
Syrian SA-5 Air Defence system in 1984

In October 1973, the Syrian Air Defence Force (SyADF) shot down numerous Israeli warplanes using mostly the 2K12 Kub (SA-6) SAMs.

In 1982, Israel claimed that 19 of 20 batteries, consisting of five launchers per battery, each launcher carrying three SA-6 missiles, were wiped out in Operation Mole Cricket 19, and the SyADF claimed to have shot down 43 Israeli warplanes over Lebanon in the same year.

On 22 June 2012, the Syrian Air Defence Force shot down a Turkish McDonnell Douglas F-4 Phantom II reconnaissance jet. The jet's pilots were killed; both Turkish and Syrian forces searched for them before recovering their bodies in early July. The incident greatly escalated the tensions between Turkey and Syria.

In mid-November 2013, Turkish sources claimed the SyADF targeted, for ten seconds, three Turkish F-16 fighters that were flying near Dörtyol, over southern Hatay province after deploying from the Incirlik and Merzifon airbases. The incident came after a Turkish F-16 shot down a Syrian Mi-17 helicopter on September 16 after Turkey claimed it crossed into Turkish airspace in the same area.

On 17 March 2015, a US MQ-1 Predator drone was shot down by a Syrian S-125 missile.

On 13 September 2016, the Syrian Army claimed to have downed an Israeli warplane and a drone after an attack on Quneitra province. The Israel defence Forces denied any such loss.

On 17 March 2017, the Syrian Armed Forces claimed to have downed an Israeli warplane after an attack on military site near Palmyra. The Israel defence Forces denied any such loss.

On February 10, 2018, Israel launched air strikes against targets in Syria with eight fighter aircraft as retaliation for a UAV incursion into the airspace of the Israeli-occupied Golan Heights earlier in the day. Syrian Air Defences succeeded in shooting down one of the Israeli jets, an F-16I Sufa, with an S-200 missile. The jet crashed in the Jezreel Valley, near Harduf. Both the pilot and the navigator managed to eject.

On April 14, 2018, the Syrian Air Defences claimed to repel massive US, British and French missile strike on Syrian military facilities. Three civilians were injured, among civilians and military none. The SyADF used 112 anti-aircraft missiles, hitting 71 targets out of 103 (according to the Russian MoD). To repel the attack, the following complexes were used: S-125, S-200, Buk, Kub, Osa, Strela-10 and Pantsir S-1.

On the night of May 10, 2018, Israel launched a large scale air attack on multiple, alleged Iranian targets in Syria. After being engaged by the SyADF, the Israeli aircraft attacked and destroyed a Pantsir-S1 launcher, as well as several other anti-aircraft systems (SA5, SA2, SA22, SA17) .

On September 17, 2018, four Israeli F-16s engaged targets in the Syrian port city of Latakia, to which Syrian Air Defences responded. During the Israeli attack, a Russian Il-20 aircraft was mistakenly destroyed by an S-200 missile launched by the SyADF. All fifteen crewmembers of the Il-20 died as a result. Russian military claimed, Israeli Air Force pilots took shelter behind the IL-20, this exposing the Russian aircraft to the Syrian missile attack.

In February and March 2020, Turkey Air force F-16 fighters and combat UAVs launched airstrikes on Syrian Army positions in Greater Idlib region in retaliation for the Balyun Airstrike. Syrian Air Defence Forces stated they succeeded in shooting down 13 Turkish combat UAVs, including 7 Bayraktar TB2 and 6 TAI Anka.

On July 19, 2021, four F-16 fighter jets of the Israeli Air Force entered Syria's airspace via the US-controlled al-Tanf zone and fired eight guided missiles at an area southeast of Syria's Aleppo. Vadim Kulit, deputy chief of the Russian Center for Reconciliation of the Opposing Parties in Syria, claimed that seven missiles were downed by the Russian-made Pantsir-S and Buk-M2 systems of the Syrian Air Defence Forces.

In the evening of 27 July 2021, a drone was launched by militants from the Kafer-Khattar community in the Idlib Province. The militant drone was downed over the Hama Province by the Syrian Air Defence who used a Russia-produced Pantsir-S missile system, Kulit claimed the next day. Syrian Air Defence forces shot down 22 missiles fired by Israel into Syria using Russian-made Buk-M2E and Pantsir-S systems, Rear Adm. Vadim Kulit said on 20 August 2021.

Syrian Air Defence forces shot down twenty-one out of twenty-four missiles fired by Israel into Syria using Russian-made Buk-M2E and Pantsir-S systems, Rear Adm. Vadim Kulit said on September 3, 2021. Syrian Air Defence forces shot down 8 out of 12 missiles fired by Israel in Syria using Russian-made Pantsir-S systems, Rear Adm. Vadim Kulit said on 08.10.2021. Syrian Air Defence forces shot down ten out of twelve missiles fired by Israel into Syria using Russian-made Buk-M2E and Pantsir-S systems, Rear Adm. Vadim Kulit said on November 24, 2021.

On 13 May 2022, the Israeli Air Force launched attacks on SAA positions on Masyaf killing 5 people including one civilian, the attack destroyed one Pantsir-S1 system. On 25 August and 17 September 2022, new attacks were reportedly partly repelled by Syrian Pantsir-S1, Buk-M2E and S-75 systems.

On December 25, 2023, the Israeli Air Force carried out an airstrike in the Sayyida Zeinab area, southeast of Damascus, resulting in the killing of Razi Mousavi, the Iranian IRGC officer in Syria. The Syrian Air Defence Force was unsuccessful in intercepting the missile.

After the fall of the Assad regime, Israel conducted air strikes on strategic targets in Syria, eliminating its air defence and strategic surface-to-air missiles as Israel saw Syrian air defence systems as one of the most powerful in the Middle East.

Since 2025, Turkey has been helping Syria with rebuilding it's air force. The new syrian government has also shown interest in russian systems such as the S-400 . Despite this, as of late 2026, Syria has no real air defense network.
