= Ya Zahra air defense system =

Ya Zahra (Air defense system)
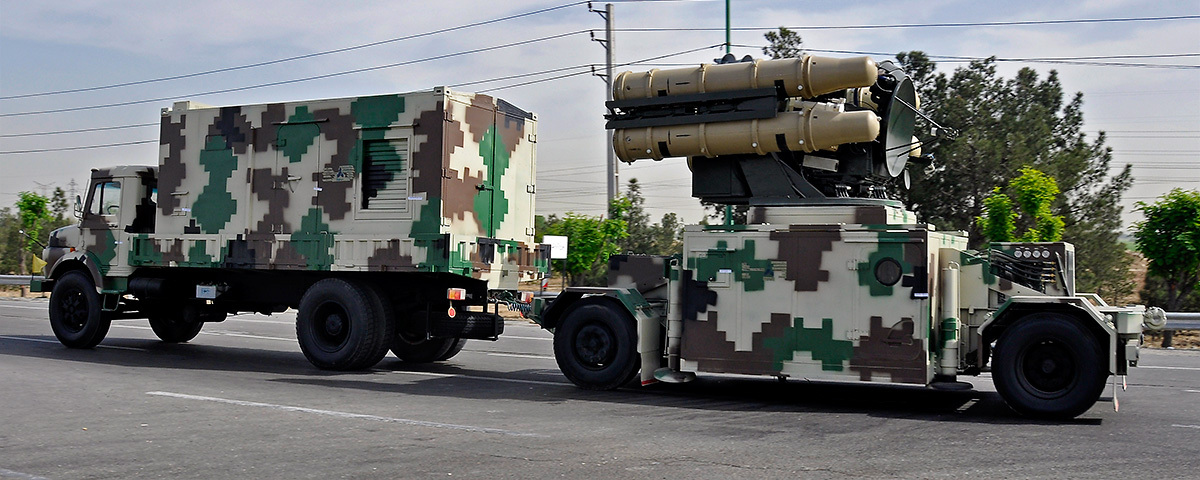
- Ya Zahra launcher and command vehicle
- Type: Light, mobile air defense system
- Place of origin: Iran

Service history
- In service: 2013–present
- Used by: Islamic Republic of Iran Air Defense Force

Production history
- Produced: 2013–present

Specifications
- Width: 2.2m
- Height: 1.5m
- Propellant: Solid

Ya Zahra (Persian: یا زهراء, O Zahra) is an Iranian unlicensed copy of the Chinese HQ-7 missile, itself an unlicensed copy of the French Crotale missile short-range air defense system. The system entered production in 2013.

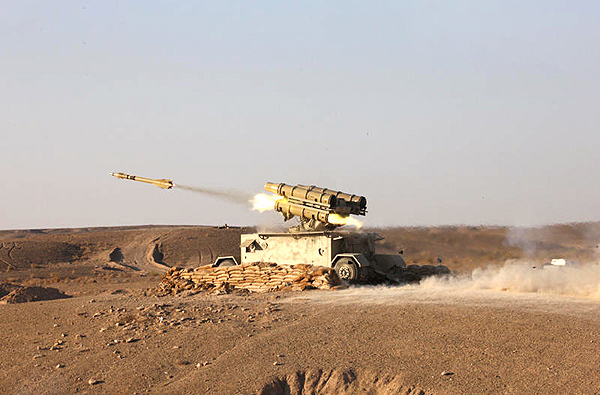
Shooting exercise in 2010.

The Ya Zahra differs from Iran's Raad in being a short-range air defense system. Iranian sources say it is able to form a missile defense network. This system was successfully tested in "Defenders of Velayat Skies 4" air defense drills. Iranian sources claim the Ya Zahra is more advanced than the French Crotale.

Mass production of the Ya Zahra air defense system officially began on January 27, 2013.

The 3rd generation of the Ya Zahra system, Ya Zahra-3, has electo-optical equipment that reportedly helps to detect and track targets when the battlefield is affected by heavy jamming. Also Ya Zahra has a full mobile version named Herz-9.

The missile used by the system is the Shahab Thaqeb. It has been under development since at least 2011.

External media

Images
- Ya Zahra ADS fires a missile

Video
- Ya Zahra firing against target
- Ya Zahra factory

== Comparable SAMs ==
- Crotale
- HQ-7

== See also ==
- Bavar 373
- Mersad
- Sayyad-2
