= Pyoljji-1-2 =

North Korean surface-to-air missile

- Place of origin: North Korea

Service history
- Used by: Korean People's Army Air and Anti-Air Force

Production history
- Manufacturer: North Korea
- Produced: 2020–present
- Variants: Standard; Extended

Specifications
- Warhead: possibly direct hit weapon
- Propellant: solid fuel
- Operational range: 400–600 km (250–370 mi) (estimated)
- Guidance system: unknown
- Launch platform: 2-axle four canister trailer TEL
- Transport: 3-axle truck

The Pyoljji-1-2 (Korean: 《별찌-1-2》형; lit. Meteor-1-2), formerly referred to as Pongae-6 (번개-6; lit. Lightning-6) is a North Korean two-stage surface-to-air missile that was first tested on 30 September 2021. The system was first shown in the 75th anniversary of the Workers' Party of Korea parade, where it was possibly confused with a long-range cruise missile system. The new weapons system is likely to succeed the Pongae-5, which was similar in design to the S-300 series of anti-aircraft missiles, specifically either the S-300PMU1 or PMU2.

External images from KCNA
- KCNA image of the test firing
- KCNA image of the system on parade

== Design ==
=== History ===
Prior to the development of the Pongae-5 system, the anti-aircraft missile systems of North Korea were largely older Soviet types, such as the S-75, S-125 and the S-200. These weapons have become dated, although the S-200 still has merits due to its long range of 300 km. The appearance of the Pongae-5 was a significant development, as it introduced a significantly more modern system, similar to the S-300. With the newer Flap Lid radar being introduced along with it, North Korean air defence started posing a much more significant threat.

According to Seoul Broadcasting System reporter Kim Tae-hoon, the Pyoljji-1-2 system was apparently first shown on 3 May 2012 to Kim Jong Un as Pongae-6 when he visited the command headquarters of the Korean People's Army Air and Anti-Air Force. However, the system only became definite after the system was displayed in the 2020 75th anniversary of the WPK parade.

=== Transporter erector launcher ===
Images from the test-fires and parades suggest that the system is based on a two-axle TEL connected as a trailer to a three-axle truck. The truck bears a close resemblance to the M1705 truck, which pulls the THAAD system.

=== Missile ===
The solid fuel missile used in the system is completely unlike the previous Pongae-5 system, as it is fitted with a "double-impulse flight engine", where the missile has two stages, and burns the two stages sequentially. The layout of the missile appears to be somewhat similar to the S-125 system, as that is also a two-stage missile. Nonetheless, the first stage, or booster is longer, and the control surfaces on both stages are different to the S-125 and is unique in its configuration, although overall it might be based on the mature design. However, the missile also has resemblances to the Israeli David's Sling, due to the two-stage layout while it is less advanced, as it lacks the infrared probes on it. At the "Self-defence 2021" exhibition, two missiles were displayed, one with a longer booster/first stage stage, identified by the longer cable raceway possibly as an option between range. It also allowed a closer look, where it appeared that on the second stage, there are two sets of movable fins along with a set of fixed fins. It was also mentioned that the missile had 'twin rudder control', though the meaning of this is not clear, other than that it has a set of control surfaces on both stages.

Various sources have compared the missile as being similar in capabilities to the S-400 or the THAAD, and South Korean sources speculated that the missile might have been based on reverse engineered S-400 missiles or otherwise with technology smuggled from Russia or China, but nonetheless also possible that designs of S-400 systems sold to other countries were studied by North Korean research teams. The development of the missile may hamper South Korean efforts to hamper the nuclear and strategic missile capability if war breaks out, and could 'the security balance between the two Koreas may be shaken". According to South Korean defence officials, while North Korean strategic missile defence has been rapidly improving by developing models with similarities to Russian and Chinese systems, they are not yet likely able to defeat a South Korean and US strike.

The missile is also claimed to have an estimated range of 400–600 km (250–370 mi) and has a direct hit weapon.

=== Radar ===
A radar, which appeared similar to the one which participated in the test firing of the Pongae-5, was also seen in the background of the test firing on September 30, 2021. The radar appears to be fitted with a large radar behind the truck cabin, and a smaller one on top of the cabin, although it is not known if the smaller one has the ability to rotate.

== List of tests ==
| Attempt | Date | Location | Pre-launch announcement / detection | Outcome | Additional notes |
|---|---|---|---|---|---|
| 1 | 30 September 2021 | Unknown | None | Success | Like with the earlier cruise missile launch on September 13 and 14, the launch was not detected at all, and instead news of this launch was from KCNA. Pak Jong-chon oversaw the test, and Kim Jong Un did not attend. |
| 2 | Early November 2022 | Unknown | None | Success | |
| 3 | 2 February 2024 | Unknown | None | Success | North Korea did not mention the missile's name. |
| 4 | 19 April 2024 | Unknown | None | Success | North Korea confirmed the "Pyoljji-1-2" designation. A Hwasal-1 Ra-3 missile was also tested along with Pyoljji-1-2 in this test. |

== See also ==
- S-400 missile system
- S-500 missile system
- David's Sling
