= Tabas (air defense system) =

Iranian air defense system

Tabas/طبس
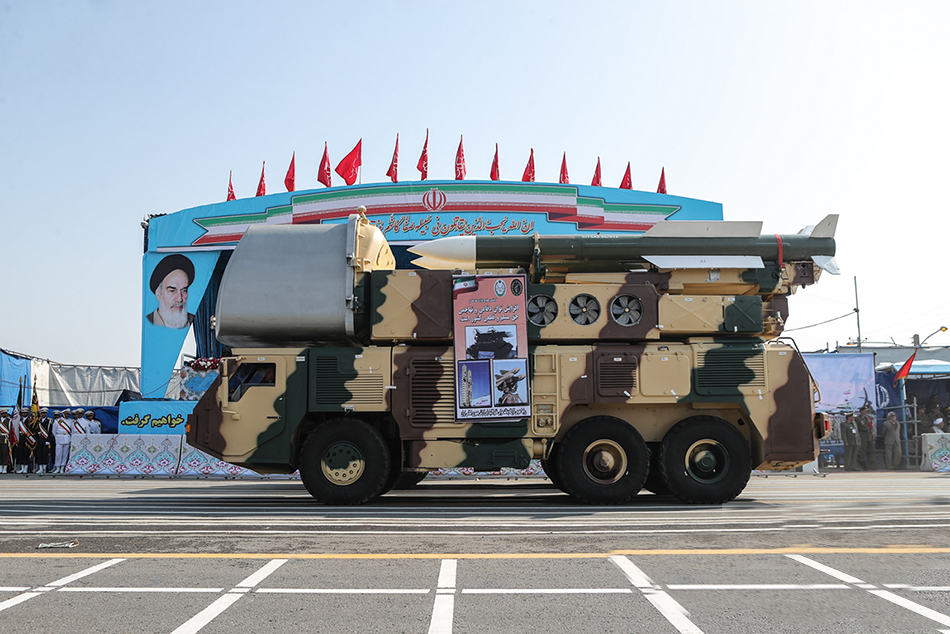
- Type: air defense system
- Place of origin: Iran

Service history
- In service: 2014–present
- Used by: Islamic Republic of Iran Air Defense Force

Specifications
- Main armament: Taer-2A
- Secondary armament: Sayyad-2
- Engine: IVECO diesel
- Operational range: 75 km
- Flight ceiling: 25 km

The Tabas (Persian: طبس) missile system is an Iranian medium range road-mobile aerial defense system that was first revealed on 11 May 2014. It is believed to be another version of the Ra'ad air defense system along with Sevom Khordad. The name of the air defense system refers to Operation Eagle Claw which took place at Tabas and hence the name of the missile system.

== Characteristics ==
The missile system resembles the Soviet Buk-M1 missile system due to its less sophisticated radar system. The speed of its TELAR is estimated to be 65 km/h; each vehicle can carry 3 missiles. It is also likely that the system can intercept ballistic missiles, cruise missiles, anti-radiation missiles, smart bombs and UAVs. Each Tabas battery consists of one TELAR and two TELs hence each battery carries 9 missiles. Each battalion consists of four batteries and hence can engage multiple targets simultaneously. Each battalion is also equipped with a Bashir S-band 3-D Phased array radar that extends its detection range up to 350 km.
