= Raad (air defense system) =

Raad air defence system
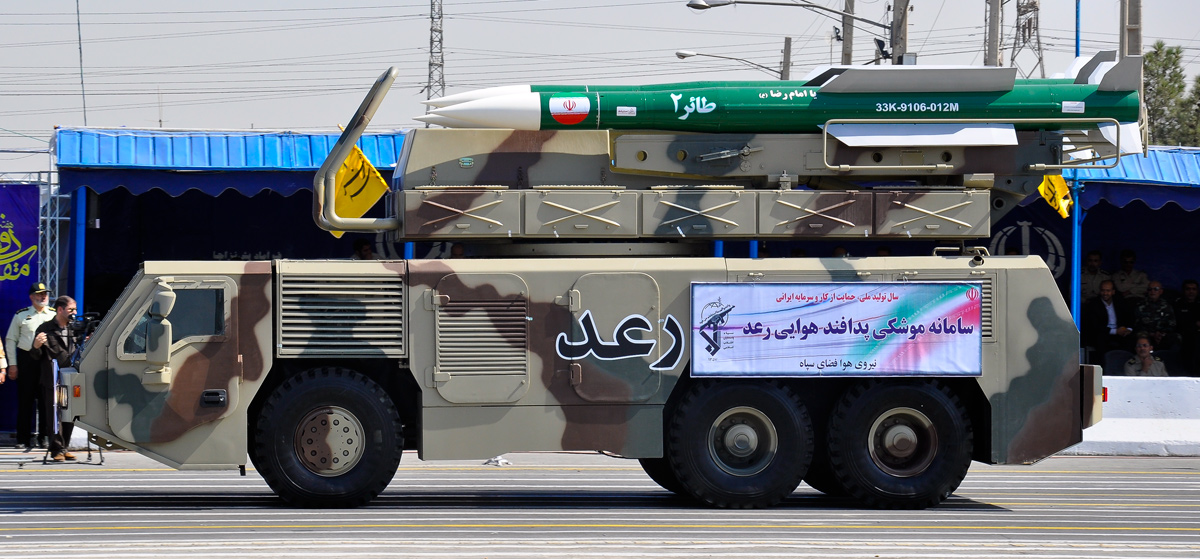
- Raad air defense system
- Type: Air defense system
- Place of origin: Iran

Service history
- Used by: IRGC AF

Production history
- Designer: IRGC Aerospace Force
- Designed: 2012
- Produced: Under Development
- Variants: Ra'ad-1; Ra'ad-2; 3rd Khordad; Tabas

Specifications
- Main armament: 3x Taer-2 surface to air missiles (105km); 3x Sayyad-2 surface to air missile (75km)
- Engine: Solid Fuel Rocket
- Operational range: 105 km
- Flight altitude: 25,000 to 27,000 m
- Launch platform: Zolfaghar Wheeled TEL

Raad or Ra'd (Persian: رعد 'thunder') is an Iranian modern aerial defence system deployed in September 2012.The system is designed to enhance Iran's capabilities in terms of defense, and as a partner to Bavar 373 air defense system. According to Fars news agency, the Raad is designed to confront fighter jets, cruise missiles, smart bombs, helicopters and drones. The system is also designed specially for US fighters. The system is equipped with "Taer" (Bird) missiles, which can trace and hit targets in ranges up to 105 km and at altitudes from 25 to 27 km (80,000 feet), Ra'd is a mid-range radar system and air defense system.

== History ==
During Velayat 91 maneuvers in December 2012 the Iranian Navy successfully tested the Raad Air Defense System but it is not clear if the Raad missile tested in Iranian Navy is the same one as the Taer-2 missile of Raad system designed by the IRGC Aerospace Force and it may be only a similarity between a surface to air missile and an air defense system.

In May 2014 the Aerospace Force of the Islamic Revolutionary Guard Corps (IRGC-AF) unveiled four different configuration of Raad air defense system: 3rd Khordad TELAR(Transporter erector launcher and radar) which is equipped with Taer-2B missiles, a phased-array radar and is able to control two launchers; Tabas TELAR which features a white dome radar and uses Taer-2A missiles; Alam al hoda launcher is equipped with electro-optical tracking systems; and Raad-2 which has a new wheeled launcher and uses electro-optical systems on separate vehicles with a range of 80 km.

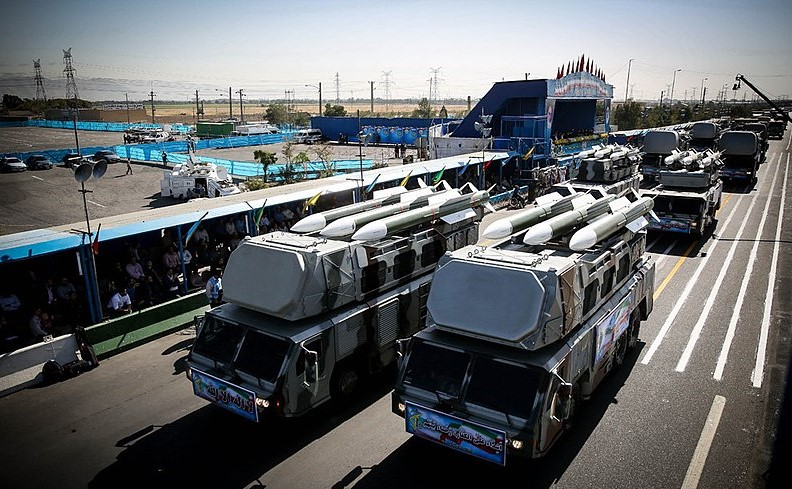
Several configurations of the Raad SAM system are seen during a parade in Tehran in 2016. The lead two vehicles are 3 Khordad systems.

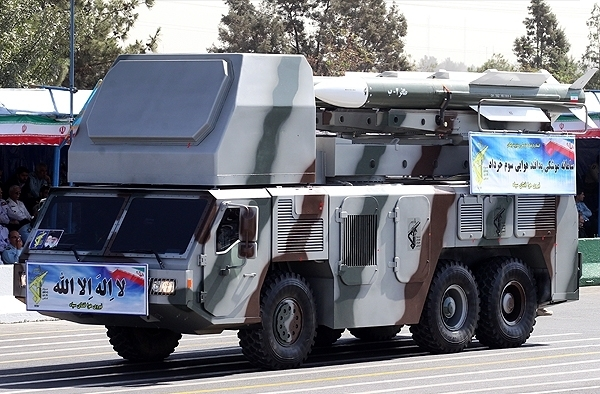
A 3rd Khordad air defense battalion comprises 4× transporter erector launcher and radar TELAR vehicles,

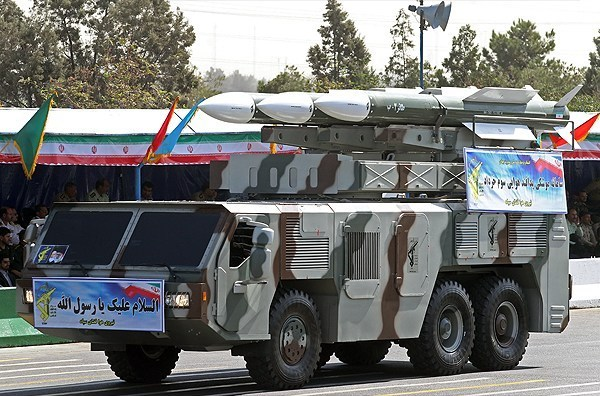
and 8× TEL.

In the IRGC-AF exhibition in May 2014 announced that new versions of 3rd Khordad SAM system will reach to ranges about 100 and 200 km with new missiles. The 3rd Khordad (3rd of Khordad) system can engage with four targets and guide two missiles to each of them simultaneously with the aid of its phased array radar that has 1700 elements. Jane's describes the 3rd Khordad as "a highly capable surface-to-air missile (SAM) system."

Iran has also developed another SAM system named RAAD-1 with TAER-1 missiles.

=== Downing of an American drone ===
On 19 June 2019, an American RQ-4 Global Hawk UAV was shot down by an Iranian surface-to-air missile while over the Strait of Hormuz. Iranian officials said the drone was shot down by a 3rd Khordad medium-range SAM system, which is part of the Raad family of air defense systems.

The following day Iran said the US drone had violated Iranian airspace, while the United States said that it had been in international airspace eighteen nautical miles (34 km) away from Iran.

== See also ==
- Mersad
- Sayyad-2
- Ya Zahra air defense system
- Buk missile system
- Iron Dome
- Ya Zahra air defense system
- Defense industry of Iran
