= Khordad 15 (air defense system) =

Khordad-15
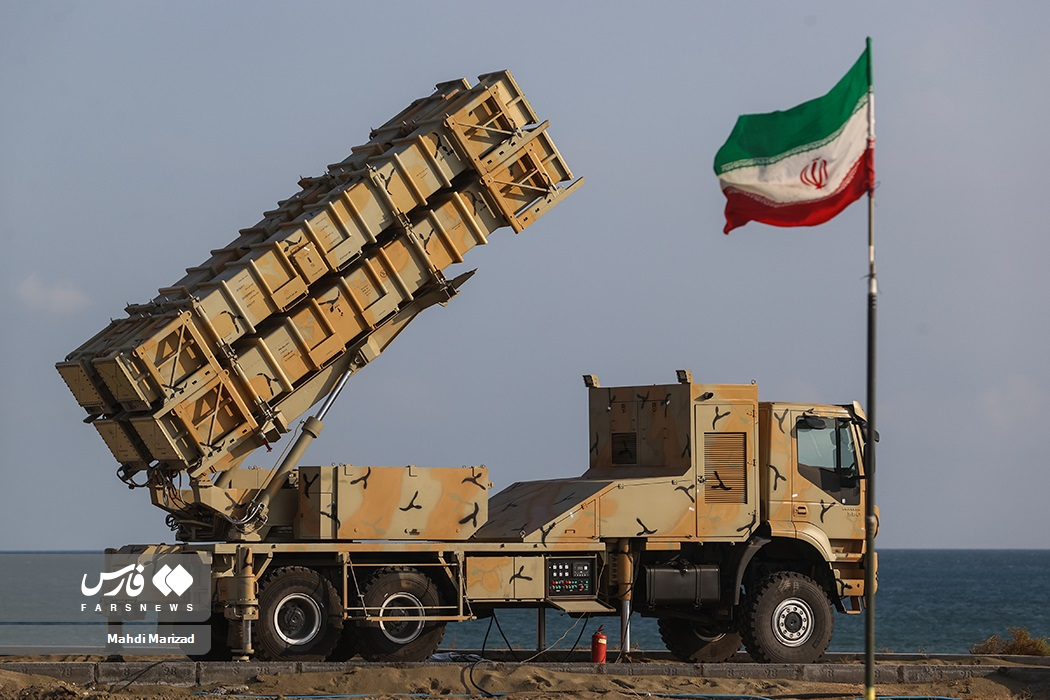
- Type: SAM system
- Place of origin: Iran

Service history
- In service: 2019–present
- Used by: Iran

Production history
- Designer: Iran Aviation Industries Organization
- Manufacturer: Iran Aviation Industries Organization
- Produced: 2019–present
- Variants: Joshan

Specifications

The Khordad 15 (Persian: پانزده خرداد) is an Iranian designed and built surface-to-air missile (SAM) system. The system was unveiled to the public on 9 June 2019 in an address made by Iranian Defence Minister Amir Hatami in Tehran, Iran. The system was developed by the Iran Aviation Industries Organization (IAIO).it is capable of detecting and intercepting fighter jets, stealth targets, unmanned combat aerial vehicles (UCAVs), and cruise missiles. It operates in conjunction with Sayyad-3 missiles. The surface-to-air missile system was developed in order to counter missiles and other aerial threats presented by the presence of extra-regional forces at military bases in countries around Iran. It was unveiled amid escalating tensions with the United States and Europe's failing attempts at upholding its commitments to the 2015 Iran nuclear deal.

== Name ==
The Khordad 15 air defense system is named in honor of the 1963 demonstrations in Iran, which according to the Iranian calendar is known as the 15 Khordad uprising. It was a series of protests in Iran against the arrest of Ayatollah Ruhollah Khomeini after his denouncement of Iranian Shah Mohammad Reza Pahlavi and Israel. The Shah's regime was taken by surprise by the massive public demonstrations of support and it was these events which established the power of religious opposition to the Shah, and Khomeini as a major political and religious leader.

== Design ==
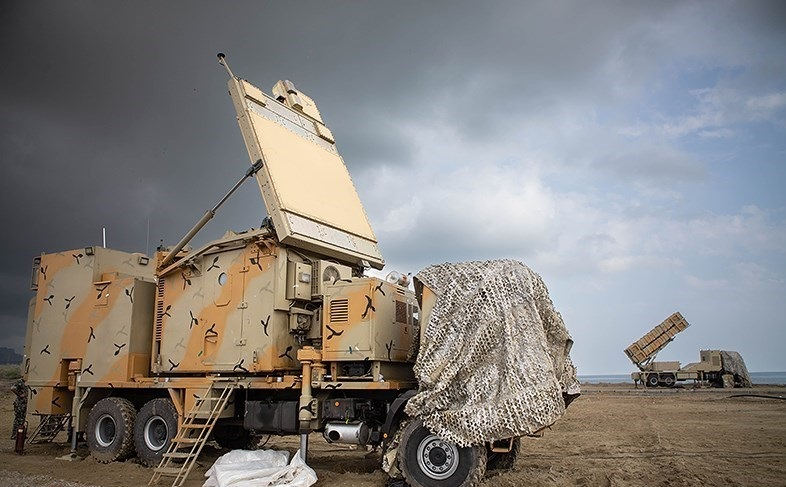
Khordad 15 PESA radar

The Khordad 15 air defense system was designed and is manufactured by the Iran Aviation Industries Organization (IAIO). The system is equipped with a passive electronically scanned array radar and independent launch pads which work in conjunction to detect, intercept and destroy potential threats. The setup of the SAM system includes two military trucks. One with a rotating, rectangular launcher on the bed which contains four missile canisters in two rows of two canisters each but is capable of utilizing only one row of two canisters. Another with a mounted rotating slab-shaped radar antenna.

== Capabilities ==
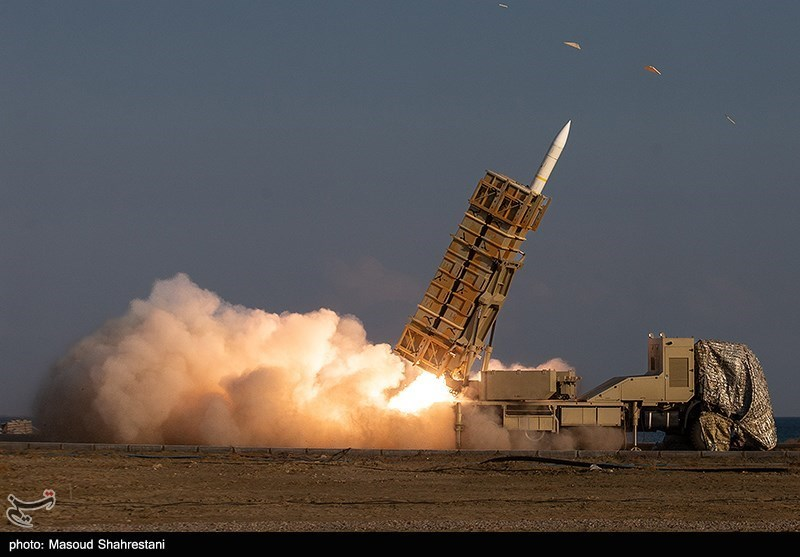
Khordad 15 firing

The Khordad 15 is capable of detecting, intercepting, and destroying six targets simultaneously. The system is capable of detecting fighter jets, cruise missiles and unmanned combat aerial vehicles (UCAV) from 150 kilometres (93 mi) away and is able to track them within a range of 120 kilometres (75 mi) and the Sayyad-3 missile, used by the SAM system, has a range of 200 kilometres (120 mi). The system can also detect stealth targets from a distance of 85 kilometres (53 mi) and can intercept and destroy them within a range of 45 kilometres (28 mi).

== Operational History ==
=== October 2024 Israeli strikes on Iran ===
The Israeli army released a video of an October 2024 strike on a claimed Iranian Khordad 15 air-defense system near Bandar Mahshahr, Khuzestan in Iran.

== Operators ==
=== Current ===
- Iran: At least 9 SAM launchers have been seen, more likely in service.

== See also ==
- Defense industry of Iran
- Islamic Republic of Iran Army
- List of military equipment manufactured in Iran
