= S-200 missile system =

Surface-to-air missile system

S-200 Angara/Vega/Dubna SA-5 Gammon
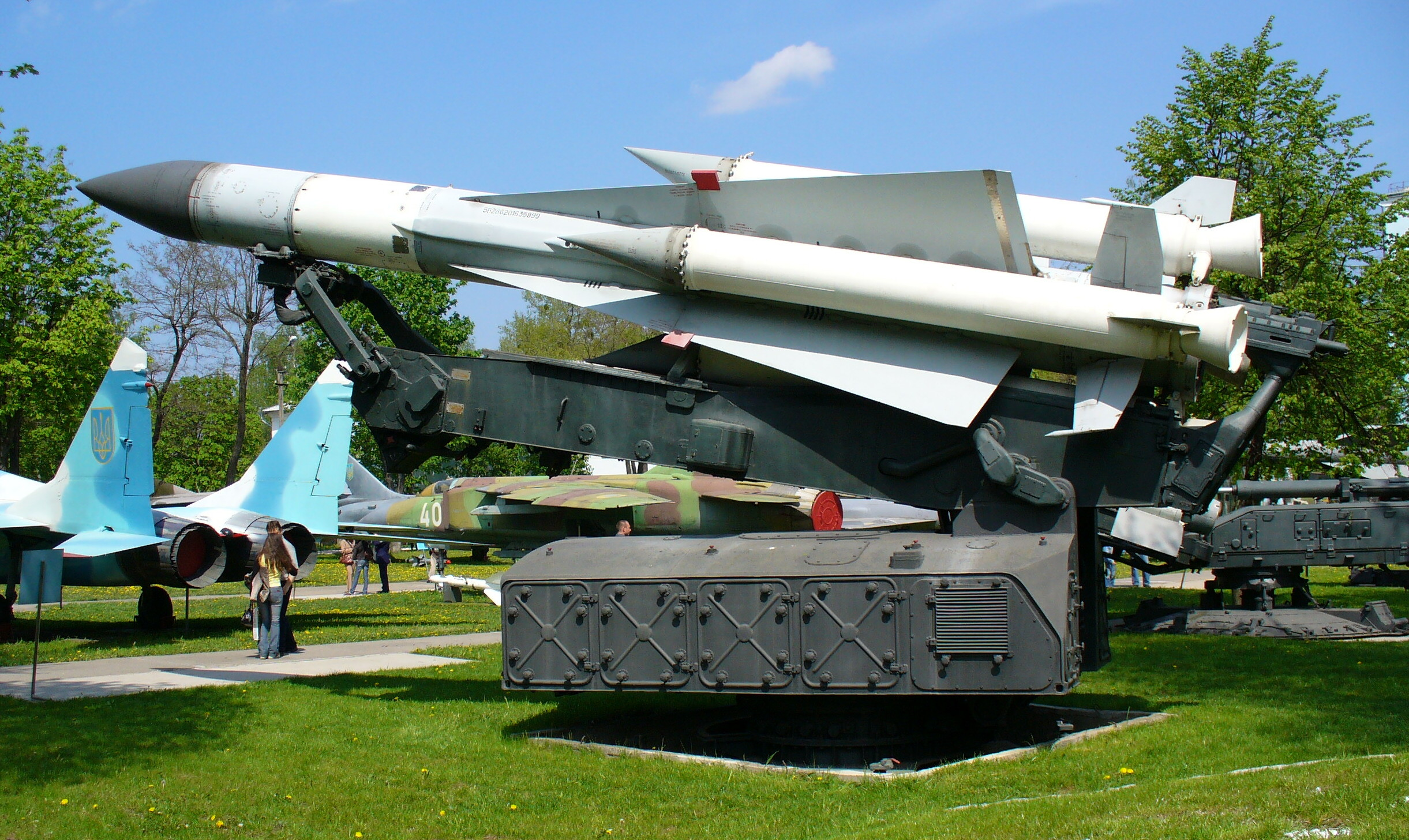
- S-200V missile on its launcher
- Type: Strategic SAM system
- Place of origin: Soviet Union

Service history
- In service: 1967–present
- Used by: See list of present and former operators
- Wars: First Libyan Civil War; Syrian civil war Russo-Ukrainian war

Production history
- Designer: KB-1 design bureau (system), GSKB Spetsmash (launcher)
- Designed: 1964
- Variants: S-200A, S-200V, S-200M, S-200VE, S-200D, S-200C

Specifications
- Guidance system: Semi-active radar homing

The NPO Almaz S-200 Angara/Vega/Dubna (Russian: С-200 Ангара/Вега/Дубна), NATO reporting name SA-5 Gammon (initially Tallinn), is a long-range, high-altitude surface-to-air missile (SAM) system developed by the Soviet Union in the 1960s to defend large areas from high-altitude bombers or other targets. In Soviet service, these systems were deployed primarily on the battalion level, with six launchers and a fire control radar.

The S-200 can be linked to other longer-range radar systems.

== Background ==
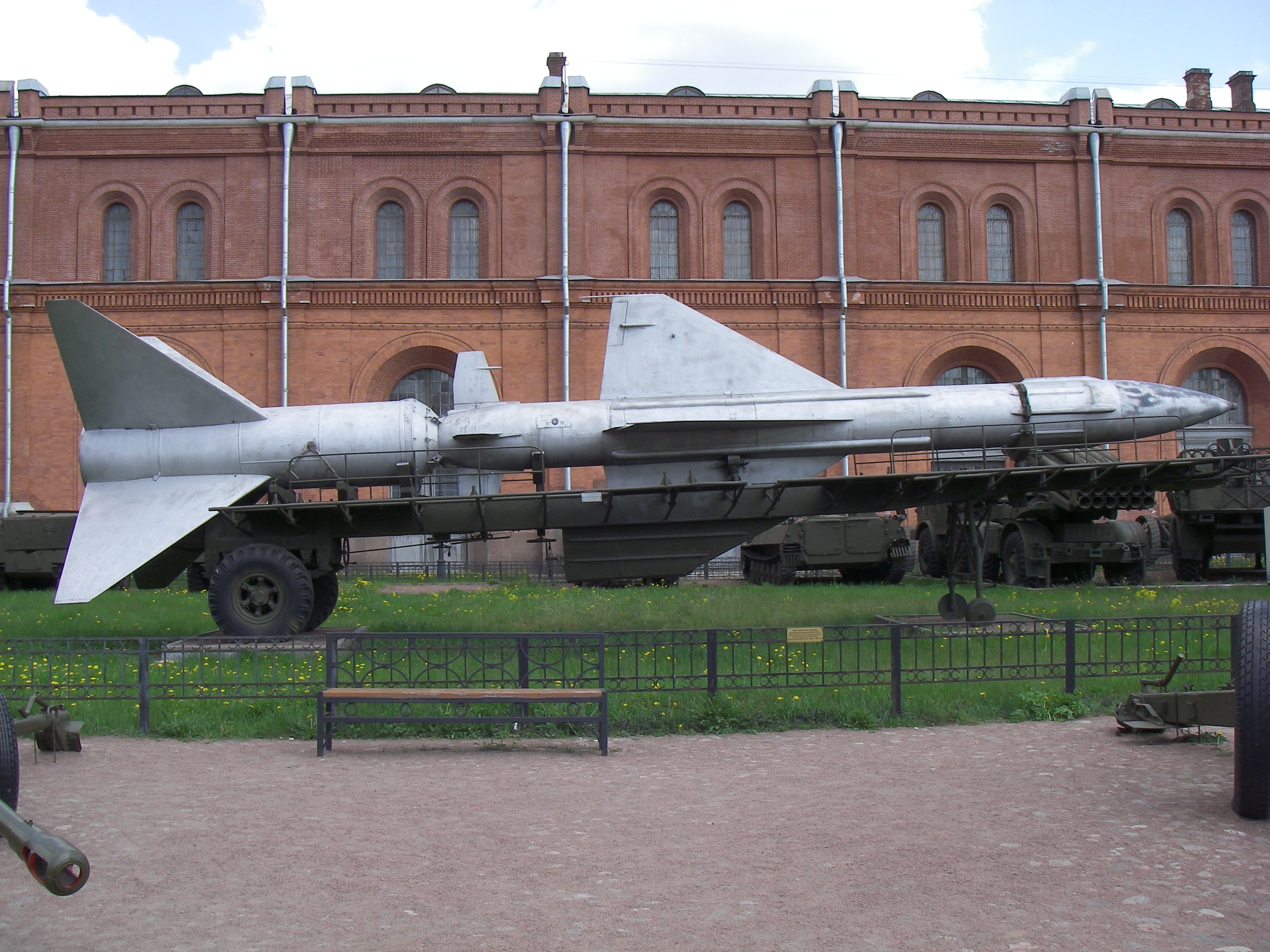
Two-stage V-400 (5V11) Angara missile of the Dal SAM system in Saint-Petersburg Artillery museum.

After trials of the S-25 Berkut in 1955, the Soviet Union started development of the RS-25 Dal long-range missile system with the V-400/5V11 missile. It was initially assigned the "SA-5" designation in the West and codenamed "Griffon", but the project was abandoned in 1964. The SA-5 designation was then assigned to the S-200.

== Description ==
At the height of the Cold War, nuclear-armed B-52s flew around the Warsaw Pact territory on a continuous patrol. In the event of a nuclear conflict, these bombers were the primary targets for these missiles. S-200 Vega systems having a warhead replaceable with a 25 kt TNT nuclear warhead and a range of around 250 km.

The S-200 surface-to-air missile system was designed for the defense of the most important administrative, industrial and military installations from all types of air attack. The S-200 is an all-weather system that can be operated in various climatic conditions.

The first S-200 operational regiments were deployed in 1966 with 18 sites and 342 launchers in service by the end of the year. By 1968 there were 40 sites, and by 1969 there were 60 sites. The growth in numbers then gradually increased throughout the 1970s (1,100 launchers) and early 1980s until the peak of 130 sites and 2,030 launchers was reached in 1980–1990.

=== Variants ===
- S-200A "Angara" (Russian: С-200А, NATO reporting name SA-5a), with the V-860/5V21 or V-860P/5V21A missile, introduced in 1967, range 160 km (99 mi), ceiling 20.1 km (12.5 mi).
- S-200V "Vega" (Note: The Cyrillic character В is most commonly romanized as a Latin V, but some transliterations (such as the German Duden transliteration) use the Latin W. To keep a consistent style, this article uses the common "V" romanization.) (Russian: С-200В, NATO reporting name SA-5b), with the V-860PV/5V21P or 5V28V missiles, introduced in 1970, range 250 km (160 mi), ceiling 29.2 km (18.1 mi). With the V-870 missile, range increased to 280 km (170 mi) and ceiling to 40 km (25 mi).
- S-200M "Vega-M" (Russian: С-200М, NATO reporting name SA-5b), with the V-880/5V28 or V-880N/5V28N missiles, introduced 1970, range 300 km (190 mi), ceiling 29 km (18 mi). The V-880N/5V28N was the first missile for the S-200 which could be equipped with a 25 kilotonne nuclear warhead, with the "N" in the designation standing for "nuclear".
- S-200VE "Vega-E" (Note: Some German sources romanize the Cyrillic Э as Ä. The more common romanization as a Latin E is used in this article for consistency.) (Russian: С-200ВЭ, NATO reporting name SA-5b), with the V-880E/5V28E missile, export version with high-explosive warhead only, introduced 1973, range 240–255 km (149–158 mi), ceiling 40.8 km (25.4 mi).
- S-200D "Dubna" (Russian: С-200Д, NATO reporting name SA-5c), with the 5V25V, V-880M/5V28M, and V-880MN/5V28MN missiles, introduced in 1976, range 300 km (190 mi), ceiling 40 km (25 mi). The V-880MN/5V28MN were equipped with a 5 kilotonne nuclear warhead.
- S-200C "Vega", a Polish evolution of the S-200VE, resulting from a refit undertaken between 1999 and 2002.

The Iranian air defense force has implemented several improvements on their S-200 systems such as using solid state parts and removing restrictions on working time. They reportedly destroyed a UAV target beyond 100 km range in a military drill in recent years. They use two new, solid propellant missiles named Sayyad-2 and Sayyad-3, via interface systems Talash-2 and Talash-3 in cooperation with S-200 system. These missiles can cover medium and long ranges at high altitudes. Iran claims to have developed a mobile launcher for the system.

While the S-200 features vastly superior range than other air defense systems such as the S-400, it does not have the same mobility that the latter systems have. This means that while it still has the ability to switch off its radar to avoid detection and turn incoming ARMs dumb, it cannot move out of the way of incoming INS guided munitions such as JDAMs, a primary tactic of mobile air defense systems such as the S-400. The components of an S-200 system are transported by modified trucks during installation, but cannot easily move. This requires the site to be defended by AAA, SPAAA, MANPADS, other shorter range air defense systems, and other means of protection from adversary SEAD platforms.

The command post of the S-300 system (SA-20/SA-20A/SA-20B) can manage the elements of the S-200 and S-300 in any combination. The S-200 Dubna missile complex can be controlled by the S-300's command post, and the S-300 missile complex can be controlled by the S-400 command post or through a higher-level command post (Organize Use PVO 73N6 "Baikal-1").

=== Radar ===
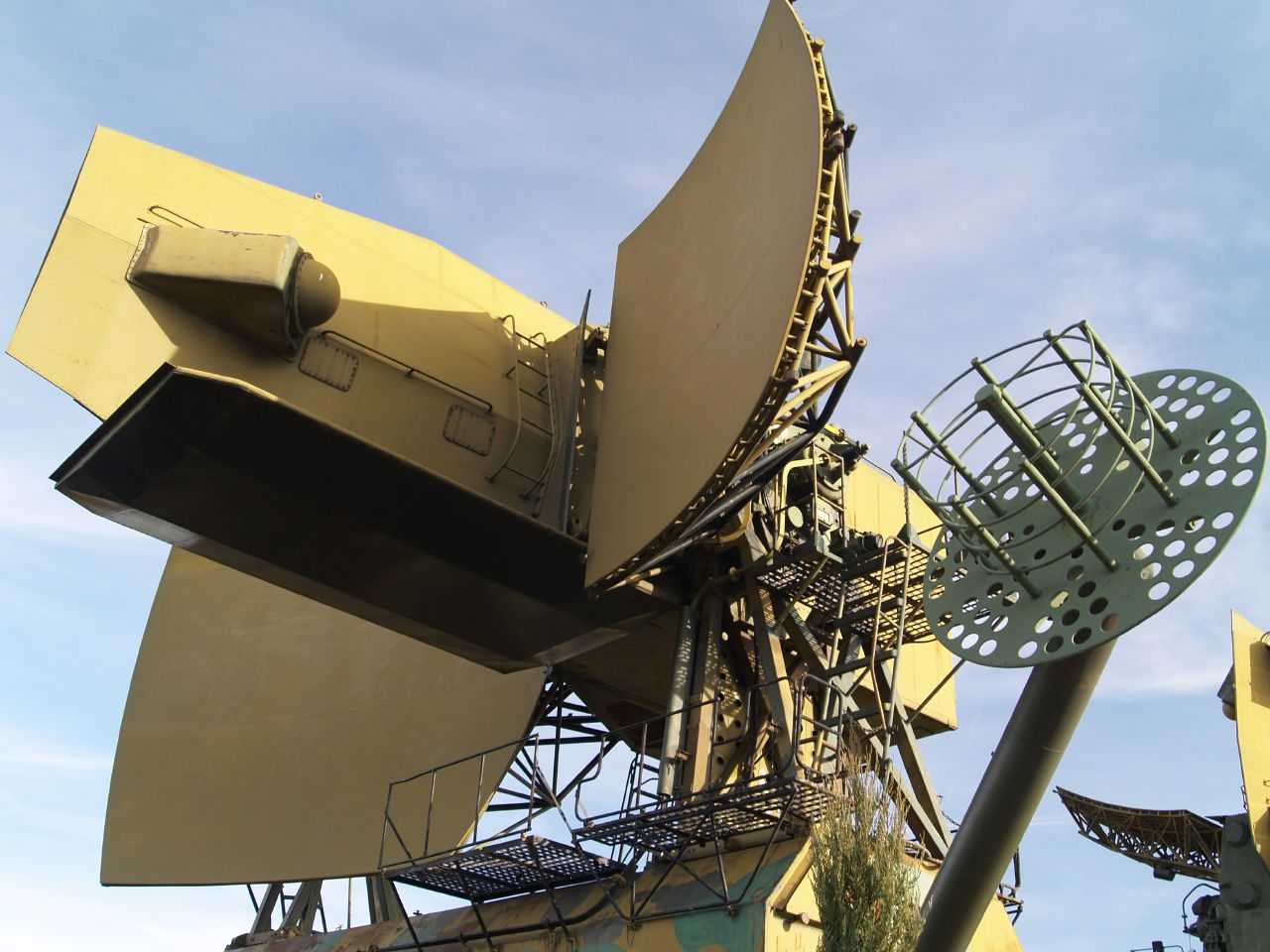
A 5N62 "Square Pair" fire control radar in a Hungarian museum

The fire control radar of the S-200 system is the 5N62 (NATO reporting name: Square Pair) H band continuous wave radar, and is used for both the tracking of targets and their illumination. The 5N62V variant could track larger targets like strategic bombers at 450 km (280 mi), smaller aircraft like fighter-bombers at 300 km (190 mi), and cruise missiles at c. 170 km (110 mi). The 5N62 had two main components, the K-1 and K-2 "cabins", with the former containing the antenna. The K-1 could rotate around its own axis at 15 degrees per second, completing a full turn in 24 seconds and would make elevation adjustments at 5.5 degrees per second. A K-1 in assembled state weighed 30 tonnes (66,000 lb). The K-2 cabin contained the command post and weighed about 25 tonnes (55,000 lb).

Initial detection of targets was conducted by a P-14/5N84A (NATO: Tall King C) A band early warning radar, operating in the 150–170 MHz range at 3–6 RPM, with a PRV-17 (NATO: Odd Group) height finding radar assisting in determining the target's altitude.

The P-35 (NATO: Bar Lock) E/F band radar could also be associated with the S-200.

=== Missiles ===
5V21 family
- Type: Surface-to-air missile
- Place of origin: Soviet Union

Service history
- In service: 1967–present
- Used by: See list of operators

Production history
- Designer: OKB-2 design bureau (missile), SKB-35 bureau (avionics), NII-125 research institute (solid rocket propellant)
- Variants: 5V21, 5V25, 5V28; See also § Variants

Specifications (5V28E)
- Mass: 7,018 kg (15,472 lb) (with boosters); 3,918 kg (8,638 lb) (second stage only)
- Length: 10,764 mm (35.315 ft) (with boosters); 10,452 mm (34.291 ft) (second stage only)
- Diameter: 752 mm (2.467 ft)
- Wingspan: 2.52 m (8.3 ft)
- Warhead: Frag-HE
- Warhead weight: 217 kg (478 lb)
- Detonation mechanism: Proximity and command fusing
- Engine: Main: Dual-thrust liquid-fueled rocket engine Boosters: 4 solid-fueled strap-on rocket boosters
- Operational range: 240–255 kilometres (149–158 mi)
- Flight ceiling: 40,800 metres (133,900 ft)
- Boost time: 3–5.1 seconds
- Maximum speed: 1,400 m/s (Mach 4.1; 5,000 km/h; 3,100 mph)
- Guidance system: Semi-active radar homing seeker head

The S-200 missile system's numerous variants have been equipped with several different missiles over its operational history, notably the 5V21, 5V25, and 5V28 missiles and their subvariants.

The 5V28E missile is launched by four solid-fueled strap-on rocket boosters designated 5S25 which burn for between 3 and 5.1 seconds, generating 40 tonnes-force (390 kN; 39 LTf; 44 STf) (+/- 8%) of thrust each, for a total of circa 160 tonnes-force (1,600 kN; 160 LTf; 180 STf). After the boosters burn out, they are released from the missile in pairs and drop away. The missile's second stage is a liquid fueled sustainer rocket engine, designated 5D67, fueled by a two-component rocket propellant made up of 720 litres (160 imp gal; 190 US gal) TG-02 Samin fuel (50% xylidine and 50% triethylamine) and 1,085 litres (239 imp gal; 287 US gal) of the oxidizing agent AK-27P (consisting of at least 69.5% pure nitric acid and 24–28% dinitrogen tetroxide). The second stage burns for between 51 and 150 seconds. The missile reaches its maximum effective range of 255 km (138 nmi) after 215 seconds. With a minimum engagement range of 17 km (11 mi), the 5V28E variant was able to engage targets at altitudes up to 40,800 m (133,900 ft), with a minimum altitude of 300 m (980 ft) outside of 38 km (24 mi), and at least 1,000 m (3,300 ft) at shorter ranges. Target speeds could range between 100 m/s (Mach 0.29; 360 km/h; 220 mph) and 1,200 m/s (Mach 3.5; 4,300 km/h; 2,700 mph). The 5V28E's high-explosive fragmentation warhead weighs 217 kg (478 lb) in total and contains 16,000 × 2 g fragmentation pellets, 21,000 × 3.5 g pellets, and 90 kg (200 lb) of explosives. Triggered by radar proximity fuse, the warhead was designed to destroy targets within a 120-degree cone at up to 200 m (660 ft).

The 5V28N and 5V28MN were the only missile variants equipped with a nuclear warhead, the latter with a yield equivalent to 5 kilotonnes of TNT. Following the war in Ukraine, the S-200 system has been modified, as Ukraine use it for long range strikes and a high altitude interception system, by using modernized fire-control methods, helping it to target threats 250-300 km away.

== Operational history ==
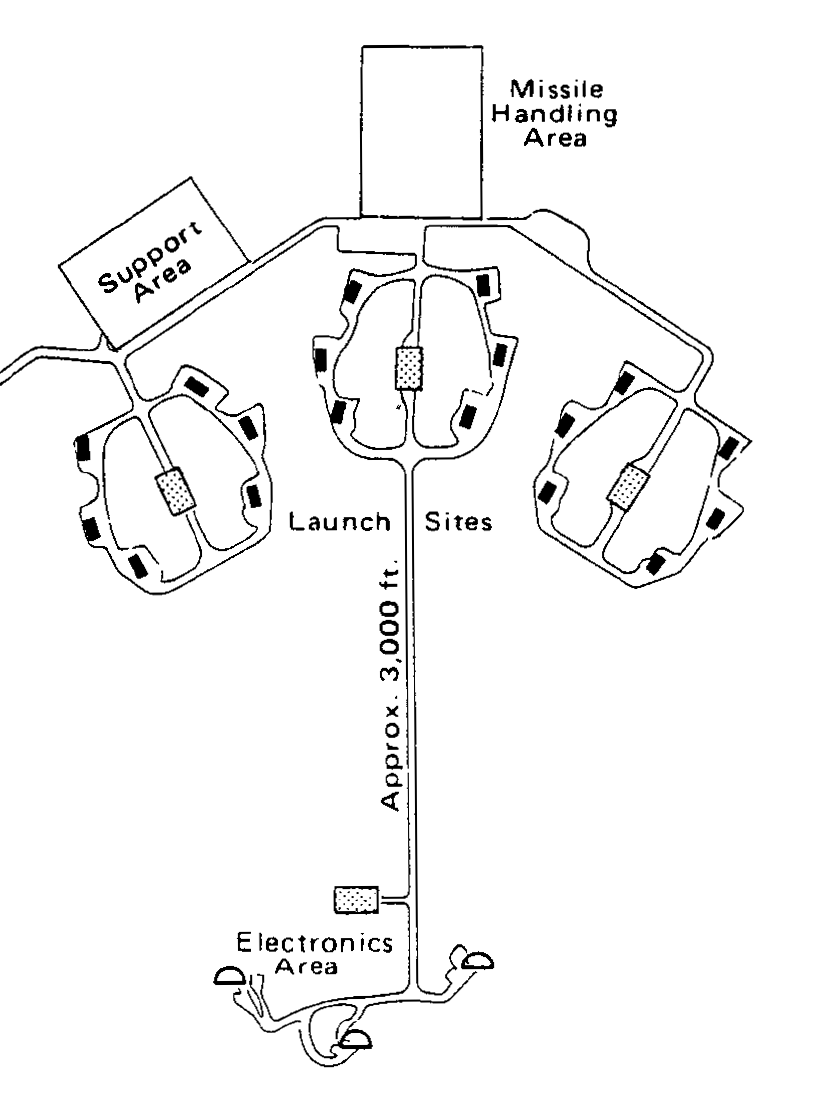
Layout of a typical SA-5 complex with three launch sites (consisting of six launchers each).

=== Iran ===
On 11 March 2026, during the 2026 Iran War, the United States military hit an Iranian S-200 launcher. The S-200 launcher was positioned at Bushehr airbase and formed part of the air defense network protecting the nearby Bushehr Nuclear Power Plant.

=== Libya ===
Starting in 1985, Libya received a number of S-200 missile systems. In the following months, Libyan forces fired a number of S-200 missiles on different occasions at US fighter-bombers, missing them. In the USSR, three organizations (CDB Almaz, a test site and a research institute of the Ministry of Defense) conducted computer simulation of the battle, which gave the probability of hitting each of the air targets (3) in the range from 96 to 99%.

=== Syria ===
Starting in January 1983, Syria received supplies of S-200 missiles from the Soviet Union. They were organized into two long range surface-to-air missile regiments, each composed of two battalions of two batteries each for a total of at least 24 launchers. Later in the 1980s, the Soviet Union agreed to supply a third regiment increasing the number of launchers to 40–50. Initially, the missiles were manned by Soviet crews. In April 1984, a U.S. intelligence report cited a Soviet official claiming that training of Syrian personnel was nearly complete and that the transfer of the system to Syrian control was to occur in the near future.

During the initial years of the Syrian civil war, parts of the S-200 systems were occasionally spotted when Syrian Air Defense Force sites were overrun by rebel forces. Most notably radars, missiles and other equipment from S-200 systems was pictured in a state of disrepair when rebels overtook the air defense site in Eastern Ghouta in October 2012. On 2 January 2017, the Syrian Army recaptured this air defense base.

Starting with the Russian intervention in the civil war in late 2015, there were new efforts to restore some Syrian S-200 systems. Indeed, on 15 November 2016, the Russian defence minister confirmed that Russian forces repaired Syrian S-200s to operational status. For example, in July 2016, the Syrian Army, with Russian assistance, rebuilt an S-200 site at Kweires airport, near Aleppo. On September 12, 2016, the Israel Defense Forces confirmed that two Syrian S-200 missiles were fired at Israeli aircraft while they were on a mission inside Syrian airspace. The Syrian Defense Ministry claimed that an Israeli jet and a drone were shot down. According to the IDF spokesman's office, the claims are "total lies," and "at no point was the safety of IDF aircraft compromised."

On March 17, 2017, the Israeli Air Force attacked a number of Syrian armed forces targets near Palmyria in Syria. During the action a number of Syrian S-200 missiles were fired at the Israeli aircraft. One of the Syrian missiles, going ballistic after losing its target, was inbound to a populated area in Israel. The Israeli missile defense fired at least one Arrow missile which intercepted the incoming missile. Two other S-200 missiles landed in other parts of Israel, having lost their target. According to ANNA News, Syria claimed that they had shot down one IAF F-16 aircraft and damaged another. While the Syrian Defense Ministry claimed that an Israeli fighter jet was shot down, which was denied by Israel, Israeli defence minister Avigdor Lieberman threatened to destroy Syrian air defence systems after they fired ground-to-air missiles at Israeli warplanes carrying out strikes. The Jordanian armed forces reported that parts of a missile fell in its territory. There were no casualties in Jordan.

On October 16, 2017, a Syrian S-200 battery located around 50 kilometers east of Damascus fired a missile at an Israeli Air Force surveillance mission over Lebanon. The IAF responded by attacking the battery and destroying the fire control radar with four bombs. Despite this, the Syrian Defense Ministry said in its statement that the air-defense forces "directly hit one of the jets, forcing [Israeli aircraft] to retreat." Israel said that no plane was hit.

On February 10, 2018, Israel launched an airstrike against targets in Syria with eight fighter aircraft as retaliation for a UAV incursion into Israeli airspace earlier in the day. Syrian air defenses succeeded in shooting down one of the Israeli jets, an F-16I Sufa, with an S-200 missile - this was the first Israeli jet to be shot down in combat since 1982. The jet crashed in the Jezreel Valley, near Harduf. Both the pilot and the navigator managed to eject; one was injured lightly, the other more seriously, but both survived and walked out of the hospital one week later.

On 10 May 2018, Israeli Air Force launched Operation House of Cards against a number of Iranian and Syrian targets, claiming the destruction of a S-200 radar among different other targets.

On September 17, 2018, a Russian Il-20M ELINT plane was shot down by a Syrian S-200 surface-to-air missile killing all the 15 servicemen onboard. Four Israeli F-16 fighter jets attacked targets in Syria's Latakia with standoff missiles, after approaching from the Mediterranean Sea, a statement by the Russian defense ministry said on 18 September. “The Israeli pilots used the Russian plane as cover and set it up to be targeted by the Syrian air defense forces. As a consequence, the Il-20, which has radar cross-section much larger than the F-16, was shot down by an S-200 system missile,” the statement said. The Russian ministry stressed that the Israelis must have known that the Russian plane was present in the area, which didn't stop them from “the provocation”. Israel also failed to warn Russia about the planned operation in advance. The warning came a minute before the attack started, which “did not leave time to move the Russian plane to a safe area,” the statement said. On 21 September, an Israeli delegation visiting Moscow stated that the Israeli attack formation did not use the Russian Il-20 as a shield during the attacks, while blaming the incident on the Syrian Air Defense Force which fired missiles for forty minutes while the Israeli attack formation had already left the area. Russian President Vladimir Putin downplayed the incident saying that "it looks accidental, like a chain of tragic circumstances".

On 1 July 2019, a stray S-200 missile fired from Syria, presumably during bombing raids there, hit Northern Cyprus. The missile hit the ground around 1:00 a.m. near the village of Taşkent, also known as Vouno, some 20 kilometers (12 miles) northeast of Nicosia. No one was injured.

On 22 April 2021, a stray S-200 missile exploded in the air some 30 kilometers from the Dimona nuclear reactor over Israel. The missile was fired from Dumayr, part of a salvo in response to Israeli jets conducting strikes on targets in the Syrian-controlled Golan Heights. Israeli air defenses tried to intercept the errant missile, but missed. Around an hour later, IDF said Israeli fighter jets struck the air defense battery which launched the missile. On 19 August 2021, in response to an Israeli air raid, the Syrian Air Defense fired several Surface to Air missiles at attacking Israeli jets and missiles. One of the S-200 fired missed and exploded above the Dead Sea. On 3 September 2021, a missile fired by the Syrian army exploded over Tel Aviv. In response to the Syrian missile attack, the Israeli Air Force claim destroyed a battery of the Russian-made S-200 missile system of Syrian Army.

=== Ukraine ===
A Ukrainian S-200 operated by the Ukrainian military during a joint Ukrainian-Russian military air-defence exercises at the Russian-controlled training ground fired on a Tupolev Tu-154 passenger aircraft flying from Tel Aviv to Novosibirsk, Siberia Airlines Flight 1812. The airliner was destroyed over the Black Sea on 4 October 2001, killing all 78 people on board.

The systems were retired from service in 2013. The official reasons behind the decision was high maintenance costs and the systems were becoming obsolete, but according to former deputy chief of the General Staff of the Ukrainian Armed Forces, Lt. Gen. Ihor Romanenko, some military personnel unsuccessfully tried to keep the S-200 in service.

Ukrainian armed forces possibly used modified S-200 missiles in a ground attack role in 2023, during the Russo-Ukrainian war, to attack Russian positions in Bryansk Oblast and Crimea. It was reported that the missiles were used in an attack on the Crimean Bridge.

Ukrainian armed forces claim to have used an S-200 to shoot down a Beriev A-50 in the evening of 23 February 2024 over the Sea of Azov. The shot down aircraft was identified as A-50U "42 red" of the 610th CBP i PLS.

On 19 April 2024, Ukraine claimed to have shot down a Russian Tu-22M3 long-range strategic bomber over Stavropol Krai. Ukraine claimed that the bomber was trying to return to base but crashed near Stavropol. Russian authorities claimed the aircraft crashed due to a technical malfunction, killing one crew member, with another missing. A second aircraft was reported to have turned around after the destruction of the first. Ukraine's HUR claimed that a S-200 missile was used, as the same type of missile that shot down an Beriev A-50 earlier in 2024. At a range of some 300 km, it could have been the first time that Ukraine has shot down a Tu-22 in the air, having "highly likely destroyed" one Tu-22 at an airbase in Novgorod, in August 2023, using drones. On 19 April 2024, Ukraine claimed to have shot it down, at a range of 308 km, using an S-200 missile, according to an interview with Lt. Gen. Kyrylo Budanov, head of the HUR.

According to the Stockholm International Peace Research Institute (SIPRI), Poland supplied Ukraine with a S-200 Angara system and 20 missiles in 2023.

== Operators ==
=== Current ===
- Azerbaijan
- Bulgaria – 12 launchers as of 2026.
- Iran – 10 systems as of 2026.
- Kazakhstan – 1 battery (3 systems) as of 2026.
- North Korea – 10 systems as of 2026, serviceability doubtful.
- Syria – Unknown number of systems in service with the Syrian Air Force as of 2026.
- Turkmenistan – 2 batteries (12 systems) as of 2026.
- Ukraine – Used by the Special Operations Forces as of 2026.

=== Former ===
- Belarus
- Czechoslovakia – 5 battalions, passed to Czech Republic.
- Czech Republic – Inherited all Czechoslovak S-200 SAM systems, out of service since mid-1990s.
- East Germany – 4 battalions S-200VE, passed to unified Germany in 1990.
- Georgia
- Germany – 4 battalions S-200VE from East Germany received during German reunification in 1990, last site out of service in 1993
- Hungary – One battery with six launchers
- India − Several sites in 2002
- Libyan Arab Jamahiriya – 8 battalions with six launchers each
- Moldova
- Poland − 1 division (12 launchers) and 20 missiles donated to Ukraine in 2023
- Russia – Less than 100 launchers remained in 2002
- Soviet Union – Originally deployed with the ZA-PVO in the strategic air defense role. It was phased out starting in the 1980s and passed on to the successor states before the phasing out process could be completed.
- Uzbekistan

== See also ==
- S-75 Dvina
- Bloodhound (missile)
- MIM-14 Nike Hercules
- Sayyad-2
- Sayyad-3
- List of NATO reporting names for surface-to-air missiles
- List of surface-to-air missiles

== Sources ==
- International Institute for Strategic Studies (23 February 2026). "Chapter Three: Europe". The Military Balance. 126 (1). Taylor & Francis: 56–159. doi:10.1080/04597222.2026.2608516.
- International Institute for Strategic Studies (23 February 2026). "Chapter Four: Russia and Eurasia". The Military Balance. 126 (1). Taylor & Francis: 160–215. doi:10.1080/04597222.2026.2608517.
- International Institute for Strategic Studies (23 February 2026). "Chapter Five: Asia". The Military Balance. 126 (1). Taylor & Francis: 216–321. doi:10.1080/04597222.2026.2608519.
- International Institute for Strategic Studies (23 February 2026). "Chapter Six: Middle East and North Africa". The Military Balance. 126 (1). Taylor & Francis: 322–389. doi:10.1080/04597222.2026.2608520.
- Kraus, Peter (2019). Luftverteidigung der DDR: Fla-Ra-Komplex S-200 »Wega« (in German). Motorbuch Verlag. ISBN 9783613042124. OCLC 1112139017.
- O'Halloran, James C; Foss, Christopher F, eds. (2002). Jane's Land-Based Air Defense 2002-2003 (15th ed.). Janes Information Group. ISBN 978-0-7106-2437-6.
