= Pongae-5 =

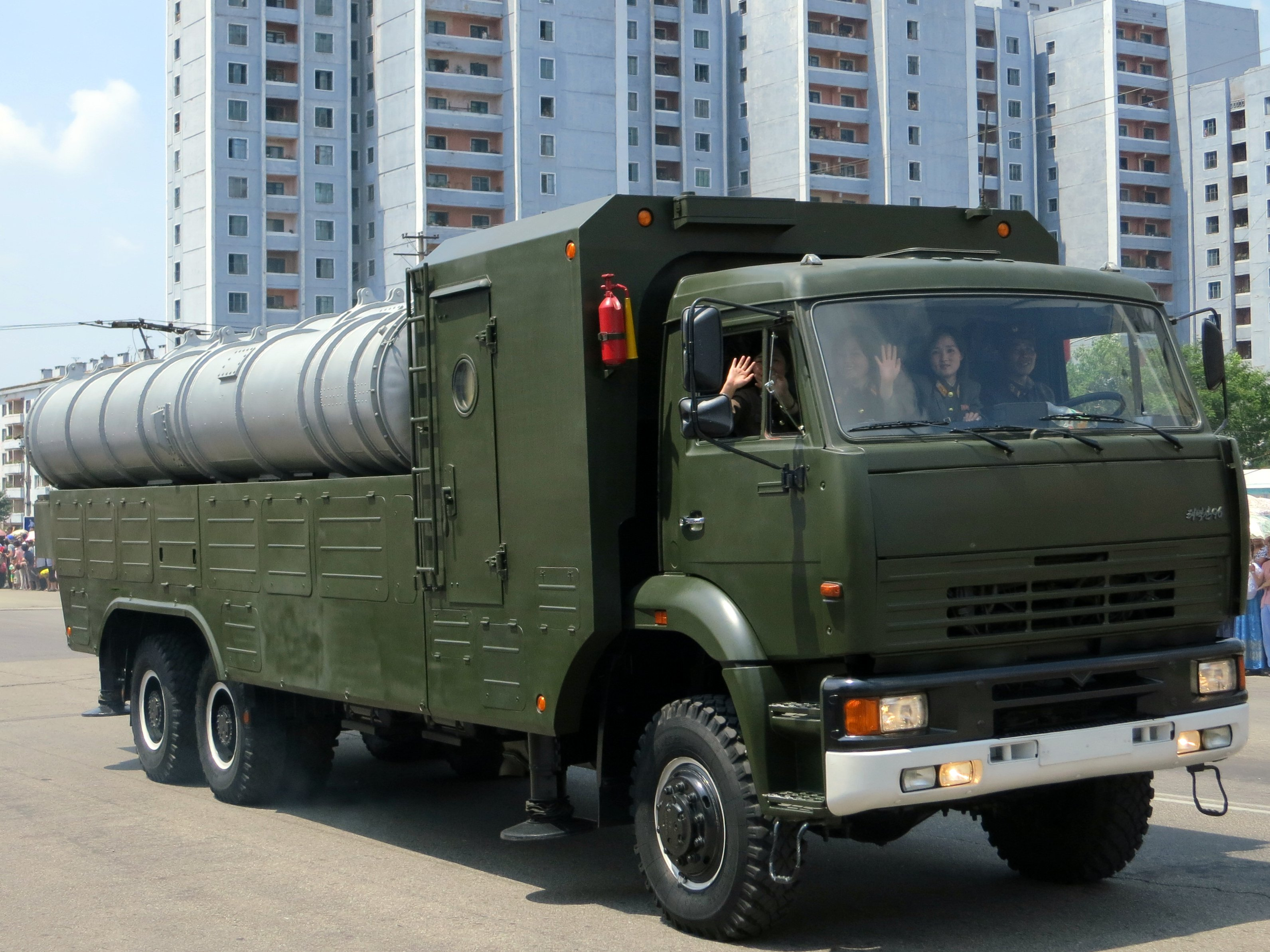
- Type: Surface-to-air missile
- Place of origin: North Korea

Service history
- In service: Korean People's Army Air Force
- Used by: North Korea

Production history
- Manufacturer: North Korea industries
- Produced: 2017

Specifications
- Mass: 1,300–1,700 kg (2,900–3,700 lb)
- Length: 6.8–7.25 m (22.3–23.8 ft)
- Diameter: 0.45–0.50 m (1.5–1.6 ft)
- Warhead: explosive HE
- Warhead weight: 120–500 kg (260–1,100 lb)
- Engine: solid propellant rocket engine
- Propellant: solid
- Operational range: At least 150 km (93 mi)
- Guidance system: Radar, data link, track-via-missile
- Launch platform: TEL, 6x6 KamAZ-55111 truck (Taebaeksan 96)

The Pongae-5 (Korean: 번개-5; lit. Lightning-5; KN-06 under the United States naming convention) is a North Korean surface-to-air missile system. The system was first shown publicly at the 65th anniversary of the Workers’ Party of Korea on 10 October 2010.

== Description ==
The Pongae-5 is a long-range SAM that bears resemblance to the Russian S-300 and Chinese FT-2000. The interceptor is likely to be 6.8–7.25 m (22.3–23.8 ft) long and 0.45–0.50 m (1.5–1.6 ft) wide, while having a mass of 1,300–1,700 kg (2,900–3,700 lb). Imagery of missile launch tubes shows they are larger in diameter, but shorter than the S-300's missiles. The missiles are mounted on locally produced, stretched 6x6 KamAZ 55111 (Taebaeksan 96) launcher trucks, with each holding three missile tubes. Pongae-5 is reported to have a range of at least 150 kilometres (93 mi) and has a high-explosive warhead, weighing 120–500 kg (260–1,100 lb). The system is equipped with phased array radar and track-via-missile guidance system.

A Pongae-5 missile unit may consist of a command vehicle and a radar station, as well as up to 12 missile launchers.

== History ==
In March 2010, Kim Jong Il reportedly visited the Huichon Youth Electrical Complex where he examined Pongae-5 missiles. Later, Pongae-5 was unveiled on 10 October 2010 during a military parade.

A test launch occurred in June 2011. Another test launch, attended by Kim Jong Un was reported on 2 April 2016. As of May 2017, it was reportedly still undergoing testing.

The system underwent final testing on 28 May 2017, with KCNA reporting that 'glitches' previously identified during testing had been resolved. It said the new system would be mass-produced and deployed across the country.

According to the Center for Strategic and International Studies, North Korea has 156 operational Pongae-5 mobile launchers.

== Operators ==
- North Korea

== See also ==
- S-300VM
- S-300
- HQ-9
- HQ-16
- Bavar 373
- Sayyad-2
- TK-3
