= HQ-17 =

Surface-to-air missile system

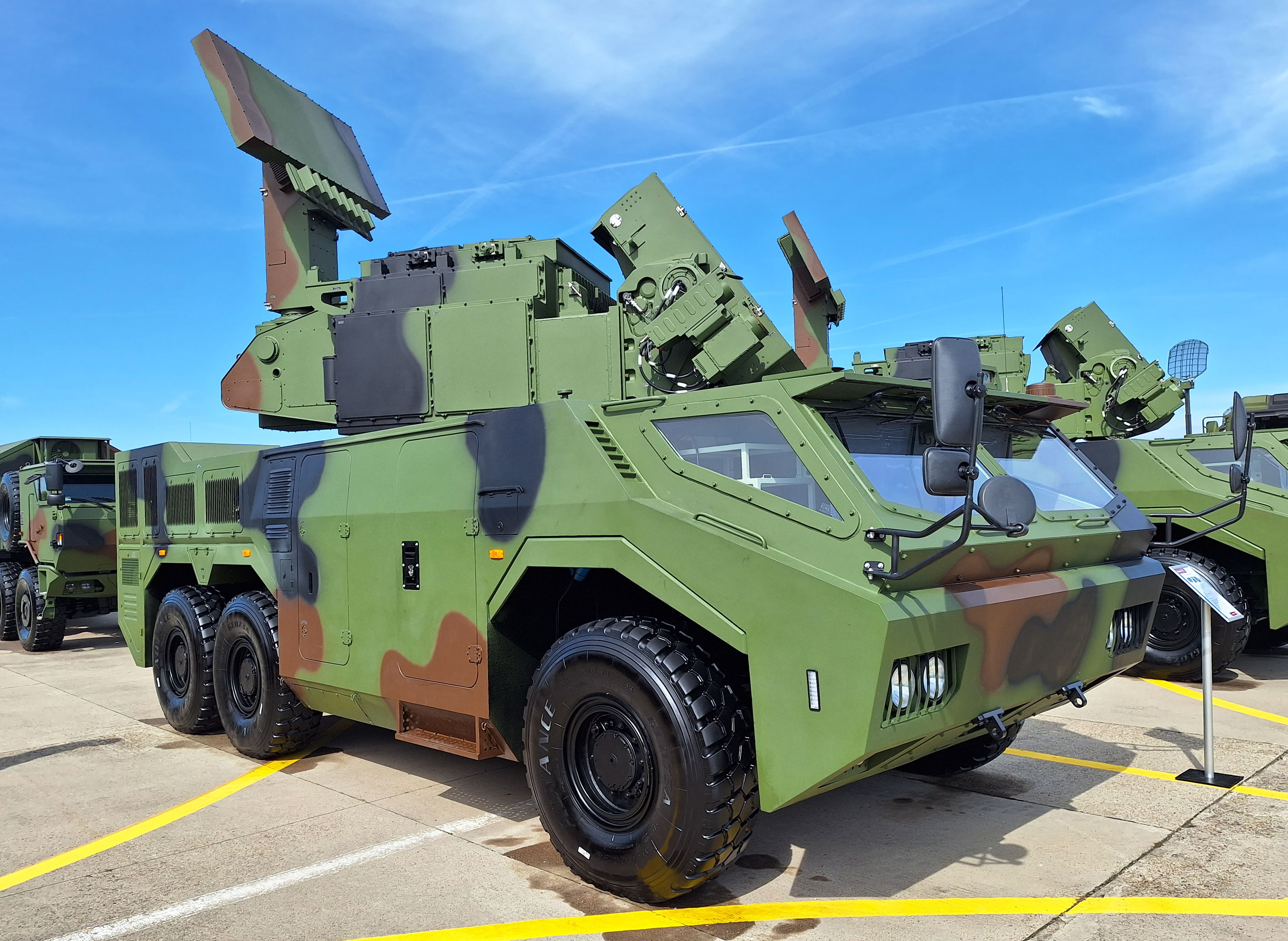
- Serbian Armed Forces HQ-17AE
- Type: Surface-to-air missile
- Place of origin: China

Service history
- In service: 2015 – present
- Used by: China

Production history
- Manufacturer: China Aerospace Science and Industry Corporation (CASIC)

Specifications
- Mass: ~ 165 kg
- Length: ~ 2.9 m
- Diameter: ~ 0.23 m
- Warhead: ~ 15 kg HE-FRAG
- Engine: rocket motor
- Propellant: solid fuel
- Operational range: 1.5 km to 20 km
- Flight altitude: 10 m to 10 km
- Maximum speed: Mach 3
- Guidance system: Semi-active radar homing
- Launch platform: TEL (HQ-17); 6x6 Wheeled Platform (HQ-17A)

The HQ-17 (simplified Chinese: 红旗-17; traditional Chinese: 紅旗-17; pinyin: Hóng Qí-17; lit. 'Red Banner-17'; NATO reporting name: CH-SA-15) is an all-weather, low to medium altitude, short-range surface-to-air missile system derived from the Tor-M1. The system is developed by the China Aerospace Science and Industry Corporation (CASIC).

== Development ==
In 1996, China ordered 14 Tor-M1 missile systems from Russia, delivered under contract in 1997. In 1999, another contract for 13 Tor-M1 systems was signed between Russia and China. Delivery of the systems took place in 2000.

Around 2000, China sought to license-produce the Tor-M1 missile system locally; however, Russia reportedly refused. As a result, China decided to reverse-engineer the missile system.

The HQ-17 was incorporated into Chinese army service around early 2013. The system's existence was confirmed by the Chinese military in 2015. An export variant, called FM-2000, was displayed at the Zhuhai Airshow in 2018. In 2019, during China's 70th anniversary parade, the HQ-17A wheeled variant was publicly unveiled.

== Design ==
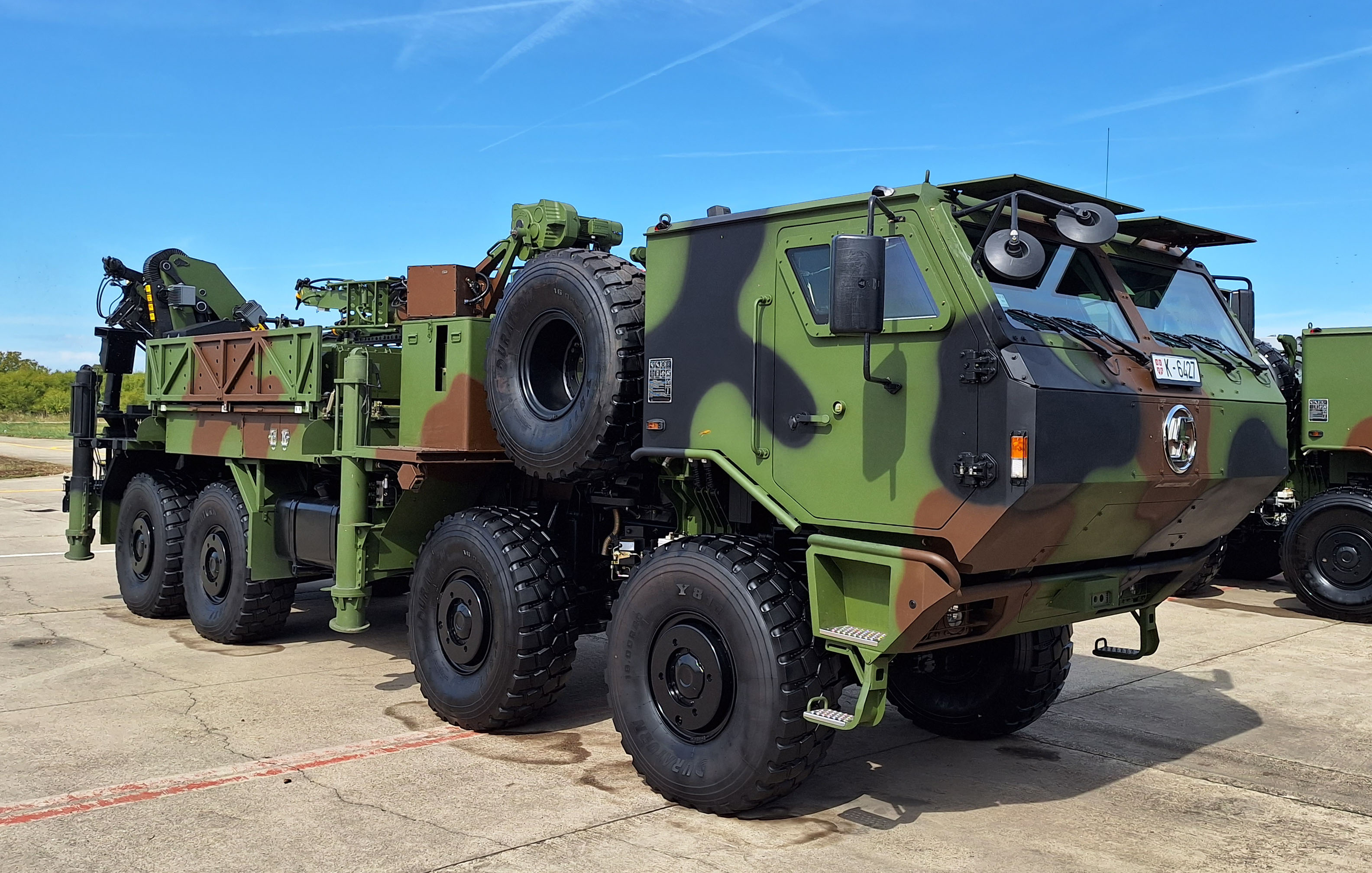
HQ-17's ammunition vehicle, based on the Shaanxi HMV3 truck chassis

The HQ-17 features various improvements over the Tor-M1 system. The HQ-17 incorporates an indigenous all-terrain tracked launch vehicle, a new identification friend or foe (IFF) antenna on top of the search radar, an electronically scanned array radar for better performance against jamming, and the ability to datalink with other Chinese systems.

A typical HQ-17 air defense battery consists of one command vehicle, 4 missile launch vehicles, 2 NG-80 reloading vehicles, 2 NG-80 ammunition transport vehicles, and other support vehicles. Although a battery of the HQ-17 usually operates independently, it can also receive data-linked targeting data from surveillance radars.

The HQ-17 is designed to keep up with mechanized troops like tank battalions to provide air cover on the move, as well as protect critical military premises.

=== Armament ===
The HQ-17 missile is physically similar to the Tor-M1, with a weight of around 165 kg, a length of around 2.9 m, and a diameter of around 0.23 m. Its slant range for intercepting flying aerial targets is 1.5 km to 15 km, slightly longer than the Tor-M1, and operates at an altitude of 10 m to 10 km.

The missile guidance system comprises semi-active radar homing by either the tracking radar, the television sight, or the thermal sight on the launch vehicle.

Each vehicle carries 2 x 4 missile canisters for a total of 8 missiles, which can be reloaded 4 missiles at a time by a Shaanxi SX2306 reloading truck equipped with a crane.

=== Fire control ===
Each launch vehicle carries one PESA search radar and one AESA guidance radar. The Chinese PESA search radar has a longer range than the original Tor system, with a detection range of 45 km. The system can monitor up to 48 targets, track 24 targets, and engage 2 targets simultaneously. Other tracking devices include laser rangefinder, a thermal tracking sight and a television tracking sight.

=== Chassis ===
The launch vehicle of the HQ-17 integrates both missile and radar systems on a single chassis, capable of operating independently without other battery vehicles.

The tracked chassis weighs around 32 metric tons and has dimensions of 8 m long, 3.2 m tall, and 4 m wide. It is reportedly powered by a roughly 750-800 hp diesel engine and has a maximum speed of 65 km/h and a range of 600 km.

The wheeled launch vehicle is produced by Dongfeng Motor Corporation and is a 6x6 chassis similar to a Belarusian MZKT-6922. The vehicle weighs around 30 tons and is about 9.7 m long, 3.1 m tall, and 3.7 m wide. The vehicle includes an all-wheel drive transmission, a central tire inflation system, and a lightly armored hull that protects against small arms fire and shell splinters. It is reportedly powered by a diesel engine of roughly 400 horsepower and has a maximum speed of 80 km/h and a range of 800 km.

One major improvement of the wheeled variant was the capability to fire on the move.

== Deployment ==
The HQ-17 tracked version and HQ-17A wheeled version are both currently in service in the People's Liberation Army Ground Force.

In May 2021, around two batteries of HQ-17A entered service in China's Xinjiang Military Command at an altitude of more than 4500 m alongside two batteries of PHL-11 MLRS.

== Variants ==
HQ-17
Tracked variant
HQ-17A
Wheeled variant (NATO reporting name: CH-SA-15B)
FM-2000
Export-oriented wheeled variant based on HQ-17A. Featured upgraded electronic countermeasures (ECM) in the form of counter-jamming capability against multiple targets.
HQ-17AE
An export variant based on wheeled HQ-17A.
CASIC Anti-UAV System
Debuted at Zhuhai Airshow 2022. It comprises the HQ-17AE and QW-12 short-range missiles, DK-1 low-altitude search radar, ZR-1500 drone defense system, and the ZK-K20 ground station.

== Operators ==
China

- People's Liberation Army Ground Force - 200 HQ-17, 50 HQ-17A as of 2023

Pakistan

- Pakistan Air Force - HQ-17AE

Saudi Arabia

- HQ-17AE

Serbia

- HQ-17AE

Tajikistan

- HQ-17AE

== Bibliography ==
- International Institute for Strategic Studies (February 2024). The Military Balance 2024. London: Routledge. ISBN 9781032780047.

== See also ==
- List of surface-to-air missiles
