= Sevom Khordad =

Iranian aerial defense system

Sevom Khordad/3rd Khordad
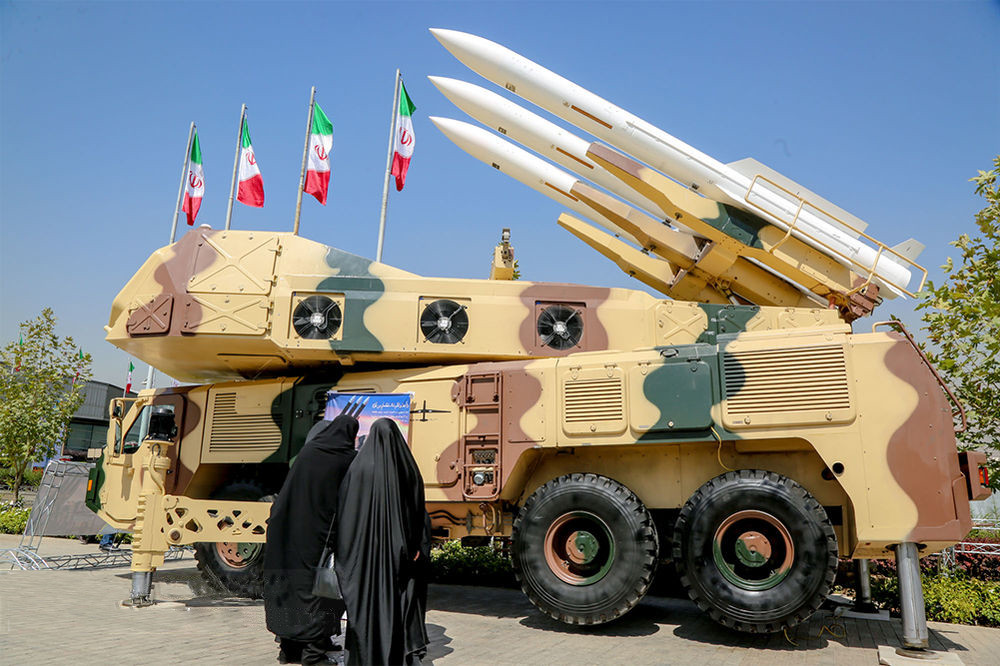
- The specific 3rd Khordad TELAR that shot down an RQ-4 drone in 2019, according to Iran
- Type: Aerial defense system
- Place of origin: Iran

Service history
- In service: 2016–present
- Used by: See § Operators
- Wars: 2019–2020 Persian Gulf crisis Twelve-Day War; 2026 Iran War

Specifications
- Main armament: Taer-2B
- Secondary armament: Sayyad-2
- Engine: IVECO diesel
- Operational range: 50–200 km
- Flight altitude: 25–30 km

The Sevom Khordad or 3rd Khordad (Israeli reporting name: SA-65) is an Iranian road-mobile medium range air defense missile system that was first unveiled on 11 May 2014. It is believed to be an upgraded version of the Ra'ad air defense system and somewhat superior to the other version of the Ra'ad, the Tabas (air defense system), although it is more similar to the Ra'ad than the Tabas is. Its operational capabilities were confirmed when it shot down an American Northrop Grumman RQ-4 Global Hawk near the Strait of Hormuz. It is named after the Liberation of Khorramshahr which occurred on 3rd Khordad on the Persian Calendar.

== Characteristics ==
It shows some resemblance to the Buk-M2. In terms of performance, it is "often compared to the Russian Buk family." Each Sevom Khordad TELAR can carry 3 Taer-2B missiles which have range of 50–105 km and can engage targets at altitudes of 25–30 km. The Sevom Khordad utilizes an X-band Active Phased array engagement radar, each 3rd Khordad TELAR can simultaneously detect 100 targets, engage 4 and guide 2 missiles on a target. Each battery of Sevom Khordad Battery consists of one TELAR and two TELs and hence has 9 ready-to-fire missiles, each battalion has four batteries and hence can engage 16 targets simultaneously. Each battalion also includes a Bashir 3-D S-band Phased array Surveillance radar which has a detection range of 350 km. The battalion also has a Command and Control (C2) Unit which provides communication with other air defense systems and hence establishes a network of air defenses. It can also provide additional Data link in case of Radar jamming. In addition to the Taer-2B, the Sevom Khordad can also be equipped with eight Dey 9 short-range missiles to engage fighters and drones.

== Operational history ==
On 20 June 2019, Iran shot down a United States RQ-4A Global Hawk BAMS-D surveillance drone with a surface-to-air missile over the Strait of Hormuz, using what it said was 3rd Khordad Air defence system, though a US official instead said the attack had used a S-125 Neva/Pechora system. According to Iranian officials the drone was shot down 8.3 mi (13.4 km) off the Iranian coast, though the United States denied this, saying the closest the drone got to Iran's border was 21 mi (34 km).

=== Twelve-Day War ===
On 17 June 2025, the Israeli army released a video of an attack on a Sevom Khordad air defense system.

=== 2026 Iran War ===
On 28 February 2026, the IDF says it completed a wave of strikes targeting strategic Iranian air defenses. Among them was the Sevom Khordad air defense system, with its infrastructure located in Kermanshah. Reporting name SA-65.

== Operators ==
=== Current ===
- Iran: Islamic Revolutionary Guard Corps Aerospace Force
