= Taer 2 =

Iranian medium-range surface-to-air missile

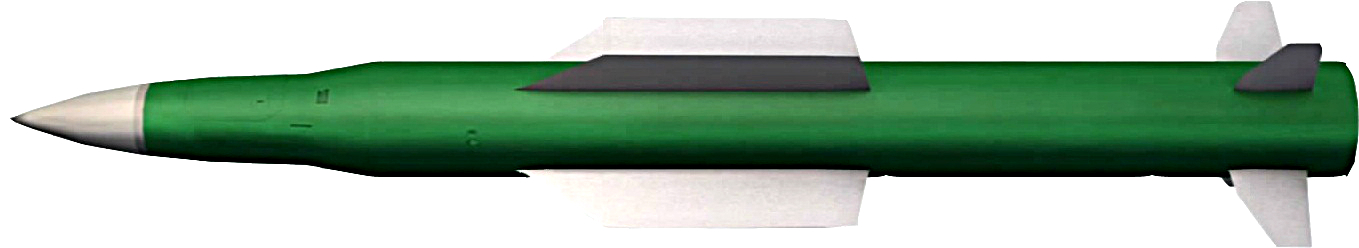
- A Taer 2 missile
- Type: Surface-to-air missile
- Place of origin: Iran

Service history
- Used by: IRGC AF

Production history
- Designer: IRGC AF
- Designed: 21 September 2012
- Variants: Taer-1; Taer-2A (Tabas (air defense system)); Taer-2B (3rd Khordad)

Specifications
- Warhead: Frag-HE
- Detonation mechanism: proximity fuse
- Propellant: Solid propellant
- Operational range: 50 km
- Flight ceiling: 25-27 km(75000 ft)
- Guidance system: Active radar homing
- Launch platform: Ra'ad

The Taer 2 (Persian: طائر, meaning "bird") is an Iranian mid-range radar guided solid fueled surface-to-air missile (SAM) designed to defend against aerial threats at altitudes of up to 25–27 km (75000 ft) and distances of up to 50 km. It is meant for use as part of the Ra'ad air defense system, and was revealed during a military parade in Tehran on 21 September 2012. It shows similarities to the Soviet 9M317 missile just as the Raad air defense system does to the Buk missile system.

== History ==
During Velayat 91 maneuvers in December 2012 the Iranian Navy successfully tested the Raad Air Defense System but it is not clear if the Raad missile tested in Iranian Navy is the same one as the Taer-2 missile of Raad system designed by the IRGC Aerospace Force.
