= Bavar-373 =

Iranian long range surface-to-air missile

Bavar 373
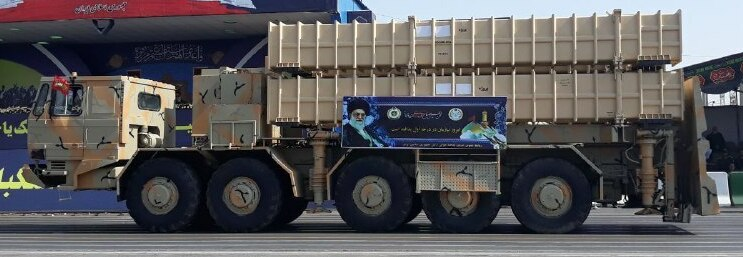
- Bavar 373 TEL
- Type: Mobile long range surface-to-air missile
- Place of origin: Iran

Service history
- In service: August 2019
- Used by: See § Operators

Production history
- Produced: 2014–present

Specifications

Bavar-373 (Persian: باور-۳۷۳, meaning Belief and 373 being Abjad numerals for یا رسول‌الله or O, Messenger of Allah!) is an Iranian long-range road-mobile surface-to-air missile system unveiled in August 2016. Iran describes it as a competitor of the S-300 missile system. It is manufactured by the Iranian Defence Ministry in cooperation with unspecified local manufacturers and universities.

The system was formally unveiled during a ceremony attended by the Iranian President Hassan Rouhani on 22 August 2019, and was declared operational the same day.

An upgraded version was unveiled in 2022. Iran described it as a competitor to the S-400.

== History ==
After the Russian ban on exporting S-300 to Iran (which was lifted in 2015), Iran decided to develop a similar system domestically: "We have planned to build a long-range air defence missile system similar to S-300. By God's grace and by the Iranian engineers' efforts, we will reach self-sufficiency in this regard."

It was later revealed that the name of the system will be Bavar 373. Bavar meaning "belief" and 373 which is the Abjad number of prophet Muhammad's name. Farzad Esmaieli, commander of Khatam al-Anbiya Construction Headquarters told Iranian media that the development of this system started by the direct order of supreme leader Ayatollah Khamenei when the first information about cancellation of S-300 contract was revealed and Iranian personnel were still being trained in Russia on it. He said the project was in the stage of prototype designing and that it was not going to suffer from the weak points of the S-300. He continued that in the area of detection and radars, a very good point was reached and defense ministry was working on two or three missiles each for a different range and altitude. He said that the design was complete, all the parts were going to be manufactured inside the country and it had a good ability to detect and intercept enemy aircraft. According to Iranian military sources, the system is much more capable than S-300P class.

The first prototype was built on 22 November 2011.

The Iranian defense ministry is due to equip the country's Armed Forces with a new long-range air-defence system by 21 March 2013, a senior Iranian military official announced on Saturday August 25, 2012. On 3 September 2012, Farzad Esmaili said that the development of the system was now 30 percent complete. On 1 January 2013, the same commander announced that the sub-systems of the homemade air-defense system are being tested in laboratory.

Esmaili updated his estimate in February 2014 and said the system would be ready by the end of 2015.

On 21 August 2016, Iran revealed components of Bavar-373. According to Janes international: "Bavar-373 displayed on 21 August is clearly a unique Iranian system that appears to reflect extensive investment in its ability to develop phased array radars".

On 16 August 2019, the Iranian MOD said the Bavar 373 was ready to be delivered to the Iranian armed forces.

In April 2022, reports surfaced which claimed that Iran had transferred a Bavar-373 system to Russia for use in the Russian invasion of Ukraine. Iran Foreign Minister Amir Abdolhainnan refuted allegations of arms transfers to Russia in a call with Ukraine Foreign Minister Dmytro Kuleba.

== Design ==
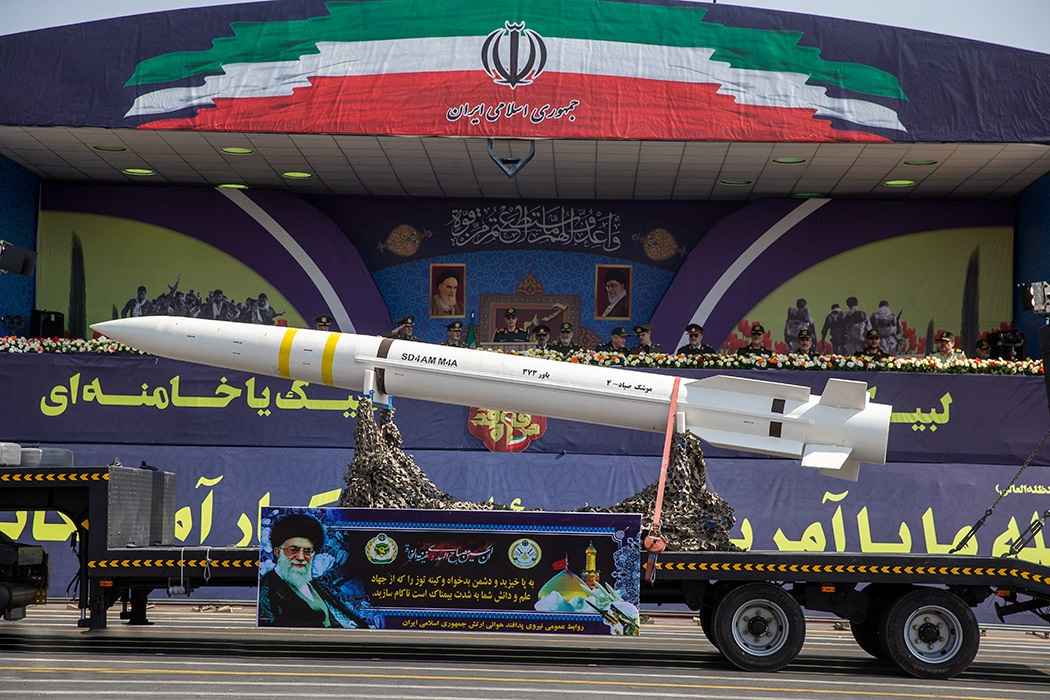
Sayyad-4 missile of the Bavar-373 system parades in front of Iranian officials during Sacred Defence Week

Bavar-373 utilizes Sayyad-4 missiles, which are contained in two rectangular launch canisters. No formal information was given about this missile, but it appears from news photos that Sayyad-4 is similar to Sayyad-3 in wings and control surfaces; however, it varies slightly in frontal shape.

The canisters containing the Sayyad-4 missiles are carried on the Zoljanah 10×10 truck.

Bavar-373 uses a phased array radar for tracking aerodynamic targets and ballistic missiles in medium to long ranges, mounted on the ZAFAR heavy truck. Iran claims that it can track up to 200 targets simultaneously.

== Operators ==
- Iran - Islamic Republic of Iran Air Defense Force

== See also ==
- Equipment of the Iranian Army
- Military of Iran
