= Sayyad (missile) =

Iranian surface-to-air missile family

Sayyad (Hunter)
- A Sayyad-2 system of the Islamic Republic of Iran Air Defense Force in 2015.
- Type: Mobile long range surface-to-air missile with anti-ballistic missile capability
- Place of origin: Iran

Service history
- In service: 2015–present
- Used by: Iran

Production history
- Designed: 2011 or earlier

Specifications
- Warhead: Frag-HE
- Propellant: Solid fuel
- Operational range: Sayyad-2: 40–45 km Sayyad-2C: up to 75 km Sayyad-3: 120-150 km Sayyad-3G: 150 km Sayyad-4: 210 km Sayyad-4B: 400 km
- Flight altitude: Sayyad-2: up to 27 km Sayyad-2C: up to 30 km Sayyad-3: 27-30 km Sayyad-4: 30-40 km
- Maximum speed: Sayyad-2: Mach 3.6-4; Sayyad-2C: Mach 4.5+ Sayyad-3: Mach 4.5-5.1; Sayyad-3F: Mach 5 Sayyad-3G: Mach 7

Sayyad (Persian: صیاد, Hunter) is a series of solid fuel surface-to-air missiles (SAM) manufactured by Iran.

== Sayyad-1 ==
Sayyad-1 is an Iranian variant of the Chinese HQ-2 surface-to-air missile using some domestic components.

== Sayyad-2 ==
Sayyad-2 is a canister-launched, reverse engineered version of the RIM-66 Standard Missile (SM-1) naval surface-to-air missile that Iran obtained from the United States before the 1979 revolution. It is an upgraded version of the Sayyad-1 system with higher precision, range and defensive power. The range of the Sayyad-2 missile is not known. Different sources claim various numbers, from 60 km to 120 km.

After the unveiling ceremony in November 2013, it became clear that the Sayyad-2 missile looked similar to the SM-2 Standard SAM missile but its control fins were similar to the Iranian medium-range TAER-2 SAM missile. It was also announced that it will have cooperation with the S-200 system via TALASH-2 interface system. It was planned that the Sayyad-2 missile will be added to Iranian Moudge-class frigates. Iranian defense minister announced that Sayyad-2 covered the medium range and high altitudes and had a combined guidance system.

On 17 May 2024, Sayyad-2 missiles were allegedly spotted with Hezbollah after an airstrike.

=== Variant ===
Mehrab is a naval version of the Sayyad-2.

== Sayyad-3 ==
Sayyad-3 is a similar missile, but with a long-range capability. It has a similar diameter as Sayyad-2 but a longer body with different wings and control surfaces. Based on current estimates Sayyad-3 has a range of about 150–200 km. Iranian Defence Minister Hossein Dehghan stated the maximum range is about 120 km. This missile will be added to SAM systems via the TALASH-3 system. Iran claims that the system can also detect stealth targets from a distance of 85 kilometres (53 miles) and can intercept and destroy them within a range of 45 kilometres (28 miles), although there is no evidence that this is the case.

It appears that two new above missiles will be used in a similar manner to the Iranian long-range SAM system Bavar-373, to cover various ranges and altitudes.

== Sayyad-3G ==
Sayyad-3G was revealed on 21 February 2026.

Sayyad-3G was made to help the Islamic Republic of Iran improve its naval air defense. The missile is intended to provide regional air defense coverage for Shahid Soleimani-class vessels. Shahid Soleimani-class ships, such as the Shahid Sayyad Shirazi, are fast catamarans outfitted with defense and anti-ship missile systems, and they are equipped with the Sayyad-3G.

== Sayyad-4 ==
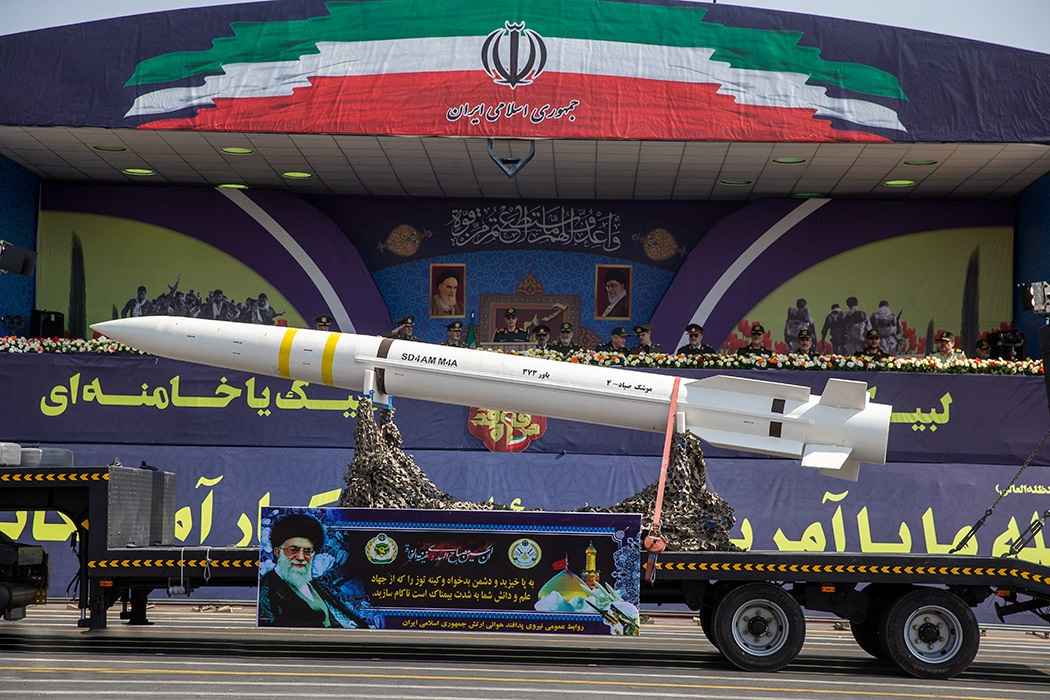
Sayyad-4

Sayyad-4 is surface-to-air missile (SAM) developed for use with the Bavar-373 air defense system. It was designed in September 2014 and entered production in 2019. The missile was produced by Khatam al-Anbia Air Defense Base and the Ministry of Defense.

The Sayyad-4 missile has a length of 7.5 meters, a diameter of 515 mm, a total weight of 2,050 kilograms, and carries a 180-kilogram warhead. It uses inertial mid-course guidance updated via datalink and employs either semi-active or active radar homing in the terminal phase.

Sayyad-4 belongs to the Sayyad missile family but is larger than the previous generations and has undergone continuous upgrades. Due to its larger size, it uses a vertical launching system and a hot-launch method. The missile uses composite solid fuel and is equipped with proximity and direct-impact detonation mechanisms. It has a flight ceiling of 27 kilometres (89,000 ft) and a speed of Mach 6 to Mach 8.

== Sayyad-4B ==
Sayyad-4B was revealed on 6 November 2022. It is paired with the Bavar-373 air defense system.

The missile uses hybrid solid fuel and successfully engaged a target at a distance of over 300 kilometers during testing. Earlier engagement capability had been reported at 200 kilometers.

With the introduction of Sayyad-4B, the Bavar-373 radar detection range increased from 350 to 450 kilometers, and the tracking range improved from 260 to approximately 405 kilometers. The engagement altitude increased from 27 to 32 kilometers. During testing, a target drone was destroyed at an altitude of 40,000 feet (12 km).

== See also ==
- Mersad
- Raad (air defense system)
- Ya Zahra
