= Haseb (rocket) =

- Type: Artillery rocket
- Place of origin: Iran

Specifications
- Diameter: 107 mm
- Payload capacity: 8 kg
- Operational range: 9 km
- Launch platform: 12-tube MLRS

The Haseb rocket is an Iranian 107 mm Artillery rocket derived from the Chinese Type 63 multiple rocket launcher. It is mounted on a Haseb (same name) Multiple Launch Rocker System (MLRS) with 12-tube 2-wheel split rail similar to that of the Type 63 multiple rocket launcher. The rocket has a range of 9 km and a warhead weighing 8 kg.

== Operators ==
- Iran
- Hezbollah

== See also ==
- Oghab
- Noor
- Shahin
- Arash
- Yaqeen-1
