= MIM-23 Hawk =

American surface-to-air missile family

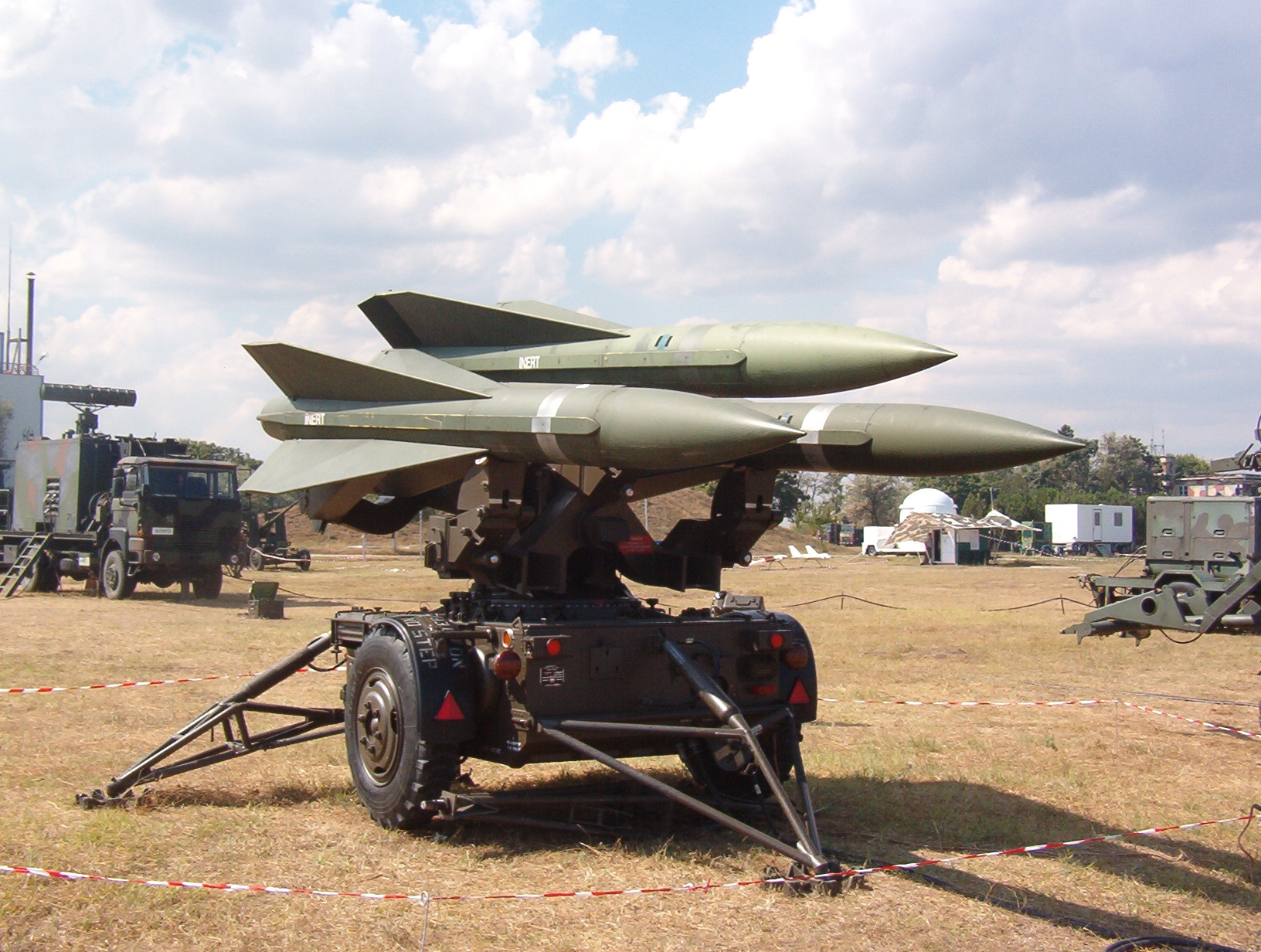
- Type: Surface-to-air missile
- Place of origin: United States

Service history
- In service: August 1960–present
- Wars: Cold War; War of Attrition; Chadian–Libyan War; Iran–Iraq War; Gulf War; Second Libyan Civil War; 2020 Turkish intervention in Libya; Russo-Ukrainian War; Russian invasion of Ukraine

Production history
- Manufacturer: Raytheon Company

Specifications
- Mass: 1,290 pounds (590 kg)
- Length: 16 feet 8 inches (5.08 m)
- Diameter: 14.5 inches (370 mm)
- Wingspan: 3 feet 11 inches (1.19 m)
- Warhead: 119 pounds (54 kg) blast fragmentation warhead
- Engine: solid-fuel rocket engine
- Operational range: 28–31 mi (45–50 km)
- Flight ceiling: 65,000 feet (20,000 m)
- Maximum speed: Mach 2.4
- Guidance system: Semi-active radar homing

The Raytheon MIM-23 HAWK ("Homing All the Way Killer") is an American medium-range surface-to-air missile. It was designed to be a much more mobile counterpart to the MIM-14 Nike Hercules, trading off range and altitude capability for a much smaller size and weight. Its low-level performance was greatly improved over Nike through the adoption of new radars and a continuous wave semi-active radar homing guidance system. It entered service with the US Army in 1959.

In 1971, it underwent a major improvement program as the Improved Hawk, or I-Hawk, which made several improvements to the missile and replaced all of the radar systems with new models. Improvements continued throughout the next twenty years, adding improved ECCM, a potential home-on-jam feature, and in 1995, a new warhead that made it capable against short-range tactical ballistic missiles. Jane's reported that the original system's single shot kill probability was 0.56; I-Hawk improved this to 0.85.

Hawk was superseded by the MIM-104 Patriot in US Army service by 1994. The last US user was the US Marine Corps, who used theirs until 2002 when they were replaced with the man-portable short-range FIM-92 Stinger. The missile was also produced outside the US in Western Europe, Japan and Iran. The US never used the Hawk in combat, but it has been employed numerous times by other nations. Approximately 40,000 of the missiles were produced.

== Development ==
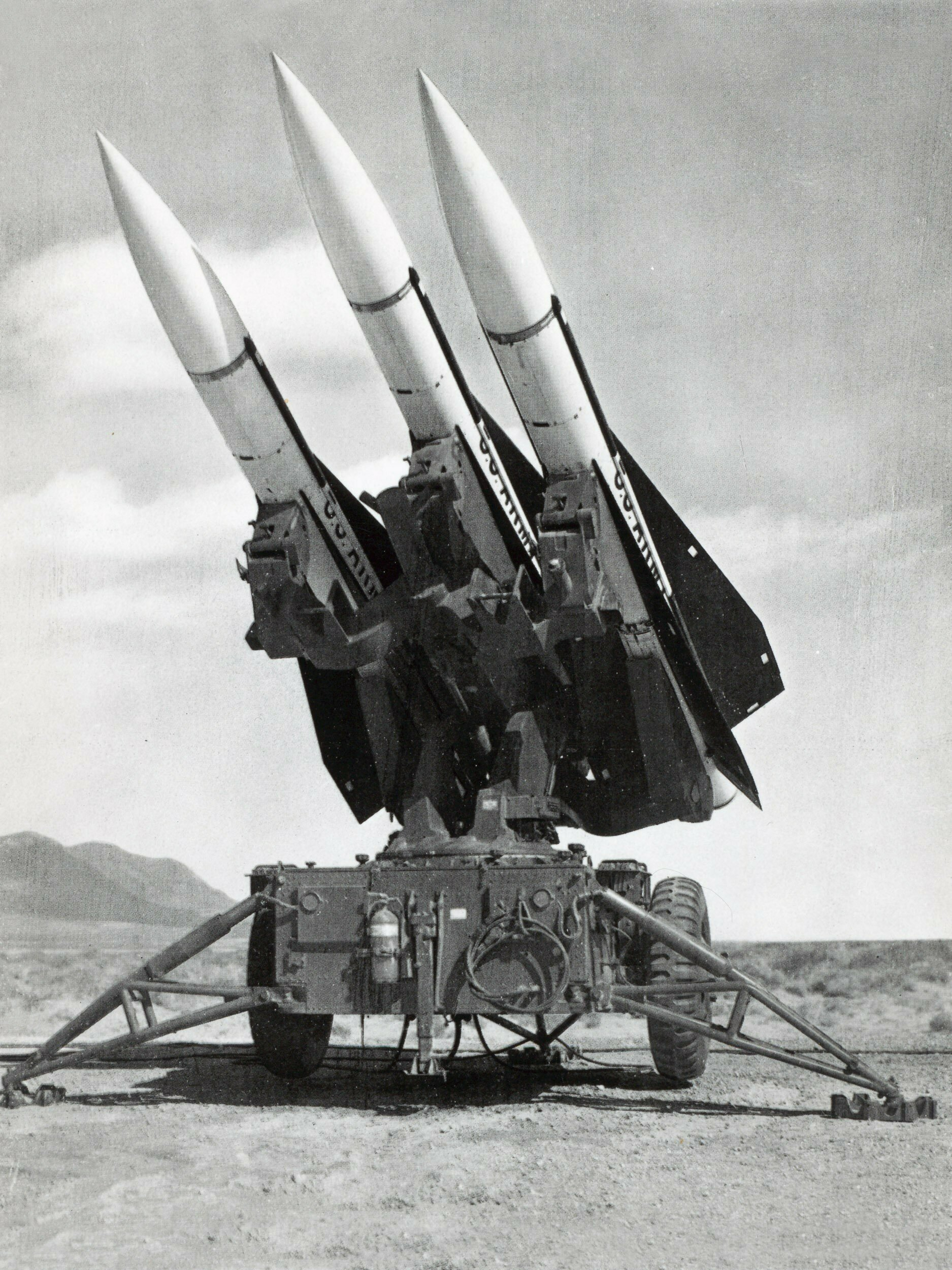
The original iteration of the missile, MIM-23A later known as the Basic Hawk.

Development of the Hawk missile system began in 1952, when the United States Army began studies into a medium-range semi-active radar homing surface-to-air missile. In July 1954, development contracts were awarded to Northrop for the launcher, radars and fire control systems, while Raytheon was awarded the contract for the missile. The first test launch of the missile then designated the XSAM-A-18 happened in June 1956.

By July 1957, development was completed, by which time the designation had changed to XM3 and XM3E1. Very early missiles used the Aerojet M22E7 which was not reliable. The problems were resolved with the adoption of the M22E8 engine.

The missile was initially deployed by the US Army in 1959, and by the US Marine Corps in 1960.

The high complexity of the system, and the quality of tube-based electronics, gave the radars in the early Hawk systems a mean time between failures (MTBF) of only 43 hours. The improved Hawk system increased this to between 130 and 170 hours. Later Hawk versions improved this further to between 300 and 400 hours.

Improved Hawk or I-Hawk The original Hawk system had problems engaging targets at low altitude—the missile would have problems picking the target out against ground clutter. The US Army began a program to address these issues in 1964 via the Hawk Improvement Program (Hawk/HIP). This involved numerous upgrades to the Hawk system:

- A digital data processing central information coordinator for target processing, threat ordering, and intercept evaluation.
- An improved missile (MIM-23B) with a larger warhead, smaller and more powerful M112 motor, and improved guidance section.
- The PAR, CWAR, HPIR, and ROR were replaced by upgraded variants (see #Radars).

The system entered service during 1972, the first unit reaching operational status by October. All US units were upgraded to I-Hawk standard by 1978.

Product Improvement Plan In 1973 the US Army started an extensive multi-phase Hawk PIP (Product Improvement Plan), mainly intended to improve and upgrade the numerous items of ground equipment.

- Phase I
  Phase I involved replacement of the CWAR with the AN/MPQ-55 Improved CWAR (ICWAR), and the upgrade of the AN/MPQ-50 PAR to Improved PAR (IPAR) configuration by the addition of a digital MTI (Moving Target Indicator). The first PIP Phase I systems were fielded between 1979 and 1981.
- Phase II
  Developed from 1978 and fielded between 1983 and 1986. upgraded the AN/MPQ-46 HPI to AN/MPQ-57 standard by replacing some of the vacuum tube based electronics with modern solid-state circuits, and added an optical TAS (Tracking Adjunct System). The TAS, designated OD-179/TVY, is an electro-optical (TV) tracking system that increases Hawk operability and survivability in a high-ECM environment.
- Phase III
  The PIP Phase III development was started in 1983, and was first fielded by U.S. forces in 1989. Phase III was a major upgrade which significantly enhanced the computer hardware and software for most components of the system, a new CWAR the AN/MPQ-62, added single-scan target detection capability, and upgraded the HPI to AN/MPQ-61 standard by addition of a Low-Altitude Simultaneous Hawk Engagement (LASHE) system. LASHE allows the Hawk system to counter saturation attacks by simultaneously intercepting multiple low-level targets. The ROR was phased out in Phase III Hawk units.

Hawk Missile Restore Reliability (MRR)

This was a program that ran between 1982 and 1984 intended to improve missile reliability.

Hawk ECCM

Running alongside the MMR program, this produced ECCM to specific threats, probably contemporary Soviet ECM pods such as the SPS-141 fitted to the Su-22, which proved moderately effective during the Iran–Iraq War. The MIM-23C and E missiles contain these fixes.

Low clutter enhancements

Upgrades to the missile that takes it up to MIM-23G that enable the missile to deal with low flying targets in a high clutter environment. These were first deployed in 1990.

Hawk missile ILM (Improved Lethality Modification)

To improve the lethality of the warhead of the missile against ballistic missiles, the warhead was redesigned to produce fewer larger fragments, typically 35 grams each and thus comparable to a 12.7 mm projectile in mass.

Hawk mobility and TMD upgrades

A Hawk mobility survivability enhancement programme has been developed following experience in the 1990 Gulf War. The aim of this programme was to reduce the number of support vehicles per battery and to increase survivability. Upgrades to the launcher allow missiles to be transported on the launcher itself, as well as replacing vacuum tubes with a single-board computer. A north finding system speeds orientation and launcher alignment. A field wire replaces heavy cables and allows for greater dispersion amongst battery vehicles from 360 ft (110 m) to 1.2 mi (2 km). The upgrades were deployed by the US Marine Corps between early 1995 and September 1996.

Phase IV

With both the Army and Marines abandoning the Hawk, Phase IV was never completed. It was planned to include:
- High mobility continuous wave acquisition radar to improve detection of small UAVs.
- A new CW engagement radar.
- Anti-radiation missile decoys.
- An improved missile motor.
- An upgraded electro-optical tracker.
- Improved command and control.
- ATBM upgrades.

Hawk XXI (Hawk 21)

The Hawk XXI or Hawk-21 is a more advanced, and more compact version of Hawk PIP-3 upgrade. Hawk-XXI basically eliminates the PAR and CWAR radars with the introduction of 3D MPQ-64 Sentinel radars. Norway's Kongsberg Company provides an FDC (Fire Distribution Center) as it is used in NASAMS system in Norway. The missiles are upgraded MIM-23K standard with an improved blast-fragmentation warhead that creates a larger lethal zone. The system is also effective against short-range tactical ballistic missiles.
A MPQ-61 HIPIR radar provides low altitude and local area radar coverage as well as continuous wave radar illumination for the MIM-23K Hawk missiles.

== Description ==
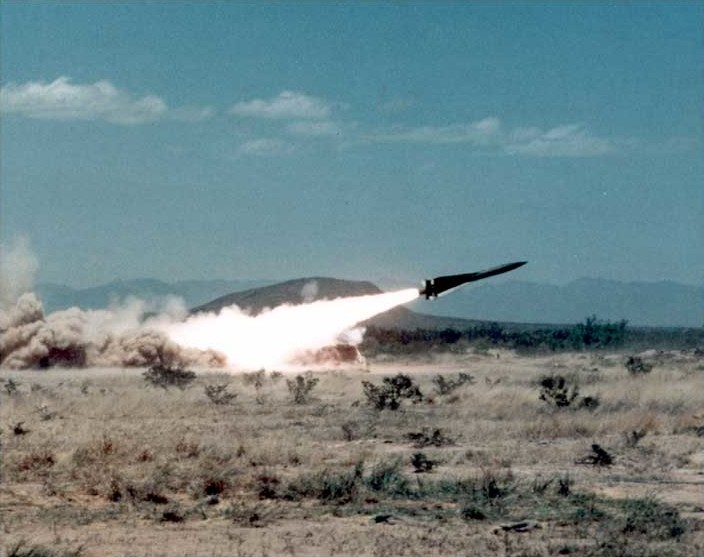
A launch of a Hawk missile

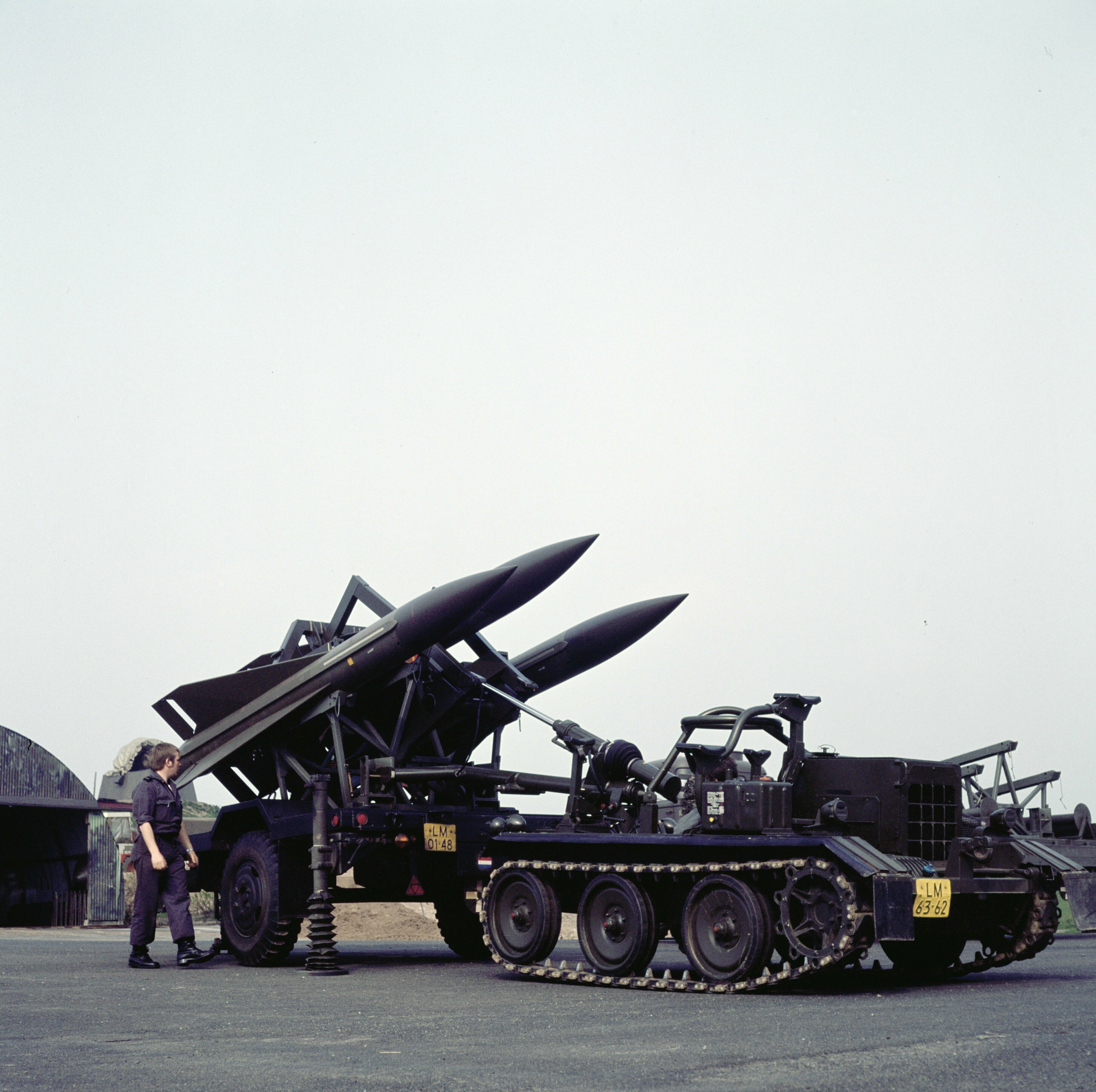
Reloading a Hawk launcher with the assistance of the M501 missile loading tractor.

The Hawk system consists of a large number of component elements. These elements were typically fitted on wheeled trailers making the system semi-mobile. During the system's 40-year life span, these components were continually upgraded.

The Hawk missile is transported and launched from the M192 towed triple-missile launcher. A self-propelled Hawk launcher, the SP-Hawk, was fielded in 1969, which simply mounted the launcher on a tracked M727 (modified M548), however the project was dropped and all activity terminated in August 1971.

The missile is propelled by a dual thrust motor, with a boost phase and a sustain phase. The MIM-23A missiles were fitted with an M22E8 motor which burns for 25 to 32 seconds. The MIM-23B and later missiles are fitted with an M112 motor with a 5-second boost phase and a sustain phase of around 21 seconds. The M112 motor has greater thrust, thus increasing the engagement envelope.

The original MIM-23A missiles used a parabolic reflector, but the antenna directional focus was insufficient, when engaging low-flying targets the missile would dive on them, only to lose them in the ground clutter. The MIM-23B I-Hawk missiles and later uses a low side lobe, high-gain plane antenna to reduce sensitivity to ground clutter in addition to an inverted receiver developed in the late 1960s to give the missile enhanced ECCM ability and to increase the Doppler frequency resolution.

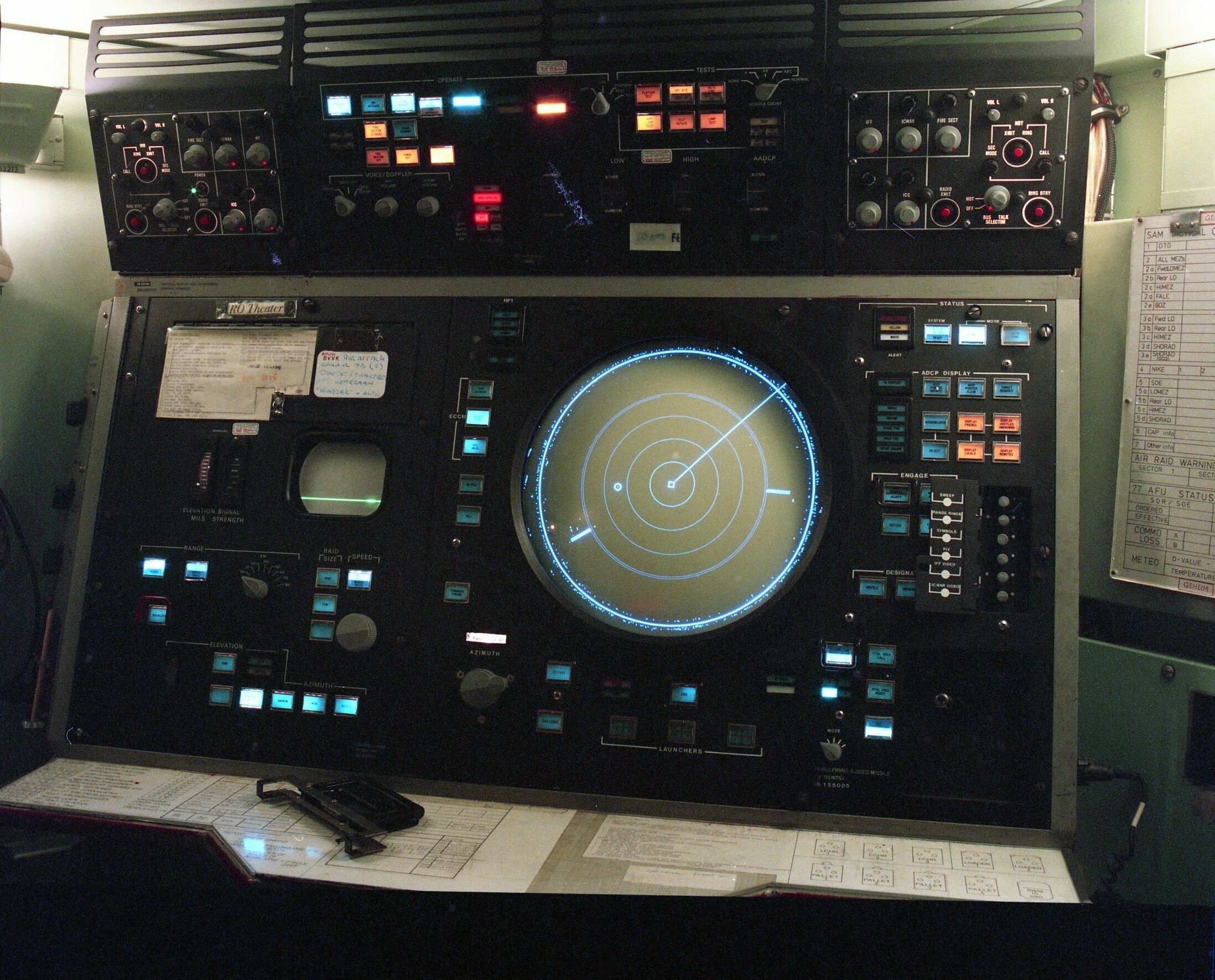
The radar display contained in the Tactical Display and Engagement Control Console (TDECC).

A typical Basic Hawk battery consists of:

- 1 × PAR: Pulse Acquisition Radar—a search radar with a 20 rpm rotation, for high/medium altitude target detection.
- 1 × CWAR: Continuous Wave Acquisition Radar—a search doppler radar with a 20 rpm rotation, for low altitude target detection.
- 2 × HPIR: High Power Illuminator doppler Radar—target tracking, illumination and missile guidance.
- 1 × ROR: Range Only Radar—K-band pulse radar which provides range information when the other systems are jammed or unavailable.
- 1 × ICC: Information Coordination Central
- 1 × BCC: Battery Control Central
- 1 × AFCC: Assault Fire Command Console—miniature battery control central for remote control of one firing section of the battery. The AFCC controls one CWAR, one HPI, and three launchers with a total of nine missiles.
- 1 × PCP: Platoon Command Post
- 2 × LCS: Launcher Section Controls
- 6 × M-192: Launchers with 18 missiles.
- 6 × SEA: Generators 56 kVA (400 Hz) each.
- 12 × M-390: Missile transport pallets with 36 missiles
- 3 × M-501: Missile loading tractors.
- 1 × bucket loader
- 1 × Missile test shop AN/MSM-43.

A typical Phase-III Hawk battery consists of:

- 1 × PAR: Pulse Acquisition Radar—a search radar with a 20 (+/−2) rpm rotation, for high/medium altitude target detection.
- 1 × CWAR: Continuous Wave Acquisition Radar—a search doppler radar with a 20 (+/−2) rpm rotation, for low altitude target detection.
- 2 × HIPIR: HIgh Power Illuminator doppler Radar—target tracking, illumination and missile guidance.
- 1 × FDC: Fire Direction Center
- 1 × IFF: Identification Friend or Foe Transceiver
- 6 × DLN: Digital Launchers with 18 missiles.
- 6 × MEP-816: Generators 60 KW (400 Hz) each.
- 12 × M-390: Missile transport pallets with 36 missiles
- 3 × M-501: Missile loading tractors.
- 1 × [bucket loader]

== Missiles ==
Type of Missile	Entered service	Tactical model	Training and Evaluation model
Prototype	1957	XM3 (XMIM-23A)	n/a
Basic Hawk	1959	(M3); MIM-23A	XM16/18 (XMTM-23B/C)
Basic I-Hawk	1971 to 1978	MIM-23B	XMEM-23B
Improved ECCM	1982	MIM-23C/D	MEM-23C
Low-level/ multi-jamming	1990	MIM-23E/F	MEM-23D
New body section	early 1990s	MIM-23G/H	MEM-23E
New warhead and fuzing (anti-TBM)	1995	MIM-23K/J	MEM-23F
New fuzing only, old warhead	1995	MIM-23L/M	MEM-23F

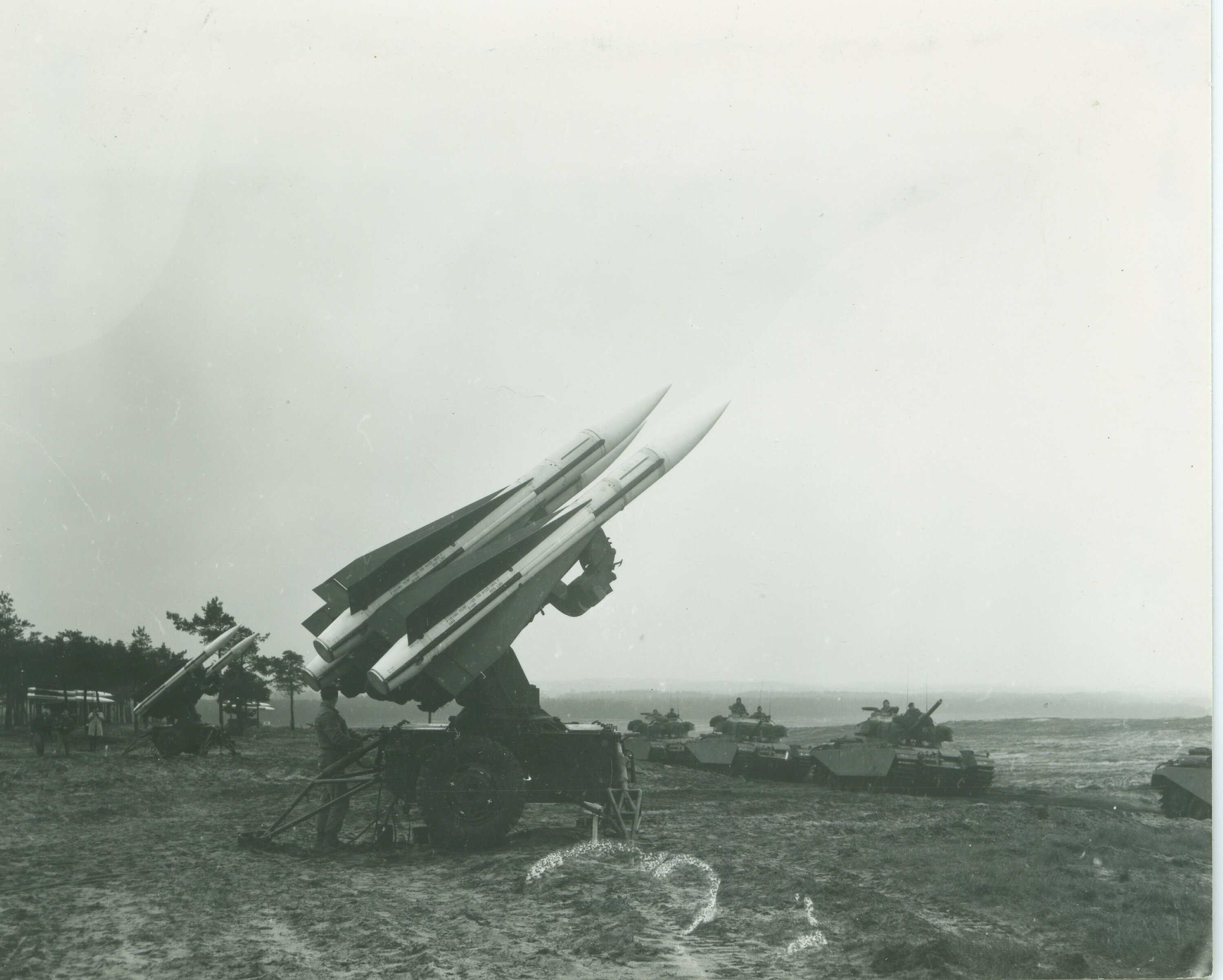
A Dutch HAWK battery provides an umbrella of protection for a tank column.

The Hawk missile has a slender cylindrical body and four long chord clipped delta-wings, extending from mid-body to the slightly tapered boat-tail. Each wing has a trailing-edge control surface.

- The MIM-23A is 16.7 feet (5.08 m) long, has a body diameter of 15 inches (0.37 m), a wing span of 48 inches (1.21 m) and weighs 1,287 pounds (584 kg) at launch with a 119-pound (54 kg) HE blast/fragmentation warhead. It has a minimum engagement range of 1.2 miles (2 km), a maximum range of 16 miles (25 km), a minimum engagement altitude of 200 feet (60 m) and a maximum engagement altitude of 36,000 feet (11,000 m).
- The MIM-23B to M versions are 16.5 ft (5.03 m) long, have a body diameter of 15 in (0.37 m) and, with a larger warhead of 165 lb (75 kg), weighing 1,407 lb (638 kg) at launch. An improved motor, with a total weight of 871 lb (395 kg) including 650 lb (295 kg) of propellant, increases the maximum range of the MIM-23B to M versions to 22 mi (35 km) and maximum engagement altitude to 59,000 ft (18,000 m). The minimum range is reduced to 0.93 mi (1.5 km). The MIM-23B has a peak velocity of around 1,100 mph (500 m/s). The missile is fitted with both radio frequency proximity and impact fuses. The guidance system uses an X-band CW monopulse semi-active radar seeker. The missile can maneuver at 15 g.

In the 1970s, NASA used surplus Hawk missiles to create the Nike Hawk sounding rocket.

=== Basic Hawk: MIM-23A ===
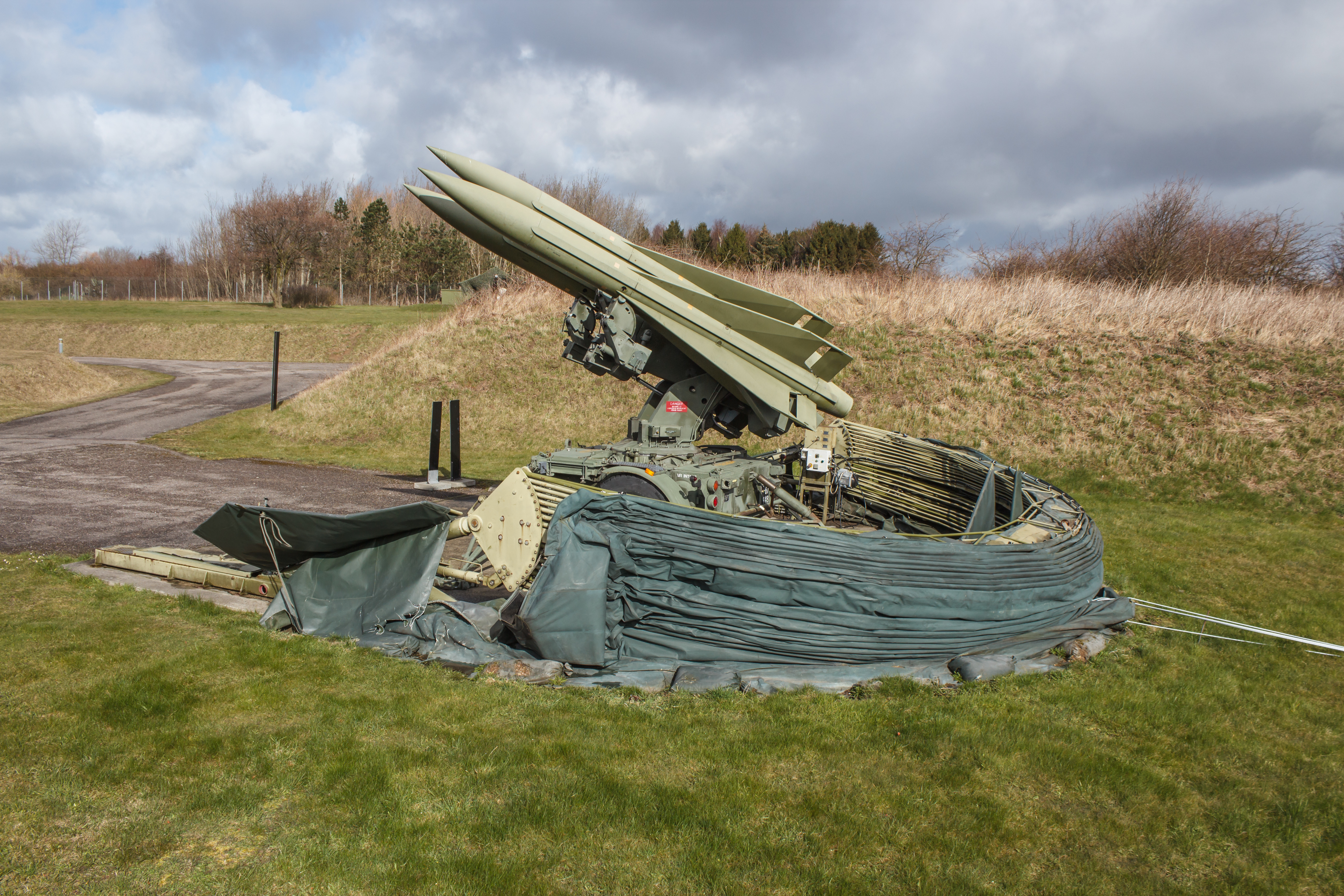
Hawk missile battery on display at a museum

The original missile used with the system. The 119 lb (54 kg) warhead produces approximately 4,000 8-gram (0.28 oz) fragments that move at approximately 4,500 mph (2,000 m/s) in an 18 degree arc.

=== I-Hawk: MIM-23B ===
The MIM-23B has a larger 163 lb (74 kg) blast-fragmentation warhead, a smaller and improved guidance package, and a new M112 rocket motor. The new warhead produces approximately 14,000 2-gram (0.071 oz) fragments that cover a much larger 70 degree arc. The missile's M112 rocket motor has a boost phase of 5 seconds and a sustain phase of 21 seconds.

The motor's total weight is 871 lb (395 kg) including 650 lb (295 kg) of propellant. This new motor improves the engagement envelope to 0.93 to 24.85 mi (1.5 to 40 km) in range at high altitude, and 1.6 to 12.4 mi (2.5 to 20 km) at low altitude. The minimum engagement altitude is 200 ft (60 m). The missile was operational in 1971. All US units had converted to this standard by 1978.

- MTM-23B training missile.
- XMEM-23B Full telemetry version for testing and evaluation purposes.

=== System components ===
"The Pentatomic Army" (1957).

The Hawk and Improved Hawk structure was integrated into one system—AN/TSQ-73 air defense missile control and coordination system, called Missile Minder or Hawk-MM. It consists of the following components: MPQ-50 Pulse Acquisition Radar, MPQ-48 Improved Continuous Wave Acquisition Radar, TSW-8 Battery Control Central, ICC Information Coordination Central, MSW-11 Platoon Command Post, MPQ-46 High Power Illuminator, MPQ-51 Range Only Radar and the M192 Launcher.

=== Improved ECCM ===
1959 Basic HAWK
1971 I Hawk
1982 Improved ECCM
1990 Improved guidance section and ECCM
Improved body section
Anti-TBM configuration
Enhanced fuse

MIM-23A
MIM-23B
MIM-23C
MIM-23D
MIM-23E	MIM-23F
MIM-23G	MIM-23H
MIM-23K	MIM-23J
MIM-23L	MIM-23M

- MIM-23C

Introduced around 1982 with improved ECCM capabilities.

- MIM-23D

Unknown upgrade to the MIM-23C. The C and D missile families remained separate until the missiles' exit from service. It is not clear exactly what the difference between the two missiles - however it seems likely that the D family missiles represent an alternative guidance system, possibly home on jam developed in response to Soviet ECM techniques that were used by Iraq during the Iran-Iraq War.

Low-level/multi-jamming

- MIM-23E/F

An upgraded to the MIM-23C/D missiles improved guidance for low-level engagements in a high-clutter/multi-jamming environment. Introduced in 1990.

New body section

- MIM-23G/H

A 1995 upgrade consisting of a new body section assembly for the MIM-23E/F missiles.

New warhead + fuzing (anti-TBM)

- MIM-23K/J

Introduced around 1994. Enhanced lethality configuration warhead with 35 gram (540 grain) fragments instead of the I-Hawks 2 gram (30 grain) fragments. MIM-23K Hawk missiles are effective up to 66,000 ft (20,000 m) altitude and up to 28 mi (45 km) in range. The missile also includes a new fuze to make it effective against ballistic missiles.

New fuzing + old warhead

- MIM-23L/M

Retains the I-Hawks 30 grain warhead, but with the new fuze.

== Radars ==
The original Hawk system used 4 or in some models 6 radars: to detect (PAR and CWAR), to track (CWAR and HPIR) and to engage (HPIR and ROR) targets. As the system was upgraded the functionality of some of the radars was merged. The final iteration of the system consists of only 2 radars, an enhanced phased array search radar and an engagement radar (HPIR).

System	Basic Hawk 1959	Improved Hawk 1971	PIP Phase I 1979	PIP Phase II 1983 to 1986	PIP Phase III 1989	Hawk XXI
PAR	AN/MPQ-35	AN/MPQ-50				AN/MPQ-64
CWAR	AN/MPQ-34	AN/MPQ-48	AN/MPQ-55		AN/MPQ-62	AN/MPQ-64
HPIR	AN/MPQ-33/39	AN/MPQ-46		AN/MPQ-57	AN/MPQ-61	
ROR	AN/MPQ-37	AN/MPQ-51			none	

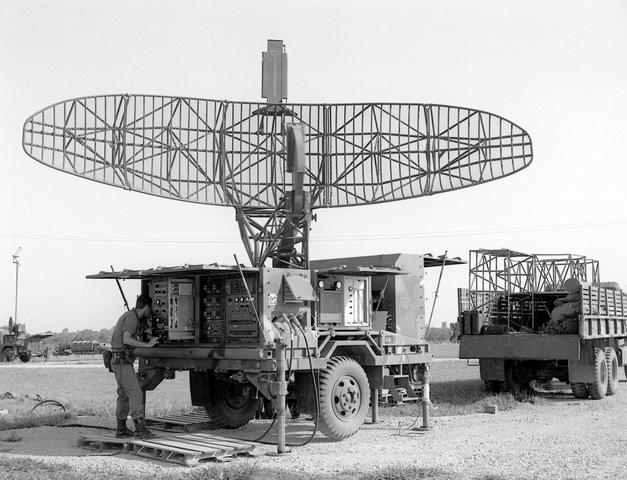
A Hawk PAR radar

PAR Pulse Acquisition Radar

The pulse acquisition radar is a long-range, high-altitude search radar.

- AN/MPQ-35 (Basic Hawk)

The search radar used with the basic Hawk system, with a radar pulse power of 450 kW and a pulse length of 3 μs, a Pulse Repetition Frequency of 800 and 667 Hz alternately. The radar operates in the 1.25 to 1.35 GHz range. The antenna is a 22.0 ft × 4.6 ft (6.7 m × 1.4 m) elliptical reflector of open lattice construction, mounted on a small two-wheeled trailer. Rotation rate is 20 rpm, the BCC – Battery Control Central and the CWAR are synchronized by the PAR revolutions and the PAR system trigger.

- AN/MPQ-50 (Improved Hawk to Phase III)

Introduced with the I-Hawk system, the improved-PAR. The system introduces a digital MTI (Moving Target Indicator) that helps separate targets from ground clutter. It operates in the 500 to 1,000 MHz (C-band) frequency range with radar pulse power of 450 kW.

- Range (source Janes):
  - 65 mi (104 km) (high PRF) to 60 mi (96 km) (low PRF) versus 32 ft^{2} (3 m^{2}) target.
  - 61 mi (98 km)(high PRF) to 56 mi (90 km) (low PRF) versus 26 ft^{2} (2.4 m^{2}) target.
  - 49 mi (79 km) (high PRF) to 45 mi (72 km) (low PRF) versus 11 ft^{2} (1 m^{2}) target.

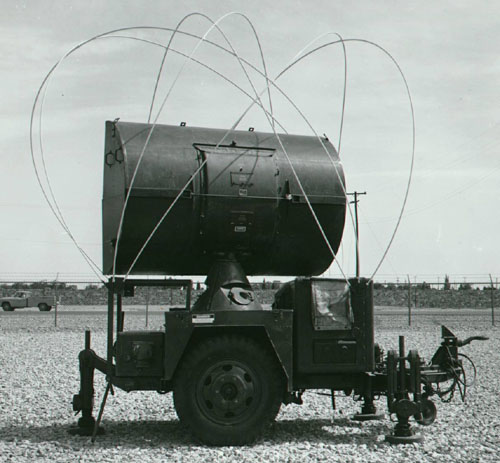
A Hawk CWAR radar

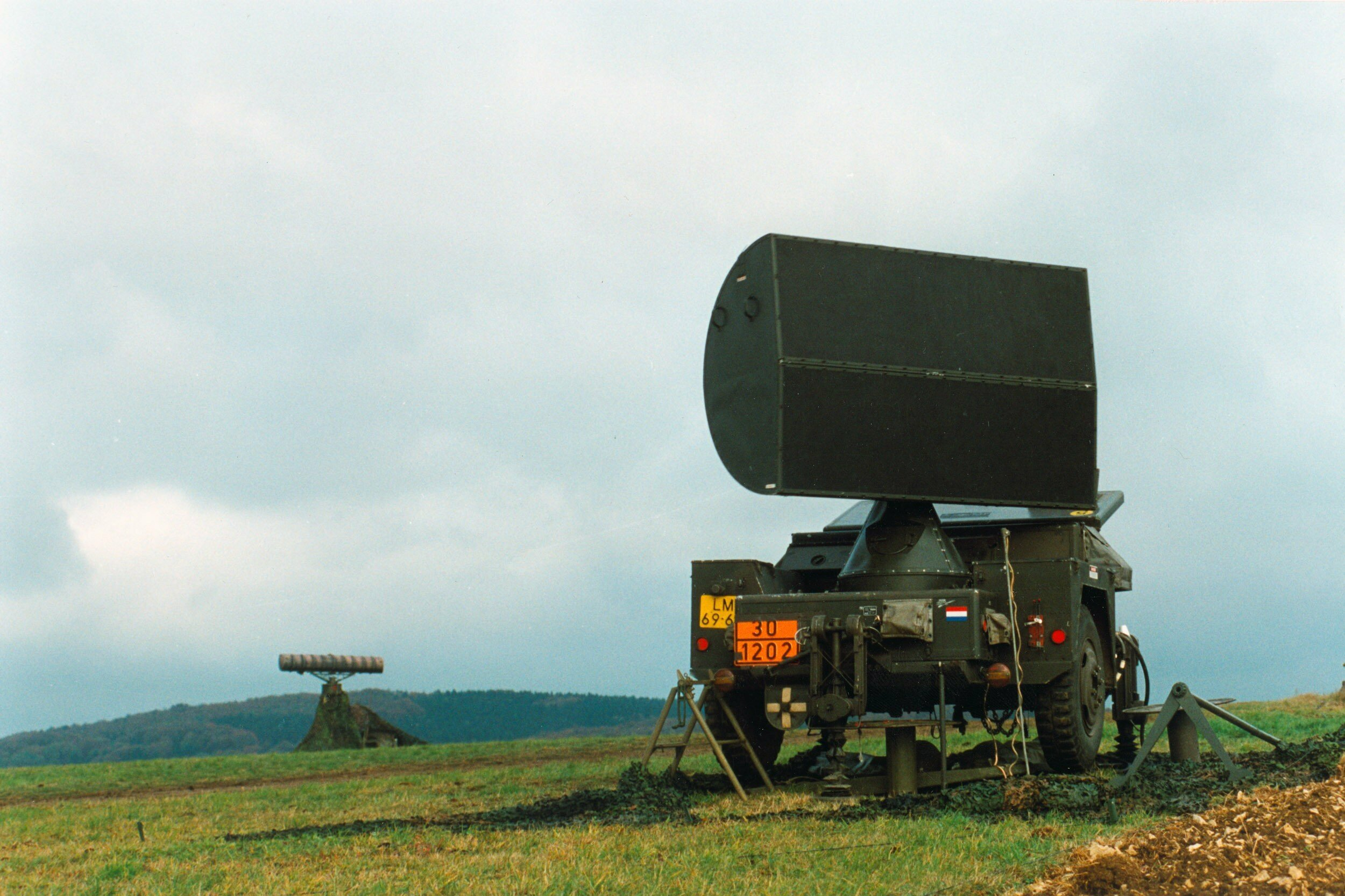
The Improved CW Acquisition Radar

- AN/MPQ-64 Sentinel (Hawk XXI)

A X-Band 3D range-gated doppler radar system used with the Hawk XXI system. It replaces both the CWAR and PAR components of the Hawk system. MPQ-64 Sentinel provides coverage out to a range of 47 mi (75 km), rotating at 30 rpm. The system has a mean time between failure of around 600 hours, and can track at least 60 targets at once. It can elevate up to +55 degrees and depress to −10 degrees.

CWAR Continuous Wave Acquisition Radar

This X Band Continuous wave system is used to detect targets. The unit comes mounted on its own mobile trailer. The unit acquires targets through 360 degrees of azimuth while providing target radial speed and raw range data.

- AN/MPQ-34 (Basic Hawk)

MPQ-34 Hawk CW Acquisition radar with a power rating of 200 W and a frequency of 10 GHz (X-Band) Built by Raytheon. Replaced by MPQ-48.

- AN/MPQ-48 (Improved Hawk)

The Improved Hawk version of the CW acquisition radar doubled the output power and improved the detection ranges:

- Range (source Janes):
  - 43 mi (69 km) (CW) to 39 mi (63 km) (FM) versus 32 ft^{2} (3 m^{2}) target.
  - 40 mi (65 km) (CW) to 37 mi (60 km) (FM) versus 26 ft^{2} (2.4 m^{2}) target.
  - 32 mi (52 km) (CW) to 30 mi (48 km) (FM) versus 11 ft^{2} (1 m^{2}) target.
- AN/MPQ-55 (Phase I – Phase II)

Hawk Improved Continuous Wave Acquisition Radar or ICWAR. The output power is doubled to 400 W, this increases the detection range to around 43 mi (70 km). The radar operates in the 10–20 GHz (J band). Other features include FM ranging and BITE (Built in test equipment). Frequency modulation is applied to the broadcast on alternate scans of the ICWAR to obtain range information.

- AN/MPQ-62 (Phase III)

Some changes to the signal processing allow the radar to determine the targets' range and speed in a single scan. A digital DSP system is added which allows a lot of the processing work to be done on the radar directly and forwarded directly via a serial digital link to the PCP/BCP.

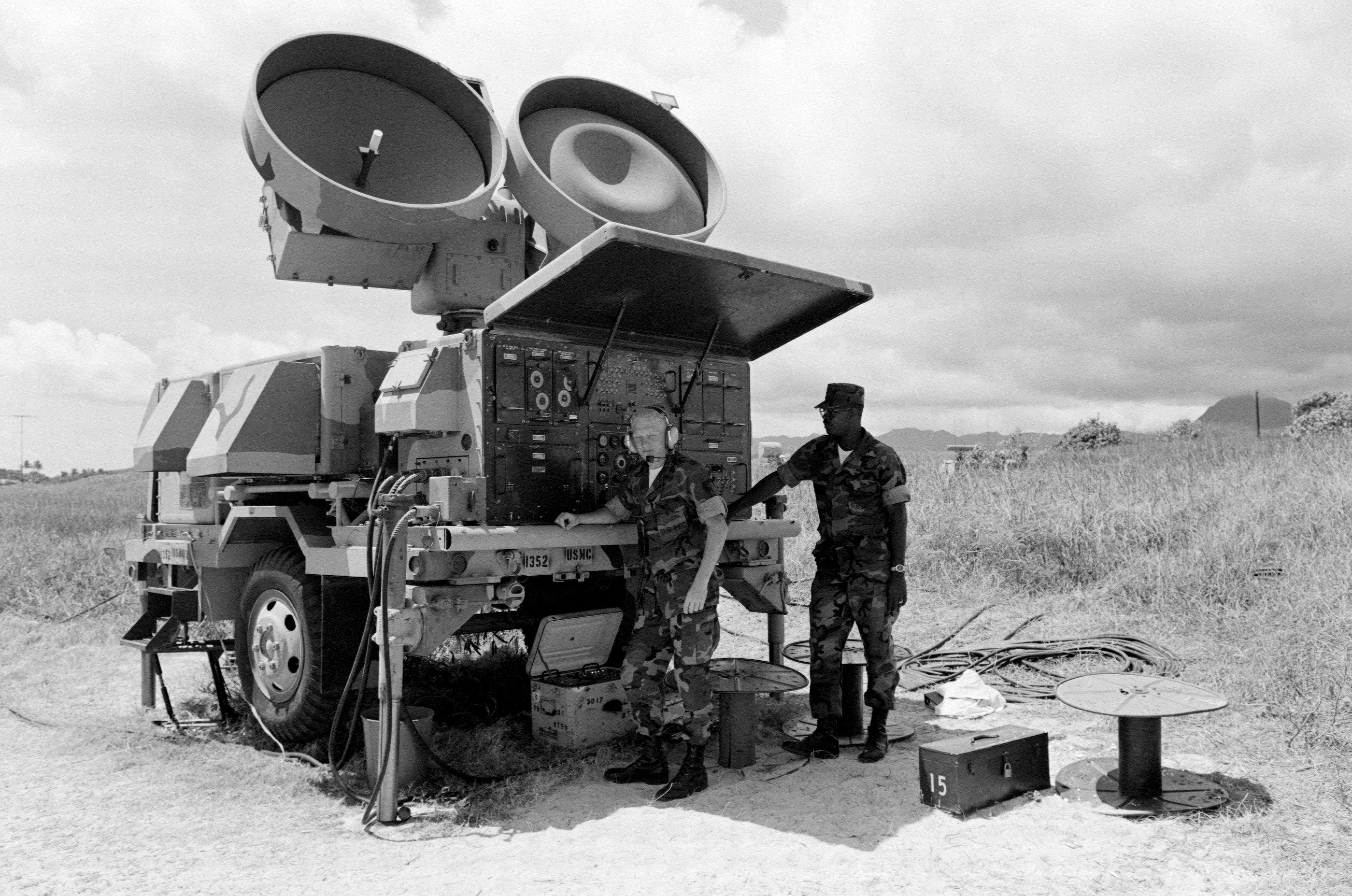
A Hawk HPI radar

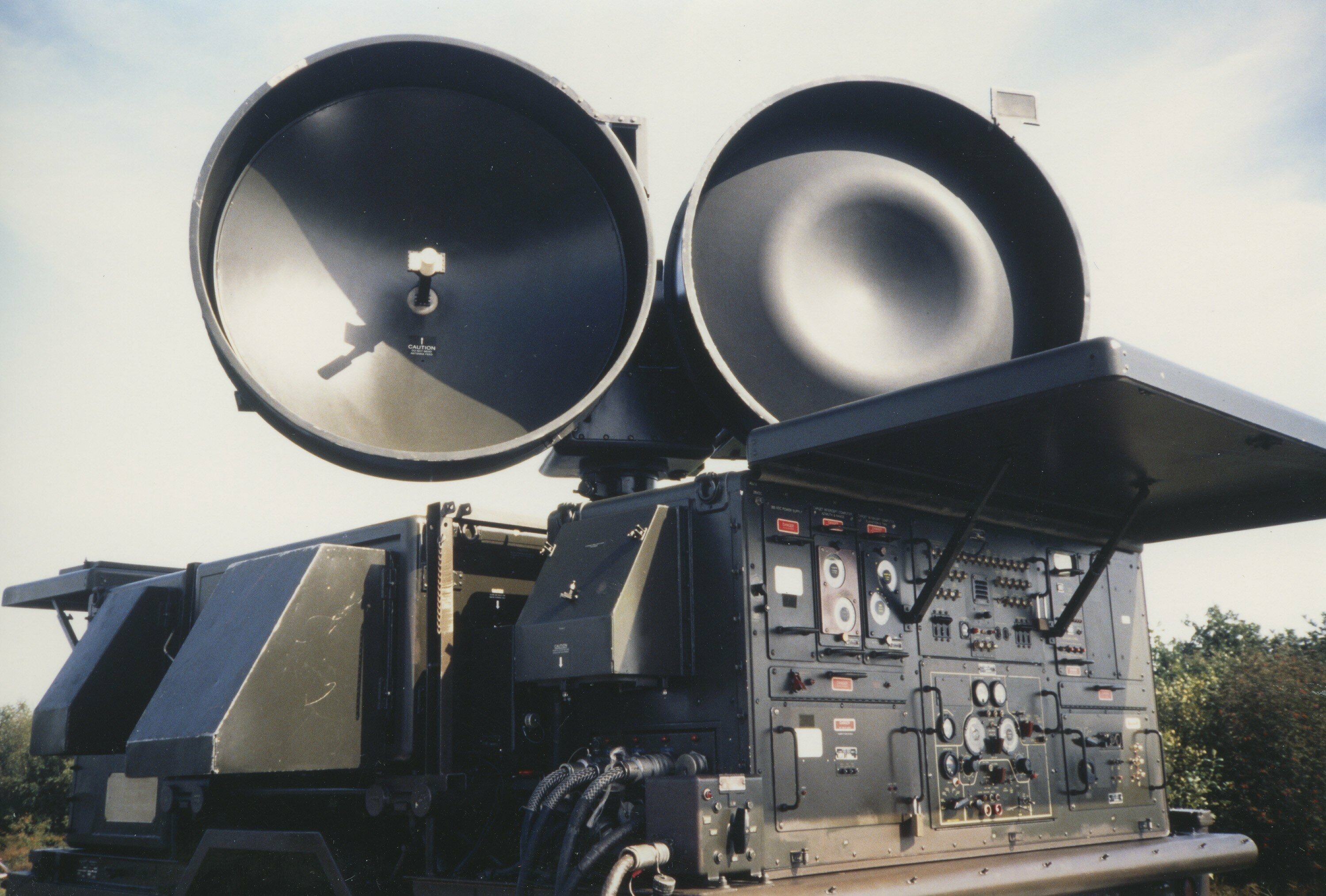
HPIR radar control panel

HPIR High Power Illuminating Radar

The early AN/MPQ-46 High Power Illuminator (HPIR) radars had only the two large dish-type antennas side by side, one to transmit and one to receive. The HPIR automatically acquires and tracks designated targets in azimuth, elevation and range. It also serves as an interface unit supplying azimuth and elevation launch angles computed by the Automatic Data Processor (ADP) in the Information Coordination Centre (ICC) to the IBCC or the Improved Platoon Command Post (IPCP) for up to three launchers. The HPIR J-band energy reflected from the target is also received by the Hawk missile.

These returns are compared with the missile reference signal being transmitted directly to the missile by the HPIR. Target tracking is continued throughout the missile's flight. After the missile intercepts the target, the HPIR Doppler data is used for kill evaluation. The HPIR receives target designations from one or both surveillance radars via the Battery Control Centre (BCC) and automatically searches a given sector for a rapid target lock on. The HPIR incorporates ECCM and BITE.

- AN/MPQ-33/39 (Basic Hawk)

This X Band CW System is used to illuminate targets in the Hawk Missile Battery. The unit comes mounted on its own mobile trailer. Unit automatically acquires and tracks designated targets in azimuth elevation and range rate. The system has an output power of around 125 W operating in the 10–10.25 GHz band. MPQ-39 was an upgraded version of the CWIR, Continuous Wave Illumination Radar, MPQ-33.

- AN/MPQ-46 (Improved Hawk – Phase I)

The radar operates in the 10–20 GHz (J band) region. Many of the electron tube components in earlier radars are replaced with solid-state technology.

- Range (source Janes):
  - 62 mi (99 km) (high PRF) to 58 mi (93 km) (low PRF) versus 32 ft^{2} (3 m^{2}) target.
  - 58 mi (93 km) (high PRF) to 55 mi (89 km) (low PRF) versus 26 ft^{2} (2.4 m^{2}) target.
  - 47 mi (75 km) (high PRF) to 45 mi (72 km) (low PRF) versus 11 ft^{2} (1 m^{2}) target.
- AN/MPQ-57 (Phase II)

The majority of the remaining tube electronics are upgraded to solid state. Also, an electro-optical tracking system, the daytime only OD-179/TVY TAS (Tracking Adjunct System) is added for operation in a high ECM environment. The TAS was developed from the US Air Forces TISEO (Target Identification System Electro-Optical) by Northrop. It consists of a video camera with a ×10 zoom lens. The I-TAS which was field tested in 1992 added an infrared capability for night operation as well as automatic target detection and tracking.

- HEOS Germany, Netherlands and Norway modified their Hawk systems with an alternative IR acquisition and tracking system known as the Hawk Electro-Optical Sensor (HEOS) in place of the TAS. HEOS operates in the 8 to 11 μm band and is used to supplement the HPI to acquire and track targets before missile launch.

- AN/MPQ-61 (Phase III)

Upgraded with the addition of the LASHE (Low-Altitude Simultaneous Hawk Engagement) system, which allows the Hawk to engage multiple low level targets by employing a fan beam antenna to provide a wide-angle, low-altitude illumination pattern to allow multiple engagements against saturation raids. This antenna is rectangular. This allows up to 12 targets to be engaged at once. There is also TV/IR optic system for passive missile guidance.

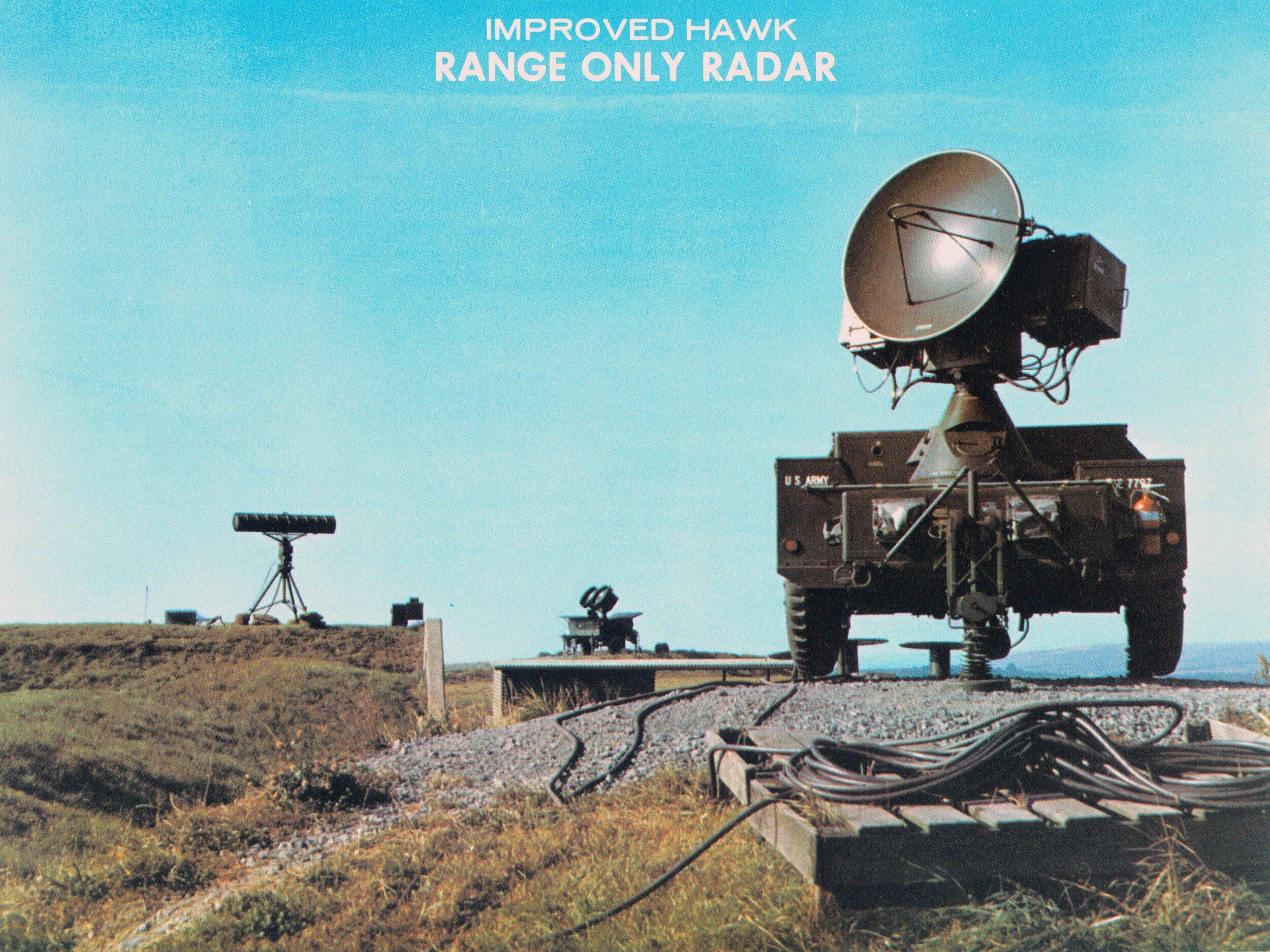
The back-up Range Only Radar of the Improved Hawk system

ROR Range Only Radar

Pulse radar that automatically comes into operation if the HPIR radar cannot determine the range, typically because of jamming. The ROR is difficult to jam because it operates only briefly during the engagement, and only in the presence of jamming.

- AN/MPQ-37 (Basic Hawk)
- AN/MPQ-51 (Improved Hawk – Phase II)

A Ku Band (Freq: 15.5–17.5 GHz) pulse radar, the power output was 120 kW. Pulse length 0.6 μs at a pulse repetition frequency of 1600 Hz. Antenna: 4 ft (1.2 m) dish.

- Range
  - 52 mi (83 km) versus 32 ft^{2} (3 m^{2}) target.
  - 48 mi (78 km) versus 26 ft^{2} (2.4 m^{2}) target.
  - 39 mi (63 km) versus 11 ft^{2} (1 m^{2}) target.

FDC (Hawk Phase III and Hawk XXI) – Fire Distribution Center. C4I unit, enabling modern command, control, communications and Force Operation. Color displays with 3D map overlays enhance the situation awareness. Introduces the real-time exchange of air picture and commands between the Hawk units. Make-ready capability for SL-AMRAAM and SHORAD/vSHORAD systems.

== Country-specific modifications ==
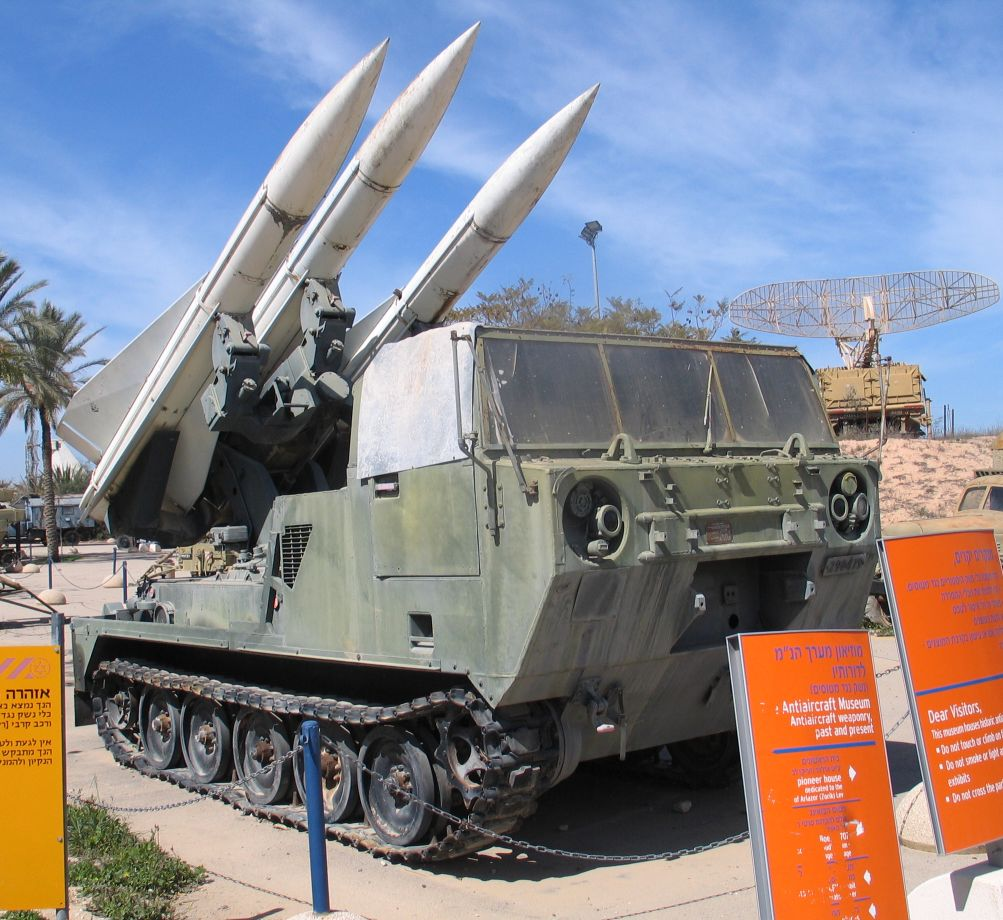
An Israeli M727 mobile Hawk launcher

- Israel

The Israelis have upgraded the Phase 2 standard with the addition of a Super Eye electro-optical TV system for detection of aircraft at 19 to 25 mi (30 to 40 km) and identification at 11 to 16 mi (17 to 25 km). They have also modified their system for engagements at altitudes up to 79,000 ft (24,000 m).

- Sparrow Hawk

A composite system firing AIM-7 Sparrow missiles from a modified 8 round launcher. The system was demonstrated at the China Lake weapons test site in 1985. There are currently no users of the system.

- Hawk AMRAAM

At "Safe Air 95" AMRAAM missiles were demonstrated being fired from a modified M192 missile launcher. The normal battery radar is used for the engagement, with the missile's own radar used for terminal homing. Raytheon and Kongsberg are offering this system as an upgrade to the existing Hawk system. This proposal is aimed particularly at Hawk operating countries that also have AIM-120 AMRAAM in their inventory. Norway is currently operating this type of system as NASAMS.

- Iran

As part of what became known as the Iran–Contra affair, Hawk missiles were some of the weaponry sold to Iran, in violation of an arms embargo, to fund the Contras.

The Islamic Republic of Iran Air Force used a number of MIM-23 Hawk missiles for carriage on F-14 Tomcat fighters in the air-to-air role under a program known as Sedjil, or Sky Hawk. Iran has also modified its ground-based Hawk systems for carriage on a convoy of 8×8 wheeled vehicles and adapted the launchers to carry Standard RIM-66 or AGM-78 missiles with two Standard missiles per launcher.

The Iranian Air Force also used limited numbers of an air-to-surface version of Hawk called Yasser, which consisted of a Hawk missile body with its forward section replaced by the warhead of an M117 bomb. The tail fins were also modified with fairings on their wingtips. It remain unclear what, if any, guidance system was used, but suggestions have included beam riding and Manual command to line of sight.

The Iranian Air Force has its own version of the MIM-23 Hawk. Their copy of the overall system is called Mersad. Iran produces two missiles for use with their Mersad system, Shalamcheh missiles and Shahin missiles. Iran claims both missiles are under production.

In November 2018, Iran unveiled a canister launcher for its Mersad system with the Shahin and Shalamcheh missiles modified into the body of a Sayyad-2. It appeared again in November 2019, but with 3 canisters instead of 2. The systems was named Mersad-16.

- Norway

Norway has developed its own Hawk upgrade scheme known as the Norwegian Adapted Hawk (NOAH) which involves the lease of I-Hawk launchers, HPI radars and missile loaders from the United States and their integration with Kongsberg 'Acquisition Radar and Control System' (ARCS) battle management stations and Hughes (now Raytheon) AN/TPQ-36A airspace surveillance radars. The NOAH system became operational in 1988. It was replaced by NASAMS in the period 1995–98, which retains ARCS but replaces the Hawk missiles with AIM-120 AMRAAM launchers.

- ACWAR

Future developments were expected to include the introduction of an Agile CW Acquisition Radar (ACWAR), an evolution of the Hawk CW radar technology. It would perform full 3-D target acquisition over a 360° azimuth sector and large elevation angles. The ACWAR programme was initiated to meet increasingly severe tactical air defence requirements and the equipment is being designed for operation of Hawk in the late 1990s and beyond. However, the ACWAR programme was terminated in 1993.

== Combat history ==
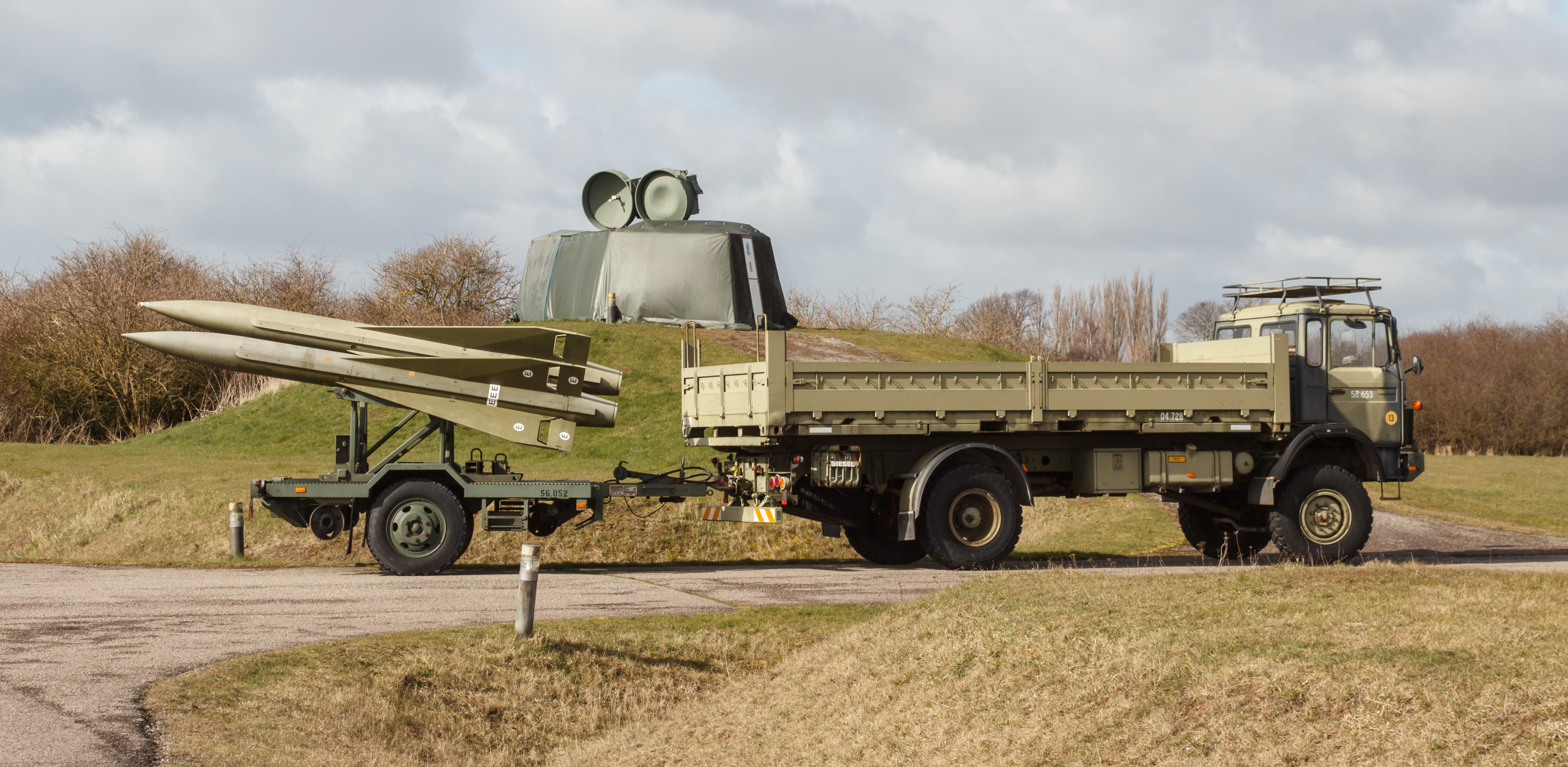
Hawk missile battery trailered by a two-axle military truck

- August 1962: An agreement in principle was reached between the US and Israeli governments for the sale of Hawk missiles to Israel.
- October–November 1962: the Cuban Missile Crisis necessitates a request for a total of 304 missiles to be delivered at an average turnaround of three days per missile.
- February–March 1965: the United States Marine Corps deploys the Hawk at Da Nang and Hill 327. This was both the first USMC deployment of the Hawk, and the first deployment of the Hawk in Vietnam.
- March 1965: the first Hawk battalion was deployed to Israel.
- June 5, 1967: in an unusual incident an Israeli MIM-23A shot down a damaged Israeli Dassault MD.450 Ouragan that was in danger of crashing into the Negev Nuclear Research Center near Dimona, being the first combat firing of the Hawk and the first combat kill attributed to the Hawk system.
- March 21, 1969: a Hawk battery deployed at Baluza, in the Sinai region, detected an Egyptian MiG-21 aircraft which took off from Port Said airport. The aircraft was tracked on the radar and when the MiG-21 broke to a course heading towards the Hawk battery, a missile shot it down.
- War of Attrition: Hawk batteries shot down between 8 and 12 aircraft. Jane's reports 12 kills as one Il-28, four Su-7, four MiG-17 and three MiG-21.
- May 1972: improved Hawk support equipment first deployed to Germany.
- 1977: all US Army units in Europe and Korea completed conversion of Basic to Improved Hawk by the end of the year.
- Iran–Iraq War 1980–1988: at least 40 Iraqi aircraft were destroyed by Iranian Hawk missiles during the Iran–Iraq War. On February 12, 1986, nine Iraqi aircraft downed by a Hawk site near al-Faw in southern Iraq during Operation Dawn 8. Among the aircraft are Su-22s and MiG-23s. Additionally, Iranian Hawk sites shot down three friendly F-14 Tomcats and one F-5 Tiger II. Kuwait also shot down an Iranian F-5.
- March 1985: DA and the Office of the Secretary of Defense (OSD) approved the development of an anti-tactical missile (ATM) mission for Hawk.
- September 7, 1987: the French Army's 403rd Air Defense Regiment in Chad shot down a Libyan Tu-22B on a bombing mission with an MIM-23B during the Chadian–Libyan war. The particularity of this event is with its geographical situation, a few miles from a border. The attack began outside the Chadian territory proper and left the French with only a very small window of opportunity to shoot the intruder. The interception took place almost at the vertical of the battery. Debris and unexploded bombs from the Tu-22 rained over the position but injured no one.
- August 2, 1990: Hawk missiles defending Kuwait against the Iraqi invasion in August 1990 are claimed to have shot down up to 14 Iraqi aircraft. Only two kills have been verified, a MiG-23BN and a Su-22. In response, an Iraqi Su-22 from the No.109 Squadron fired a single Kh-25MP anti-radiation missile against a Failaka Island battery. This forced a radar shutdown on the Hawk. It was later captured by Iraqi special forces. Iraqi forces captured four or five Kuwaiti Hawk batteries.
- November 1990: Task Force Scorpion, a U.S. Army Hawk-Patriot electronic task force, becomes operational and assumes the air defense mission for Desert Shield units forming up in Saudi Arabia.
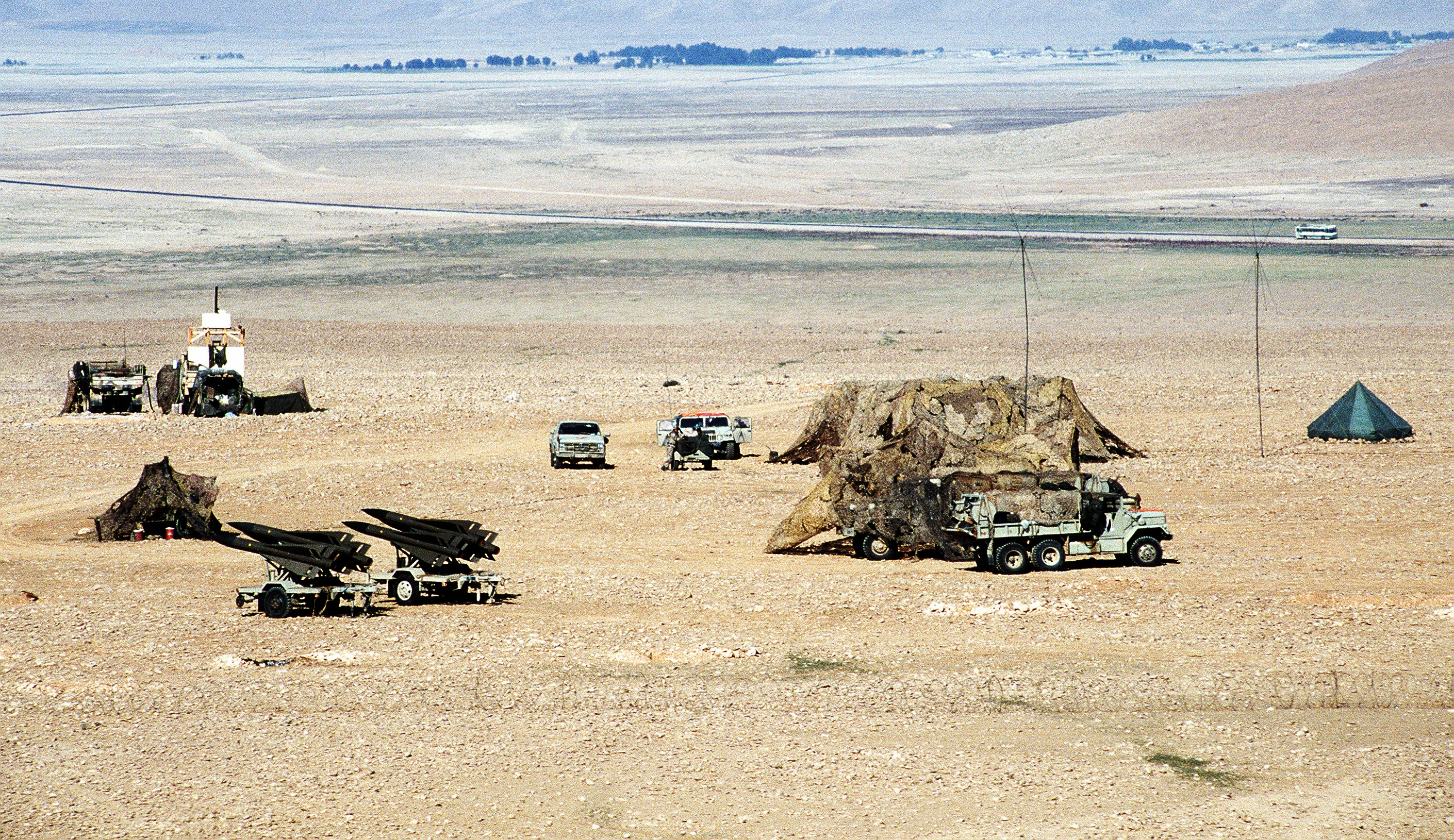
  Hawk battery stands ready outside Al-Salman during Operation Desert Storm.
  February 1991: Bravo Battery, 2-1 ADA moves into Iraq and establishes Hawk missile sites near as-Salman.
- A SAFE AIR demonstration was conducted at WSMR to display the effectiveness and versatility of several existing and new United States Army weapon systems in providing air and surface defense. Emphasis was placed on defeating cruise missiles and unmanned aerial vehicles (UAVs). The Hawk system successfully engaged two surrogate cruise missiles, one UAV, and one fixed wing drone.
- The United States Marine Corps successfully tested its Hawk Mobility and theater missile defense (TMD) software upgrades at White Sands Missile Range. Hawk acquired the three LANCE targets, two of which were successfully engaged and destroyed. This was the first time the entire USMC ATBM system had been tested.
- At the end of March 2020, Turkey deployed at least one HAWK missile battery in the Syrian Idlib province, following a brief armed confrontation with Syria after a Syrian and Russian airstrike that killed 34 and wounded 36 Turkish soldiers in Balyun on 27 February 2020.
- At the end of June 2020, Turkey deployed HAWK missile batteries to defend Mitiga, Tripoli and the newly captured Al-Watiya Air Base in Libya.
- 4 July 2020, unidentified non-Libyan warplanes aligned to the LNA targeted Al-Watiya Air Base. A GNA official in Tripoli acknowledged that the airstrikes destroyed GNA defenses including MIM-23 Hawk and KORAL Electronic Warfare System stationed in the base. The Defense Ministry of Turkey acknowledged that the strikes damaged some of their defense systems. Turkish officials stated no one died in the attack and vowed retribution, indicating the attack could have been perpetrated by Emirati Dassault Mirage aircraft. According to Russian sources the attack left at least 3 MIM-23 Hawk destroyed as well as a radar and an electronic warning system. Another Libyan source indicated one MIM-23 defense battery and 3 radars destroyed, as well as 6 Turkish servicemen killed.
- December 2022, Ukraine started to use the system to defend against the Russian invasion. Ukraine received its first HAWK missile systems from Spain on 3 December, 2022. Spain pledged a total of six launchers to Ukraine, with the United States to provide refurbished missiles. Western analysts put its accuracy at 85% chance of hitting a target.. On 24 July 2025, the US has approved the $172 million sale of Hawk Phase III missile system and related equipment along with $150 million sale of Bradley infantry fighting vehicle in two separate packages

== Operators ==
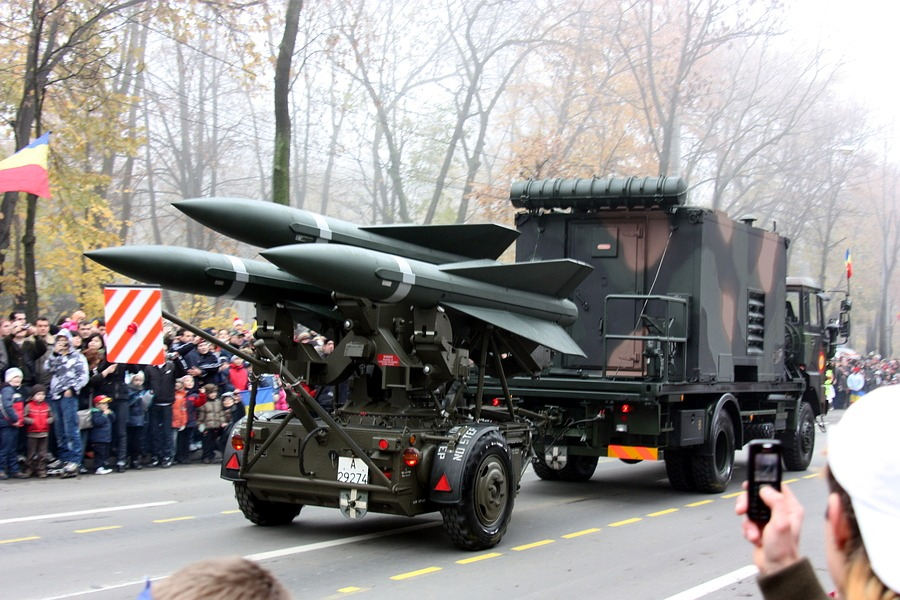
A Hawk SAM being towed by a truck on the Romanian National Day parade, December 2008, at the Triumph Arch in Bucharest

=== Current operators ===
==== Phase I ====
- Bahrain
- Egypt
- Greece
- Iran Produced locally in Iran as the Mersad missile
- Kuwait
- Saudi Arabia
- Singapore
- Spain
- Sweden
- (United Arab Emirates) UAE

==== Phase II ====
These countries have implemented Phase I and Phase II improvements.

- Greece

==== Phase III ====
- Egypt – on 25 Feb 2014, ordered 186 new rocket motors.
- Greece
- Israel – to be replaced by David's Sling.
- Japan – all systems upgraded by 2003.
- Jordan – on 25 Feb 2014, ordered 114 new rocket motors.
- Morocco
- Saudi Arabia
- Singapore
- Spain
- Sweden
- (United Arab Emirates) UAE
- Ukraine – 20 batteries (12 Hawk launchers provided by Spain). U.S. provided Ukraine with an unspecified number of refurbished HAWK missiles from its own inventory. Sweden also donated an undisclosed number of launchers. On 9 April 2024, the US Defense Security Cooperation Agency (DSCA) said that the US State Department has approved a possible Foreign Military Sale (FMS) to Ukraine of MIM-23 HAWK Phase III surface-to-air missile (SAM) system sustainment and related elements of logistics and programme support, The U.S. government is set to effectively buy back recently retired Hawk surface-to-air missile systems from Taiwan, which will then be transferred to the Ukrainian armed forces. On November 5, 2024 former Raytheon official confirmed transfer of Taiwan’s MIM-23 missiles to Ukraine with US approval.

==== Hawk XXI ====
- Morocco – Purchased in 2010.
- (Romania) Romanian Air Force – Former Dutch PIP III systems upgraded in 2018. Also integrated with four EL/M-2106 ATAR radars acquired in 2017.
- Spain – Received the first Hawk XXI in 2021.
- Turkey – Deployed in Syria and Libya as of 2020.

=== Former operators ===
==== Phase I ====
- United States (phased out)
- Norway (phased out in 1998)
- Germany (phased out in 2005)
- France (phased out in 2012)
- Italy (phased out in 2011)
- Republic of Iraq (1992–2003) ((captured Kuwaiti units)
- Pahlavi Iran (before the revolution in 1979)
- Taiwan (replaced by Tien Kung 3)

==== Phase II ====
- Belgium (phased out 2004)
- Denmark (phased out)
- France (phased out in 2005)
- Germany (phased out in 2005)
- Italy (phased out in 2011)
- United States (phased out)

==== Phase III ====
- Netherlands (phased out 2004)
- France (phased out)
- Germany (phased out in 2005)
- United States (phased out)
- (South Korea) Republic of Korea – 8 batteries (phased out, replaced by KM-SAM)
- Taiwan – 16 batteries (phased out, replaced by Tien Kung 3 in 2023)

==== Former Phase ? ====
- West Germany
- Francoist Spain

== See also ==
=== Related Development ===
- Mersad, an Iranian reverse-engineered clone of the MIM-23 HAWK launcher system. The Shahin missile fired from it is a direct clone of the MIM-23 HAWK missile
- Sedjil, an Iranian modified MIM-23 for use as an air-to-air missile from the Grumman F-14 Tomcat
- Fakour-90, an Iranian MIM-23 with the control surfaces of the AIM-54 Phoenix missile
- Yasser, an Iranian air-to-ground rocket with a 750 lb (340 kg) M117 bomb as a warhead and the rear fins and fuselage of the MIM-23

=== Missiles of comparable role, configuration, and era ===
- SA-3 Goa Soviet low-altitude missile system
- SA-6 Gainful advanced Soviet mobile low-altitude missile system

=== Related lists ===
- List of military electronics of the United States
