= Battle of Al-Watiya Airbase =

- Part of Libyan civil war (2014–2020)
Date	8 April 2019 – 19 May 2020
Location	Al-Watiya Air Base, Libya 32.4798°N 11.8972°E
Result	GNA victory

Belligerents
(Libya) House of Representatives; Supported by: Russia; UAE	(Libya) Government of National Accord; Supported by: Turkey

Commanders and leaders
(Libya) Field Marshal Khalifa Haftar (LNA supreme commander)	(Libya) Prime Minister Fayez al-Sarraj (head of Presidential Council)

Strength
Unknown	Unknown

The Battle of Al-Watiya Airbase in 2020 marked a crucial turning point in the Second Libyan Civil War, as Government of National Accord (GNA) forces sought to reclaim control from the Libyan National Army (LNA) led by General Khalifa Haftar.

== Background ==
In April 2019, General Haftar's forceslaunched an offensive to seize the capital, Tripoli, from the UN-backed Government of National Accord. During this offensive, Air Force planes loyal to the GNA attacked LNA positions, escalating tensions between the opposing factions.

== Airstrikes and escalations ==
On April 8, 2019, a series of airstrikes occurred involving both pro-LNA and pro-GNA air forces. Pro-GNA fighter jets targeted the Al-Watiya air force base, prompting a swift response from pro-LNA MiG-21 fighter jets that successfully bombed the pro-GNA Mitiga International Airport in Tripoli. The exchange of airstrikes demonstrated the intensity of the conflict.

A Dassault Mirage F1 incident on April 24, 2019, near Al-Watiya Air Base added further complexity. Initially claimed by pro-LNA sources as a pro-GNA Mirage F-1AD shot down, later analysis suggested it was a Mirage F1-AD with an unclear ownership history. However, analysis by foreign experts revealed it to be actually a Mirage F1-AD serial number 402, and initially suggested it was previously in the possession of the pro-LNA air forces, and that it was shot down by its own pro-LNA anti-air defences.

== Siege and counter-attacks ==
On 19 June 2019, pro-GNA forces claimed that their fighter jets bombed pro-LNA Al Watiya air force base, destroying on the runway a Russian Su-22 fighter bomber just as it was taking off. The conflict continued in April 2020 when GNA forces besieged Al-Watiya Air Base, prompting a counter-attack by LNA forces that captured the town of Al-Aqrabiya.

== GNA offensive and capture ==
On May 5, 2020, the GNA launched a new offensive to capture Al-Watiya airbase, claiming to have successfully encircled the base. GNA forces claimed to have destroyed two enemy Grad Rocket launch vehicles and various ammunition vehicles. The sustained assault culminated in the capture of the airbase on May 18, 2020, marking a significant advancement for forces aligned with Libya's internationally recognized government. GNA forces seized the remains of 2 Mirage F1 and 1 Su-22.

== Aftermath and developments ==
Following the capture, the GNA forces secured a Pantsir-S1 TLAR at the base, transporting it for examination. On July 4, 2020, unidentified "foreign" warplanes targeted Al-Watiya Air Base, with conflicting reports on the extent of damage. The base's subsequent expansion, improvements to the runway, and ongoing air operations underscored its continued strategic importance.
