= Noor (artillery rocket) =

Iranian artillery rocket

Noor/Arash 3
- Illustration of the Arash 3 (Noor) rocket
- Type: Rocket artillery
- Place of origin: Iran

Specifications
- Length: 2.05 m
- Diameter: 122 mm
- Payload capacity: 18 kg
- Operational range: 18 km
- Maximum speed: 720 m/s
- Steering system: fin-stabilized
- Launch platform: Hadid HM 20

The Noor or Arash 3 is an Iranian 122 mm fin-stabilized artillery rocket. It is speculated to be an Iranian variant of a Chinese or Russian 122 mm artillery rocket.

== Characteristics ==
The Noor rocket is designed to be a part of Iranian light artillery. The rocket is fin-stabilized and has a body of steel and a high explosive warhead. The rocket had a red and silver nose, a green warhead with Iranian flag on side, silver body and gold fins. The rocket has a diameter of 122 mm, a length of 2.05 m, a speed of 720 m/s, a range of 18 km and a payload capacity of 18 kg. It is carried and launched by an Hadid HM 20 rocket launcher system which is a 40-round launcher system mounted on the back of a Mercedes-Benz LAK 2624 6 × 6 truck chassis.

== See also ==
- Shahin
- Arash
- Oghab
