= Sedjil (air-to-air missile) =

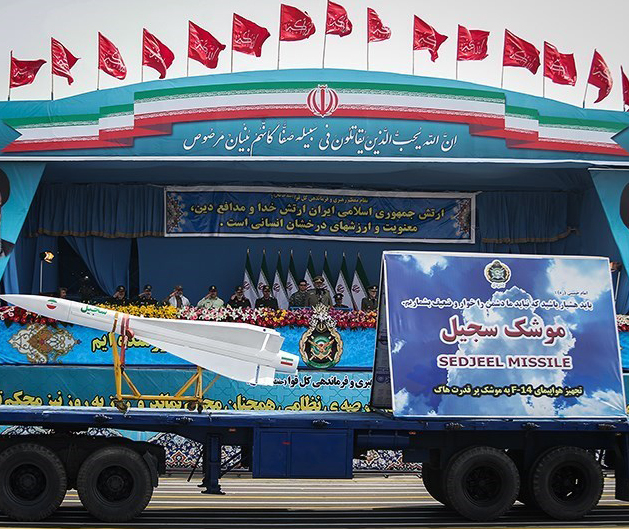
- Type: Air-to-air missile

Service history
- In service: 1984 April 4
- Used by: Iran

Production history
- Manufacturer: Self-Sufficiency Jihad Organization Islamic Republic of Iran Air Force

Specifications
- Mass: 500 kg
- Length: 5 m
- Diameter: 40 cm
- Propellant: Solid fuel
- Operational range: AIM-23A(150 KM)/AIM-23B(180 KM)/AIM-23C(200 KM)
- Maximum speed: mach AIM-23A(4/5 Mach)/AIM-23B(5 Mach)/ AIM-23C(5/5 Mach)
- Guidance system: guided AIM-23A semi-active radar/ AIM-23B/C active radar

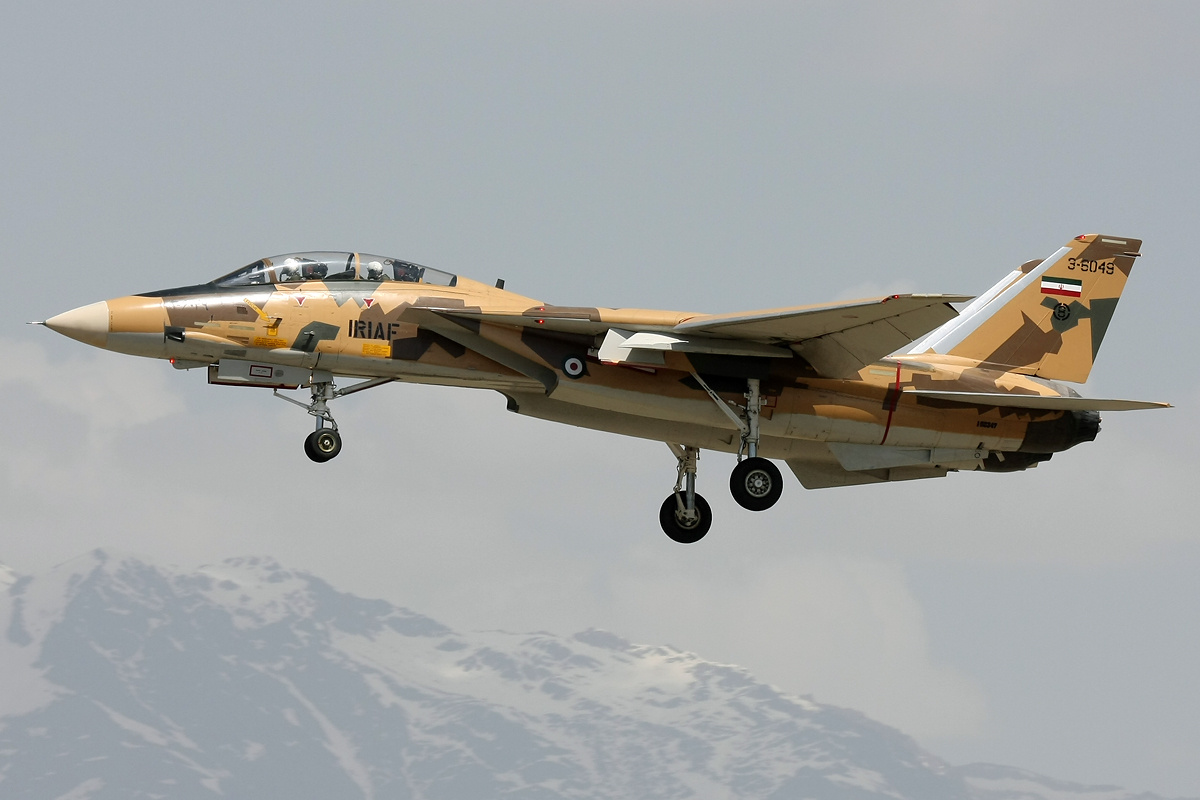
F-14 Tomcat, which can carry a Sedjil-missile

Sedjil (Persian: سجیل) is an Iranian semi-active radar homing air-to-air missile. It is made by the Self-Sufficiency Jihad Organization of the Islamic Republic of Iran Air Force and is actually a modified version of the surface-to-air MIM-23 HAWK. The Sedjil weighs approximately 500 kg, its length is 5 meters and its diameter is about 40 cm. The effective range of the missile is approximately 150/180/200 km. Its speed is estimated to be about mach 4/5-5/5.

After six years of combat in the Iran–Iraq War, the prolonged conflict led to a shortage of weapons for Iranian forces, and they felt the need to procure additional weapons systems. The Islamic Republic of Iran Air Force, employed an experienced test pilot, Fereidoun Ali-Mazandarani, as the experimental pilot in November 1986, and succeeded in synchronizing the mentioned missile with the AN/AWG-9 radar of the F-14 Tomcat launch aircraft. Experts in the Islamic Republic of Iran Air Force also presented a related plan to convert the HAWK missiles. This plan was presented for the first time on 12 August 1986 with the name of "Project-Sedjil" by Ata'Allah-Bazargan (a high-ranking military pilot) and Fereidun Ali Mazandarani. It was submitted to the Iranian Air Force. The missile was finally manufactured on 4 April 1988.

== Operational history ==
In its first military use Cpt. Mazandarani managed to shoot down one Super Etendard over Persian Gulf from 20 km away.

According to Iranian military documents and the book "Battle in the Sky" written by Brigadier General Fazllolah Javidnia, a MiG-29A was shot down by an F-14A using this missile in 1988.

== See also ==
- List of military equipment manufactured in Iran
- Islamic Republic of Iran Air Force
- Armed Forces of the Islamic Republic of Iran
- Sejjil
- Iran–Iraq War
