= Mersad =

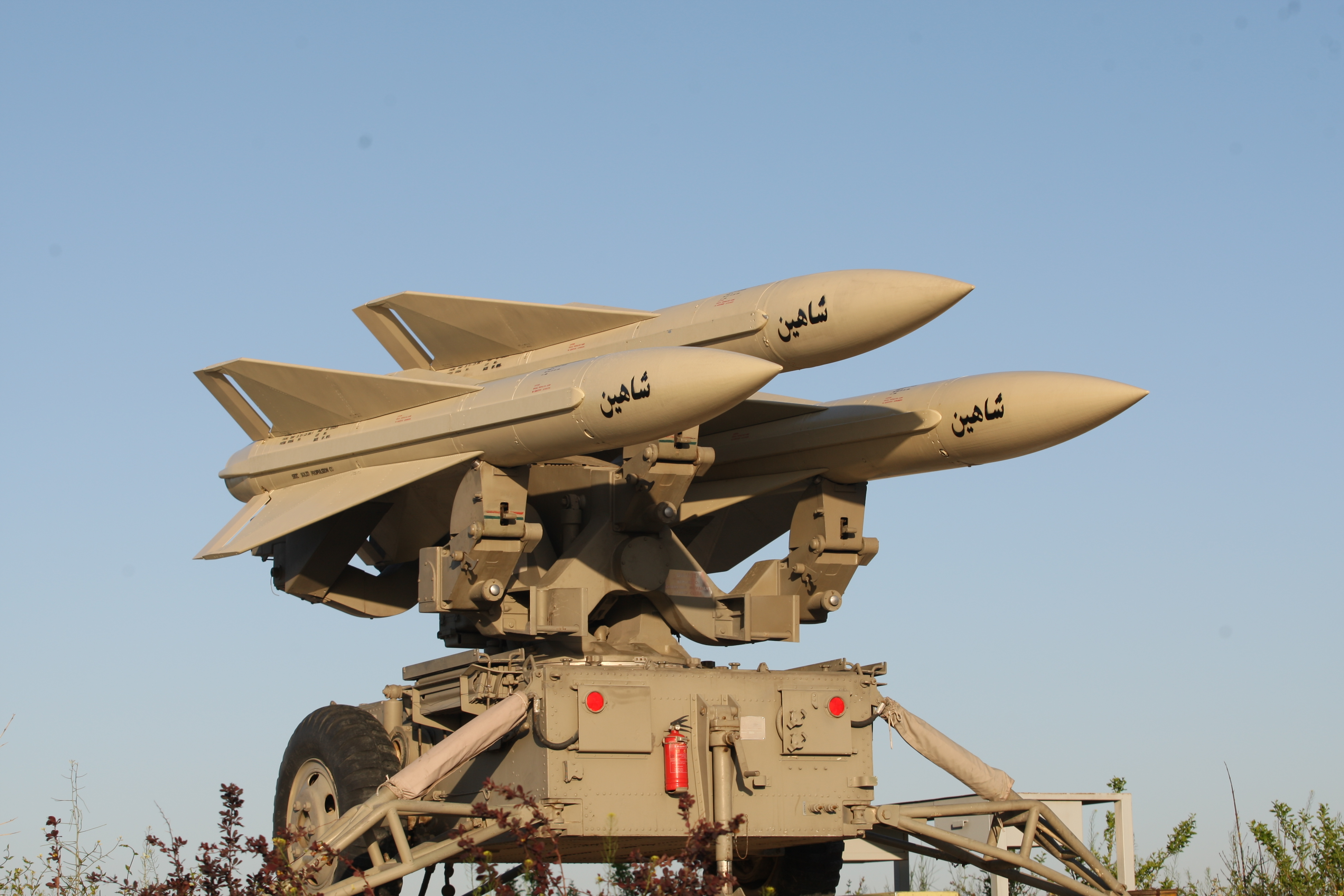
- Mersad equipped with Shahin missiles
- Type: Air defense system
- Place of origin: Iran

Service history
- In service: 2010–present
- Used by: Iran; Syria

Production history
- Produced: Since 2010
- Variants: Mersad, Mersad Phase I, Mersad Phase II (Under Development)

Specifications
- Mass: Shalamche: 636 kg
- length: Shalamche: 5,030 mm
- Diameter: Shalamche: 356 mm
- Main armament: 3× Shahin or Shlamche missiles
- Engine: Solid propellant rocket engine
- Operational range: Shahin: 45 km (30 miles) Shalamche: 40 km Phase II: ~60 km (Planned)
- Maximum speed: More than Mach 2.4, Shalamche: Mach 3
- Guidance system: Semi-active radar homing

Mersad (Persian: مرصاد, meaning 'Ambush') is an Iranian low- to mid-range air defense system developed in 2010. It fires Shahin (Falcon) missiles which are reverse-engineered, domestically upgraded versions of the American MIM-23 Hawk surface-to-air missiles. It uses a series of domestically produced radars and electronic devices.

== Development ==
In 2010, Iran announced that it had launched the production line of a new air defense system named Mersad, which incorporates Shahin missiles. It was said that the system consisted of different target tracing and tracking radars, soft and hardware networks, launch pads for Shahin missiles and a command and control center. Iranian defense minister Ahmad Vahidi said the Mersad air defense system had superior capabilities and included more capabilities than its western rivals like the Hawk mid-range defense system. Vahidi reiterated that Mersad was resistant to electronic warfare and could be used as part of a network of radar and air defense systems and was fully digital. The Shahin missile is an improved reverse-engineered version of US-made MIM-23 Hawk surface-to-air missile sold to Iran before the 1979 revolution.

Some months later, Iran announced that it had increased the range and altitude of the missile defense system. Vahidi also noted that the new system can also engage more targets at the same time.

In November 2010, Iranian air force colonel Faramarz Ruh Afza said that Mersad had a limited ability to intercept ballistic missiles. That same day, the commander of Khatam al anbia base, Ahmad Miqani, said that Iran is working on the improving the Mersad with the second phase including double range and altitude.

=== Tests ===
Iran tested the Mersad two days after Miqani's speech in an Air Defense Wargame called Defenders of the Skies of Velayat III. In this test, Iran shot down a UAV using its Mersad Air Defense System.

Also on April 18, 2011, Iran tested two other Mersad missiles from a site in Semnan. Later it was announced that the missiles were not Shahin but a further upgraded one called Shalamche. Iranian Defense minister Ahmad Vahidi stated that the speed is now about Mach 3 with an increase of about Mach 0.6 . He called the missile state of art because of its new electronics which made it highly resistance to Electronic warfare. He said that the range of this missile is about 40 km and it is going to be increased.

On May 16, Iran tested the new missile again in an air defense war game in eastern Iran.

According to Iranian officials, the most important factors of new Mersad Phase I system are increase in range and a new advanced algorithm for guiding the missile into its target.

On September 4, Iran announced that Shalamche missile is now being delivered to Iranian Air Defense Force.

On November 14, 2012, The Shalamcheh missile was fired from the Mersad air defense system at a Karrar (UCAV), which was destroyed, during the Defenders of the Skies of Velayat 4 drill.

In February 2017, a modified version of Mersad system was test fired during the Defenders of the Skies of Velayat in Semnan province alongside two other air defense systems. Based on reports new Mersad system can hit its targets in 35 miles away.

This missile defense system was also tested at "Air Defense (Military) Exercise of Velayat-97" (with new missiles) in November 2018; Mersad's newest version was also tested at "military exercise of Velayat-98" in December 2019.

== Radars ==
Mersad uses four radars. The PAR radar, called Kavosh, is an upgraded copy of the original AN/MPQ-50. The maximum range is increased to 150 km and an IFF system is added to the radar. A new CWAR called Jouiya is used to detect low altitude targets. The HPIR radar, called Hadi, is an upgraded version of AN/MPQ-46 with an additional EO system attached to it. There is also a new supplemental HPIR radar. All of the radars use solid state electronics to have more resistance to electronic warfare and can be linked to the other Mersad systems.

The Hadi radar has equipped with an Electro-optical system in order to detecting and tracking of targets when the battlefield is affected by heavy jamming.

The Mersad system detection range is 150 km and it can lock on targets at a distance of 80 km. It can also detect targets with RCS of about 0.5 square meters at a range of 110 km. In addition, Mersad can engage at least with two targets simultaneously.

Iran has also developed a new phased array radar named Hafez for the Mersad system. Hafez is a 3D radar with 250 km range and ability of tracking 100 targets simultaneously.

== Variants ==
- Mersad: Basic variant. Uses the first generation of Shahin missiles.
- Mersad Phase I: Second variant. Tested in October 2010, this variant has a higher range and altitude. It is also capable of engaging more targets simultaneously.
- Mersad Phase II: Third variant. has double the range and altitude as compared to the basic Mersad.

== Operators ==
- Iran
- Syria: In service with the Syrian Air Defense Force.

== Comparable SAMs ==
- MIM-23 Hawk

== See also ==
- Bavar-373
- Raad Air Defense System
- Sayyad-2
- Ya Zahra air defense system
