= Al-Watiya Air Base =

Military air base in western Libya

- IATA: none; ICAO: none; LID: HL77

Summary
- Airport type: Military
- Owner: Government of National Unity
- Operator: Government of National Unity
- Elevation AMSL: 253 ft (77 m)
- Coordinates: 32°28′20″N 11°54′00″E

Map
- Location of the airport in Libya

Runways
Direction	Length		Surface
Direction	m	ft	Surface
10R/28L	3,200	10,499	Asphalt
10L/28R	3,200	10,499	Asphalt
- Source: GCM Google Maps

Al-Watiya Air Base also known as Okba Ibn Nafa Air Base (ICAO: HL77) is a military airport in the Nuqat al Khams district of western Libya. It was named after Uqba ibn Nafi, the Islamic general who conquered North Africa in the 7th century. It is 27 kilometres (17 mi) east of the Tunisian border and 125 kilometres (78 mi) from Tripoli.

== 2011 military intervention in Libya ==
The al-Watiya air force base was one of the few that escaped total destruction during the NATO-led intervention in 2011 because in its 43 hardened aircraft shelters were stored almost exclusively decommissioned aircraft, so they were not deemed a threat to coalition forces. Just several munition depots located near the airbase and three hardened aircraft shelters were destroyed—where the last operational pro-Gaddafi Mirage F-1BD trainer fighter jet, and the last two operational pro-Gaddafi Su-22M3 bombers were stationed.

== Libyan Civil War (2014–2020) ==
The biggest setback for the pro-GNA forces happened on 9 August 2014, when pro-LNA forces captured al-Watiya air force base, where 10 to 12 decommissioned Su-22 bombers, several Mi-25 combat attack helicopters and possibly up to 21 decommissioned Mirage F-1ED fighter jets, as well as all spare parts and weapons for Mirage F-1ED and Su-22 aircraft, were stored there—this defeat crippled the pro-GNA air forces, because now they lost their main source of spare parts for maintaining their Mirage F-1ED fighter jets.

It then became an important strategic foothold for forces loyal to eastern-based commander Khalifa Haftar. Using the captured equipment in al-Watiya air force base, pro-LNA forces started to bring back to active service several Su-22 bombers and Mirage F-1ED fighter jets in 2014 and 2015.

=== Battle of al-Watiya Airbase ===
In April 2019, Haftar's army launched an offensive to take Tripoli from the UN-backed Government of National Accord, during which Air Force planes loyal to the GNA attacked LNA positions. On 8 April 2019, a series of airstrikes was carried out by both pro-LNA and pro-GNA air forces—pro-GNA fighter jets bombed on that day the pro-LNA al-Watiya air force base, and in response to that attack pro-LNA MiG-21 fighter jets launched from that same air force base successfully bombed the pro-GNA Mitiga International Airport in Tripoli, damaging it.

On 24 April 2019, a Mirage F1 was lost near al-Watiya airbase, shot down by pro-LNA forces, while pro-GNA air forces were bombing the pro-LNA al-Watiya airbase—its pilot, reportedly an Ecuadorian mercenary, ejected safely and was captured by pro-LNA forces, according to pro-LNA sources. At first, pro-LNA sources claimed it was a pro-GNA Mirage F-1AD shot down after bombing the pro-LNA forces in that area. However, analysis by foreign experts revealed it to be actually a Mirage F1-AD serial number 402, and initially suggested it was previously in the possession of the pro-LNA air forces, and that it was shot down by its own pro-LNA anti-air defences. Serial number 402 was later shown to be operational; however, the LNA claim regarding the pilot of the plane and ejection seat remained unproven, and the plane was an F1AD, with the only Mirage F1 previously confirmed to be active in GNA service being an F1ED. Therefore, the original owner of the plane remains unclear. It was unknown whether that Mirage F-1AD that crashed at al-Watiya air force base on April 24 was shot down by pro-LNA forces, or whether it crashed due to technical problems while repelling the pro-GNA air force attack, but a consensus later emerged that (in the absence of an official refutation of the LNA's claim) the Mirage lost must have been a GNA plane.

On 19 June 2019, pro-GNA forces claimed that their fighter jets bombed pro-LNA Al Watiya air force base, destroying on the runway a pro-LNA Su-22 fighter bomber just as it was taking off, however this claims remain unconfirmed by independent sources.

On 16 April 2020, GNA forces besieged al-Watiya airbase. On 21 April, the LNA launched a counter-attack from al-Watiya air base, capturing the town of Al-Aqrabiya north of the air base.

On 5 May 2020, the GNA launched a new offensive to capture al-Watiya airbase. The GNA claimed to have successfully encircled the base and claimed two enemy Grad Rocket launch vehicles destroyed and various ammunition vehicles.

On 18 May 2020, it was captured by forces aligned with Libya's internationally recognised government after a sustained assault, in what could be their most significant advance for nearly a year. At the base, they captured a Pantsir-S1 TLAR belonging to the Libyan National Army with minor damages and was transported by the US forces to be examined.

On 4 July 2020, unidentified "foreign" warplanes targeted al-Watiya airbase, according to a spokesman for the GNA forces, Col. Mohamed Gnounou. The airstrikes destroyed the MIM-23 Hawk missiles and allegedly s KORAL Electronic Warfare System.

== See also ==
- Transport in Libya
- List of airports in Libya
