= Shalamcheh (missile) =

Iranian surface-to-air missile

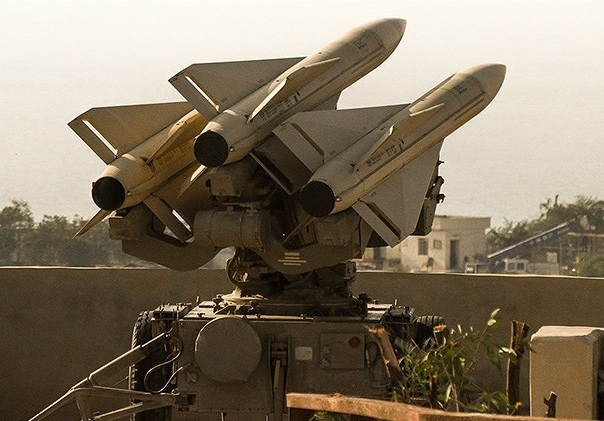
- Shalamcheh missiles launch from Mersad missile system
- Type: Surface-to-air missile
- Place of origin: Iran

Service history
- Used by: Islamic Republic of Iran Air Defense Force

Production history
- Designed: 4 September 2011
- Manufacturer: Ministry of Defence and Armed Forces Logistics (Iran)

Specifications
- Warhead: blast fragmentation warhead
- Engine: solid fuel rocket
- Operational range: 40 km
- Maximum speed: Mach 3

Shalamcheh (Persian: شلمچه) is an Iranian surface-to-air missile claimed to be capable of destroying several sorts of modern fighter jets and drones. This missile is launched from the Mersad domestic air defense system.

Shalamcheh is considered a medium-range missile which can also be utilized as a short-range missile. It travels at the speed of Mach 3, is resistant to enemy electronic warfare, and its average range is 40 kilometres.

== Military tests ==
On 5 May 2014, the army of Iran successfully test-fired Shalamcheh missile, where it shot down the Iranian domestic drone Karrar.

In November 2018, air defense drills were held in the central, northern and western parts of Iran.
