= Shahin (rocket) =

Iranian unguided artillery rocket

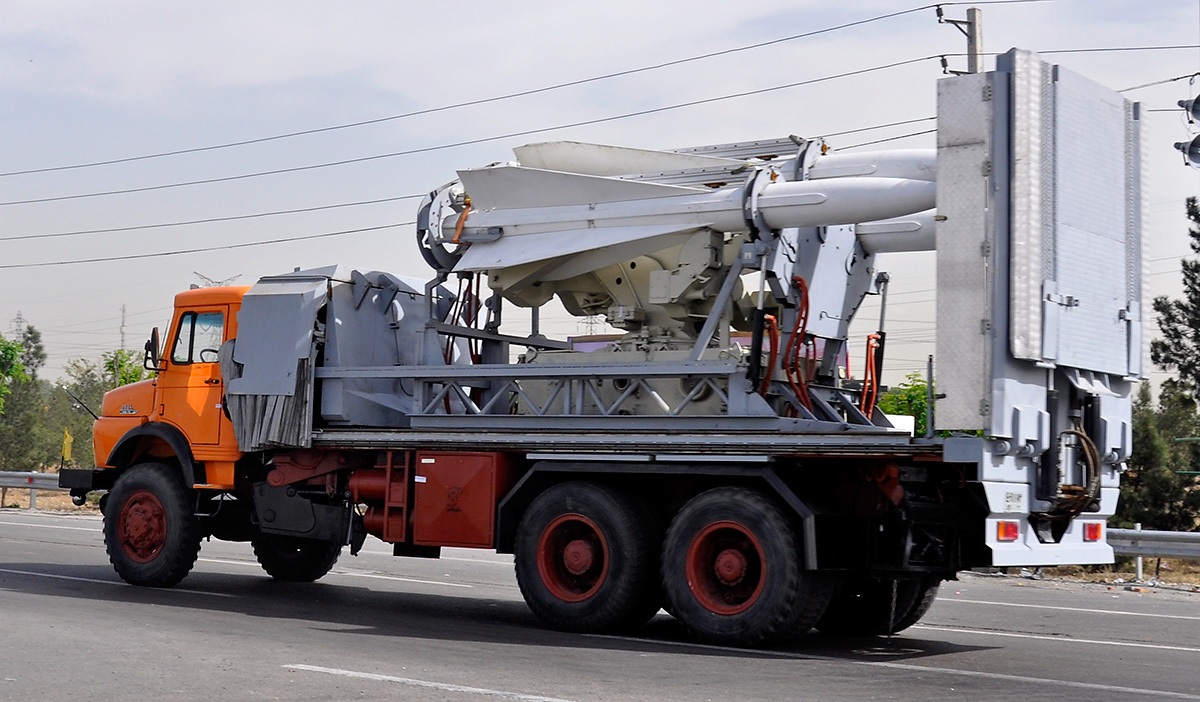
- Type: Rocket artillery
- Place of origin: Iran

Specifications
- Mass: Shahin-1:384 kg Shahin-2:530 kg
- Length: Shahin-1:2.9 m Shahin-2:3.9 m
- Diameter: 333 mm
- Payload capacity: 190 kg HE-frag
- Propellant: solid propelled
- Operational range: Shahin-1:13 km Shahin-2:20 km
- Maximum speed: Shahin-1:450 m/s max Shahin-2:660 m/s max
- Guidance system: Unguided, ballistic flight
- Launch platform: unarmored rail launcher

The Shahin (Persian: شاهین) missile is an Iranian supersonic mid-range, low to mid-altitude surface-to-air missile (SAM). It is an Iranian improved version of the American MIM-23 Hawk and is thus designed for use with the Mersad air defense system. The Shahin-1 and Shahin-2 are Iranian road-mobile truck mounted short-range fin-stabilized unguided 333 mm Artillery rockets. It was designed to be a cost-effective unguided rocket to destroy enemy troop concentrations, installations and fortifications at medium ranges. The rocket has been replaced in production by more capable artillery rockets however it is still in active uses.

== Unveiling and testing ==
The Shahin missiles were developed as part of a domestic weapons program that Iran started in 1992 in response to increasing American sanctions against Iran. The Shahin missiles were first unveiled in April 2010. They were then tested on November 16, 2010 along with the Mersad air defense system during the war games Defenders of the Sky of the Velayat III, the maneuvers were themselves carried out to prepare for a hypothetical Israeli assault on Iranian nuclear facilities. The missile was tested again on 13 June 2011, shortly before entering service.

== Characteristics ==
The missile is considered low to mid-altitude and mid-range low with a range of 70-150 km. The missile is also suggested to be supersonic by various sources. Iranian sources suggest that the missile is somewhat indigenous with upgraded guidance, launcher, advanced radar signal processing technology and advanced guidance systems. Iranians also suggest that it has some Anti-ballistic missile capability. The shahin missile possesses a thin yet cylindrical body with four long chord clipped delta wings, an opening at the end also exists which runs from the boat tail to the middle.

In general both rockets are steel body unguided 333 mm 190 kg explosive fin stabilized rockets having seven nozzles with limited accuracy and assembling times of several minutes. They both are launched from unarmoured triple rail launchers.

=== Shahin-1 ===
It is an unguided 2.9 m long 384 kg 190 kg high explosive 333 mm rocket with a range of 13 km. The rocket had forest green colour with two green, one red and one white stripe, its nose is itself painted white and red.

=== Shahin-2 ===
It is an unguided 3.9 m long 530 kg 190 kg high explosive 333 mm rocket with a range of 20 km. It had a white painted body with two sets of green, white, and red stripes; on its warhead, it had red fins. It can also be used as an air-to-surface missile.

== Operators ==
- Iran
- Sudan

=== Non-state actors ===
- Hezbollah − Shahin-1

== See also ==
=== Other Iranian rockets ===
- Oghab
- Naze'at
- Zelzal-1
- Zelzal-2
- Zelzal-3
- Fajr-5
- Arash
- Tondar-69

=== Comparable systems ===
- Jobaria Defense Systems Multiple Cradle Launcher
- T-122 Sakarya
