= Arash (rocket) =

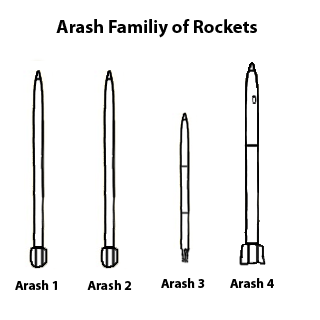
- A drawing of Arash rockets
- Type: Rocket artillery
- Place of origin: Iran

Production history
- Manufacturer: Defense Industries Organization

Specifications
- Caliber: 122 mm
- Effective firing range: 18–40 km. depending on model

The Arash (Persian: آرش, From Iranian Arash) is a series of 122 mm (4.8 in) unguided artillery rocket developed by Iran. It is a copy of BM-21 Grad. A guided version for the Iranian Defense Ministry was recently (July 2020) tested.

== Overview ==
There are four models for export. Each having different specifications:
Arash 1: Range : 21.5 km, Length : 2.815m, Velocity : 710 m/s
Arash 2: Range : 30 km, Length : 2.815m, Velocity : 1050 m/s
Arash 3: Range : 18 km, Length : 2.050m, Velocity : 720 m/s. Also known as Noor.
Arash 4: Range : 40 km, Length : 2.890m, Warhead Types : HE fragmentation, ball steel, mine and fuel air.
The export pages say that Arash 4 has a different launching system than other variants.
All of them are fired from 40-tube launchers.

== Operators ==
- Iran
- Islamic Resistance in Iraq
- Hezbollah
- Ukraine
- Polisario
