= Shipborne Containerized Air Defense System =

Portable systems designed for the protection of ships from air threats.

Shipborne Containerized Air Defense System (SCADS) is a class of air defense systems. Typically composed of small, mobile modules of radar, command, and fire elements disguised within international standard intermodal containers, they are intended to be placed upon merchant ships being urgently pressed into military service at the outbreak of a conflict.

== Examples ==
After the conclusion of Falklands War in 1982, the British government investigated a SCAD system for their ships. The dramatic loss of the unarmed SS Atlantic Conveyer to Argentine Exocets demonstrated the need for self defense systems upon the ships of the STUFTS (Ships Taken Up From Trade) program. The British SCADS system was split between two concepts; SCADS A, which was to use a set of containers to convert the merchant ships to small anti submarine aircraft carriers (Similar to the join Anglo-American Arapaho Containerized Aircraft Handling System), and SCADS B, which would integrate vertical launch anti air and anti submarine systems, such as Seawolf and Ikara, along with ECM, chaff, and flares..

In the early 2000s, the United States Navy investigated the Affordable Weapon System, a containerized cruise missile similar to a miniaturized Tomahawk to be launched from standardized containers, however the project seems to have been cancelled during the budget cuts and cancellations of 2007-2008 as any information on the project past that point is scarce.

In early 2019, MBDA revealed SPIMM (Self-Protection Integrated Mistral Module), a small containerized system using their Mistral heat seeking MANPAD, which was derived from the existing SIMBAD-RC naval mounting for the missile. SPIMM is intended to be used aboard auxiliary ships. SPIMM will carry two missiles read for immediate fire, along with four more in a storage container which can be used to rearm the module. The system will be able to track and fire upon targets in any direction using 360 degree panoramic infrared cameras. Designed to fit within a 10 foot intermodal container, SPIMM only needs a place to be mounted and an electrical connection to the host ship to operate. The Mistral missile's 4 mile range limits its capabilities, however the system adds a useful layer of defense to otherwise large, undefended targets. It has the ability to be used against aerial or surface targets. MBDA is also investigating the possibility of using SPIMM in land mountings.

In October of 2020, at the Euronaval 2020 expo, Danish defense manufacturer SH Defence revealed their modular shipborne equipment system, The Cube. The Cube is intended to use more than 128 interchangeable modules to allow ships with the system to engage in air, surface, and submarine warfare, or perform other tasks such as search and rescue or delivering humanitarian aid. The system requires internal rails running through spaces within a ship to move the modules through the hull of a ship to perform their missions from various spaces.

In 2023, the United States Navy test fired an RIM-174/SM-6 surface to air missile from a Mark 70 Payload Delivery System mounted on the flight deck of the Independence class littoral combat ship USS Savannah, significantly advancing the firepower of the littoral combat ships, which have been criticized for lacking in firepower. The Mark 70 system is also able to fire Tomahawk cruise missiles and Patriot PAC-3 land based surface to air missiles. The Navy had previously used the Mark 70 system to fire another RIM-174/SM-6 from the unmanned vessel USV Ranger. The Mark 70 system is a naval variant of the US Army's Typhon Missile System, both of which are descended from the navy's Mark 41 Vertical Launch System

In late 2025, the small container ship Zhong Da 79 was seen in Shanghai with radars, a large VLS array, CIWS, and other self defense and survivability systems, such as decoys and extra life rafts. The ship was covered in several standard 40 foot intermodal containers, forming an enlarged superstructure and weapons deck. At their highest, they reached 3 containers tall near the superstructure, carrying Type 366 fire control radar, rotating phased array radars, and possibly other radar arrays or communications gear. Ahead of this was an array of VLS armed containers, 5 wide and 3 long each containing 4 cells, totaling 60. Ahead of the weapons deck was another stack of containers, similar to the one bearing the radar, except with a Type 1130 CIWS, Type 726 decoy launchers, and extra life rafts. The VLS cells could be used for many weapons, but would most likely be used for either anti-ship cruise missiles or surface to air missiles. The ship was later seen with 9 missile and 3 CIWS and countermeasure-bearing containers removed, replaced by 2 UCAVs and a launch ramp, presenting a drone program with a similarity to the Anglo-American Arapaho program. The ship did not have any equipment for recovery of the drones. The addition of these drones, if armed with air-to-air missiles, grants a ship standoff range, allowing it to keep potential threats further away, thus keeping itself out of danger, an especially important goal when operating from a relatively unarmored ship like a merchant vessel, as opposed to the much more durable traditional surface combatants of a traditional navy.

In November of 2026, Turkish firm Aselsan revealed variants of their Gökdeniz and GÖKSUR gun and SAM based CIWS systems designed to be installed aboard merchant vessels. Unveiled at the Euronaval 2026 naval defense Expo, the system is designed to be modular, so that shipboard installation will require minimal structural changes to be made to host vessels.

Also at Euronaval 2026, the British firm BAE Systems announced their Sea Tridon program. Developed from the Bofors 40 Mk4 gun, It is designed to operate in a C-UAS role when installed aboard various ships. Overall, the program is split between 3 different subsystem variants: The base Sea Tridon for use aboard currently unarmed ships, Sea Tridon^{c}, intended for container ships otherwise unable to accept the standard Sea Tridon, and Sea Trinity, intended for use aboard naval vessels. Sea Tridon and Sea Tridon^{c} both have integrated electro-optical guidance systems, and Sea Trinity has integrated radars for fire control, along with BAE's special programmable 3P ammunition.

== Legal difficulties ==
The process of arming merchant ships brings up quite severe legal difficulties not traditionally experienced by navies. Standard naval ships display markings which identify them as such, however these markings are not worn by merchant ships. The usage of these markings is to show which ships are combatants, and as such, are then also valid targets. If a merchant ship were to be converted to become a warship, it would require extra markings to designate it as such, need to be registered as a warship, and be commanded by a military officer.

If a ship not bearing these markings were to participate in combat and fire upon an enemy vessel, it could then legitimize attacks upon any other merchant ships in a combat area, as they are unable to be distinguished as merchant or combatant ships.

The biggest risk to these laws is presented by China, which has previously participated in illegal and reckless behavior, especially in the South China Sea when seizing islands such as Woody Island
