= AWS (disambiguation) =

AWS, or Amazon Web Services, is an on-demand cloud computing provider.

AWS or aws may also refer to:

== Technology ==
- Autonomous Web Services, a service offered between electronic devices via the Internet
- Advanced Wireless Services, a telecommunications spectrum band
- Apple Workgroup Server, a family of workgroup servers by Apple
- Automatic Warning System, a railway safety system
- Arctic Weather Satellite, a European weather satellite
- Automatic weather station, a meteorological instrument

== Businesses and organizations ==
- Alien Workshop (founded 1990), a skateboard company
- American Welding Society (founded 1919)
- Association of Women Surgeons (founded 1981), an international organisation
- Austria Wirtschaftsservice Gesellschaft (founded 1954), an Austrian bank
- AWS, a 1970s German car maker
- Solidarity Electoral Action (Polish: Akcja Wyborcza Solidarność; 1996–2001), a political coalition in Poland

== Languages ==
- Afrikaanse Woordelys en Spelreëls, the Afrikaans Word List and Spelling Rules
- South Awyu language (ISO 639-3: aws)

== Military ==
- Aircraft Warning Service, a former civilian service of the U.S. Army Ground Observer Corps
- Affordable Weapon System, a U.S. Navy cruise missile system in a shipping container
- American War Standard, a plan for the electronic color code of small radio parts
- Arctic Warfare Suppressed, an internally suppressed bolt-action sniper rifle
- Autonomous weapon system, also known as a lethal autonomous weapon

== Music ==
- AWS (band), a Hungarian post-hardcore band
- American Wind Symphony, an American musical ensemble
- A Wilhelm Scream, an American rock band
  - A Wilhelm Scream (EP), a 2009 record by A Wilhelm Scream

== Other uses ==
- All-women shortlist, an affirmative action practice in the United Kingdom
- Associate Writer to the Signet, a membership level in the Society of Writers to His Majesty's Signet
- Abdoel Wahab Sjaranie Regional General Hospital (Indonesian: Rumah Sakit Umum Daerah Abdul Wahab Sjahranie; RSUD AWS), a government-owned hospital located in Samarinda City, East Kalimantan, Indonesia
- Banu Aws (Sons of Aws), a tribe in Mohammad's era
- Alternative work schedule, a kind of flexitime used in certain U.S. government agencies
- Alcohol withdrawal syndrome, a medical condition

== See also ==
- ATWS, or automatic track warning system, a technical device used during track construction for occupational safety
- AW (disambiguation)
