= Kaman SH-2 Seasprite =

1959 anti-submarine helicopter family by Kaman

SH-2 Seasprite
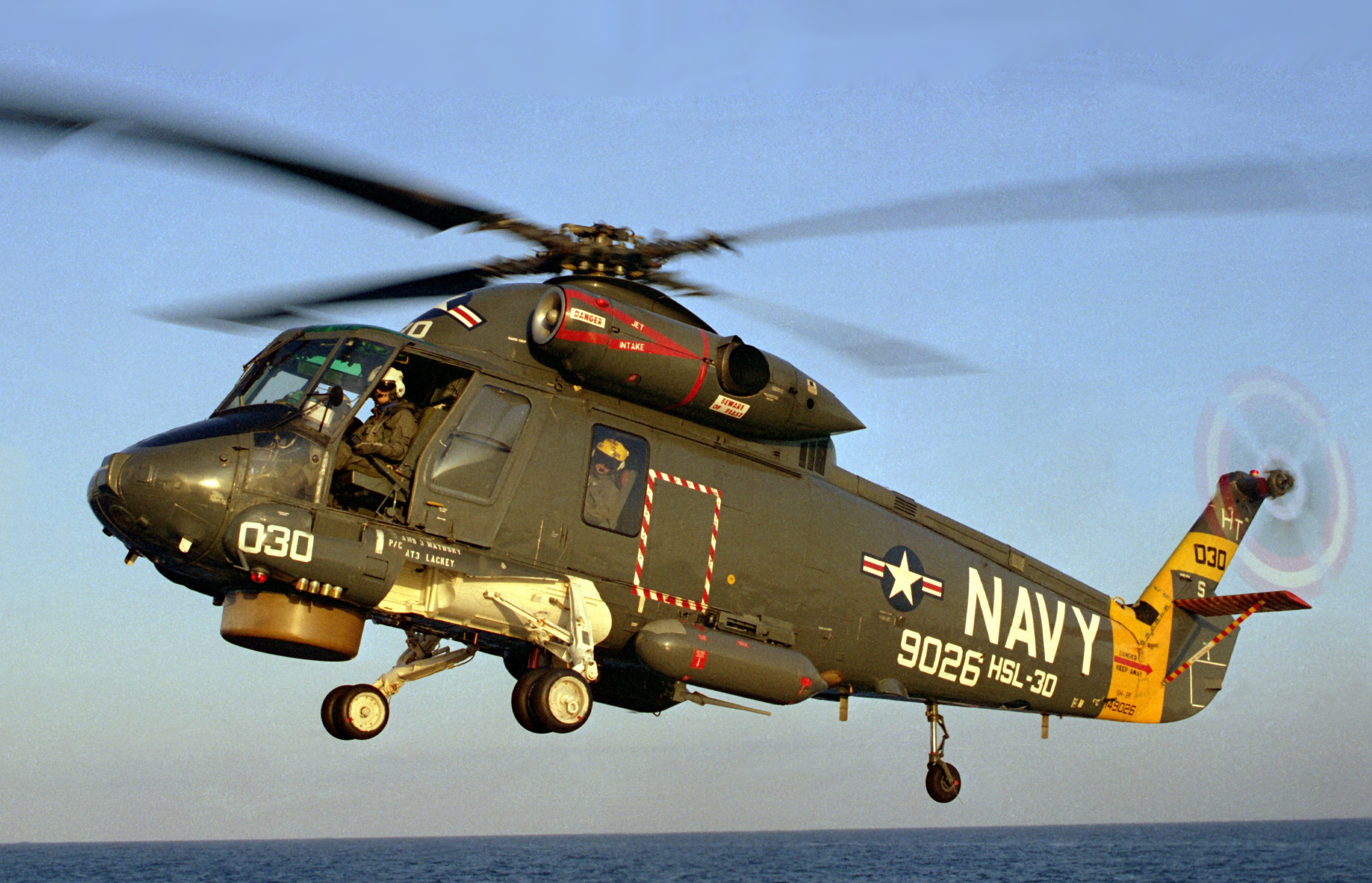
- SH-2F Seasprite of the US Navy, August 1983

General information
- Type: Anti-submarine warfare helicopter
- Manufacturer: Kaman Aircraft Corporation
- Status: Partially retired; G model in service
- Primary users: United States Navy (historical): Royal New Zealand Air Force; Polish Navy; Egyptian Navy
- Number built: 184

History
- Manufactured: 1959–1969; 1971–1990s: F/G model and conversions
- Introduction date: December 1962
- First flight: 2 July 1959 (HU2K-1)
- Retired: 1993: F (United States Navy); 2001: G (USN); 2008: Royal Australian Navy
- Variant: Kaman SH-2G Super Seasprite

The Kaman SH-2 Seasprite is a ship-based helicopter originally developed and produced by American manufacturer Kaman Aircraft Corporation. It has been typically used as a compact and fast-moving rotorcraft for utility and anti-submarine warfare (ASW) missions. Early on it was a modest sized single-engined naval utility helicopter, and progressed to twin-engine ASW and SAR, and the latest model served well into the 21st century, with the G model in active service in the 2020s with Egypt, New Zealand, Peru, and Poland.

The Seasprite, with the internal Kaman designation K-20, was developed in the late 1950s in response to a United States Navy (USN) requirement for a suitably fast and compact naval utility helicopter. The USN found the Seasprite attractive, and ordered four prototypes and an initial batch of 12 production helicopters as the HU2K-1. Under the 1962 United States Tri-Service aircraft designation system, the HU2K and HU2K-1 were re-designated as H-2 and UH-2A respectively. Kaman also pursued foreign sales; after showing interest, the Royal Canadian Navy (RCN) rejected the Seasprite due to an unexpected price increase and underperformance during sea trials. The USN addressed the poor performance by converting the single-engine Seasprites into a more powerful twin-engine configuration from 1968.

In October 1970, the USN selected the Seasprite as the interim Light Airborne Multi-Purpose System (LAMPS) helicopter, resulting in the SH-2D/F variant with enhanced ASW and anti-surface warfare sensors. Most UH-2s were converted into SH-2Fs.

USN Seasprites were used for ASW, search and rescue (SAR), utility and plane guard for aircraft carriers. In the Vietnam War they were mainly used for combat search and rescue (CSAR), and combat support and surface warfare during the Gulf War. The SH-2G Super Seasprite was the last variant and—in 2001—the last Seasprite to leave USN service. Retired USN Seasprites were offered as foreign aid in the 1990s and 2000s; this led to quite some interest and F and/or G models served with New Zealand, Poland, and Egypt. Retired models were also sent to aviation museums, and a number have been put on display. However, the latest upgraded models are still in frontline service with several navies around the world.

== Design and development ==
=== Origins ===
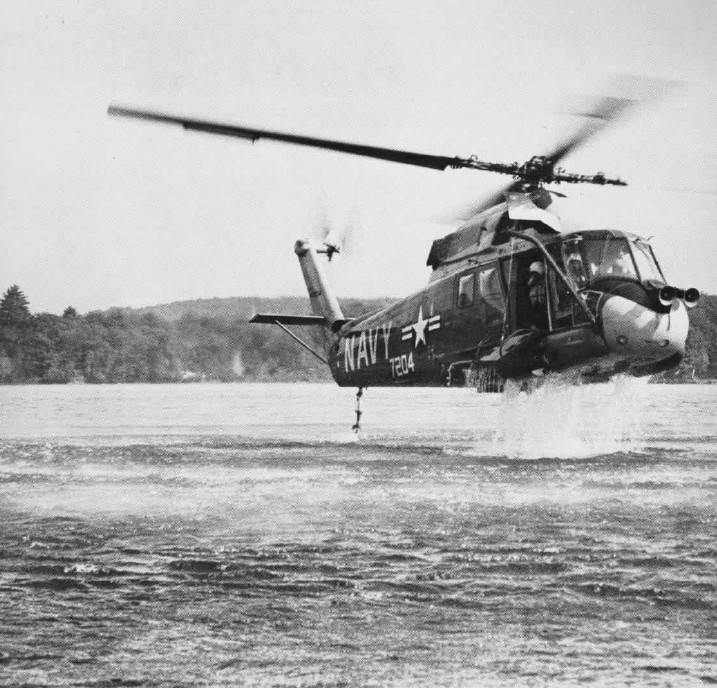
A YUH-2A during ditching trials, 1963

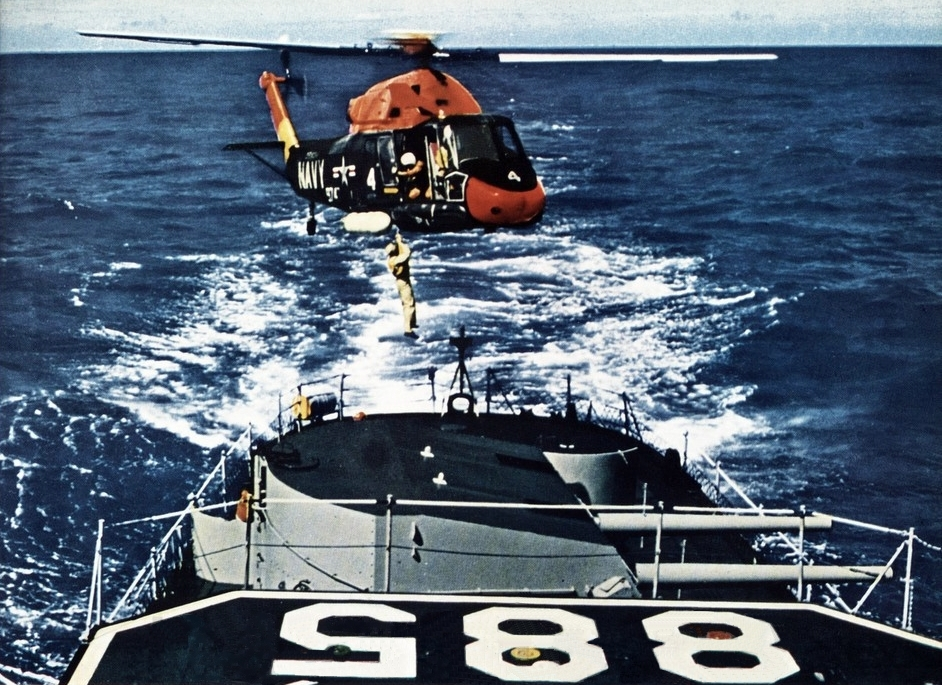
UH-2A hoists personnel from a ship, 1964. The Seasprite began its military career as modest naval utility helicopter.

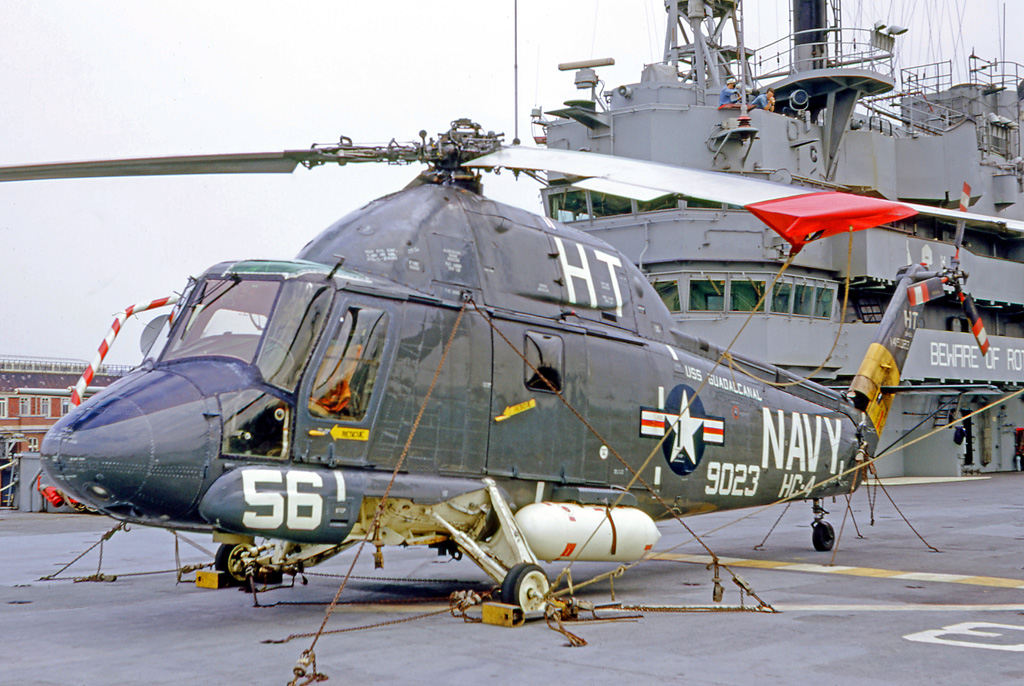
A UH-2A aboard USS Guadacanal, 1970

In 1956, the USN launched a competition for a compact, all-weather multipurpose naval helicopter, and encouraged submissions from private companies. Kaman responded with its K-20 design, a relatively conventional helicopter with a General Electric T58-8F turboshaft engine driving a 44-foot four-bladed main rotor and a four-bladed tail rotor. Kaman won the competition and was awarded a contract to construct four prototypes and an initial batch of 12 production helicopters, designated as the HU2K-1.

In 1960, the HU2K was the RCN's preferred option for its ASW helicopter program, and the Government of Canada approved the purchase of 12 Seasprites for $14.5 million. However, the purchase was disrupted by Kaman suddenly raising the price to $23 million, and concerns that the helicopter's designed weight and performance criteria were overoptimistic. The RCN delayed making a decision until after the USN sea trials which confirmed that the HU2K was overweight and underpowered for their needs. In late-1961, Canada selected the competing Sikorsky CH-124 Sea King instead.

In the late-1960s, without further orders Kaman decided to terminate production after completing the USN order of 184 H-2s. However, in 1971, production was restarted for the improved SH-2F to operate from older frigates. This ability meant it stayed in service to the end of the century, as even with the introduction of the newer, larger and overall more capable Sikorsky SH-60 Sea Hawk which entered service starting in the mid-1980s, but it could not operate safety from the smaller flight decks like the smaller Seasprite.

=== Further developments ===
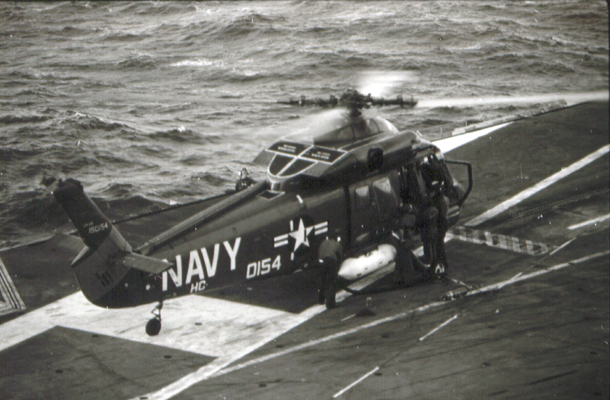
A UH-2C aboard USS Hancock between July 1968 and March 1969

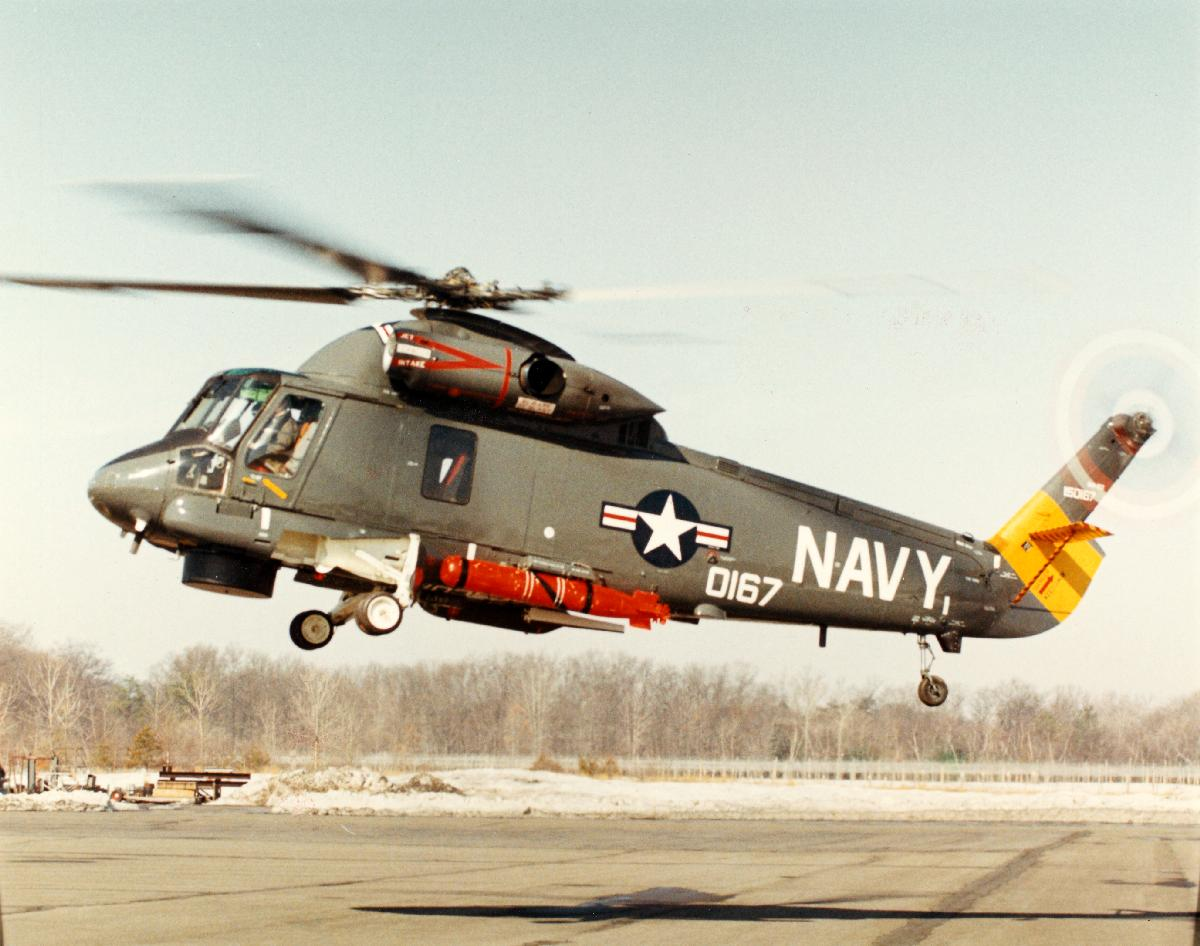
A Kaman SH-2D

The HU2K-1 and HU2K-1U were re-designated as the UH-2A and UH-2B respectively under the 1962 United States Tri-Service aircraft designation system. The Seasprite continued to receive modifications and improvements, including external stores mounts. Beginning in 1968, the USN's remaining UH-2s underwent a major conversion into a more powerful two-engine configuration.

In the 1960s, the US Army commissioned a gunship version, which was called the Kaman H-2 Tomahawk, and featured multiple M-60 machine guns (7.62) and options for rocket launchers, however, it was passed over in favor of the AH-1 Cobra.

In 1968 two UH-2Bs, were converted to NUH-2B. These were experimental versions for the U.S. Army, which attached a J85 turbojet to the helicopter, and achieved speeds over 220s mph, and the second prototype had wings attached. Both prototypes were returned to SH2-D after the trials.

In October 1970, the UH-2 was selected as the interim Light Airborne Multi-Purpose System (LAMPS) helicopter. LAMPS evolved during the 1960s from an urgent requirement to provide non-aviation ships with crewed support and ASW helicopters. The "LAMPS Mark I" suite included advanced sensors, processors, and display capabilities. H-2s upgraded with LAMPS were called SH-2Ds, and became mobile radar and sonar platforms that enhanced the situational awareness of ships.

The SH-2D first flew on 16 March 1971. Deliveries of the SH-2F began in 1973; the SH-2F included LAMPS I and other improvements, such as upgraded engines, an extended life main rotor, and a heavier take-off weight. During 1981, the USN ordered 60 SH-2Fs. From 1987, 16 SH-2Fs were upgraded with a chin-mounted forward-looking infrared (FLIR) sensor, chaff/flare launchers, dual rear-mounted infrared countermeasures, and missile/mine detecting equipment.

All but two USN H-2s were converted into SH-2Fs. Fiscal Year 1986 was the last time SH-2F were ordered; the final six were converted into SH-2G Super Seasprites.

== Operational history ==
=== United States ===
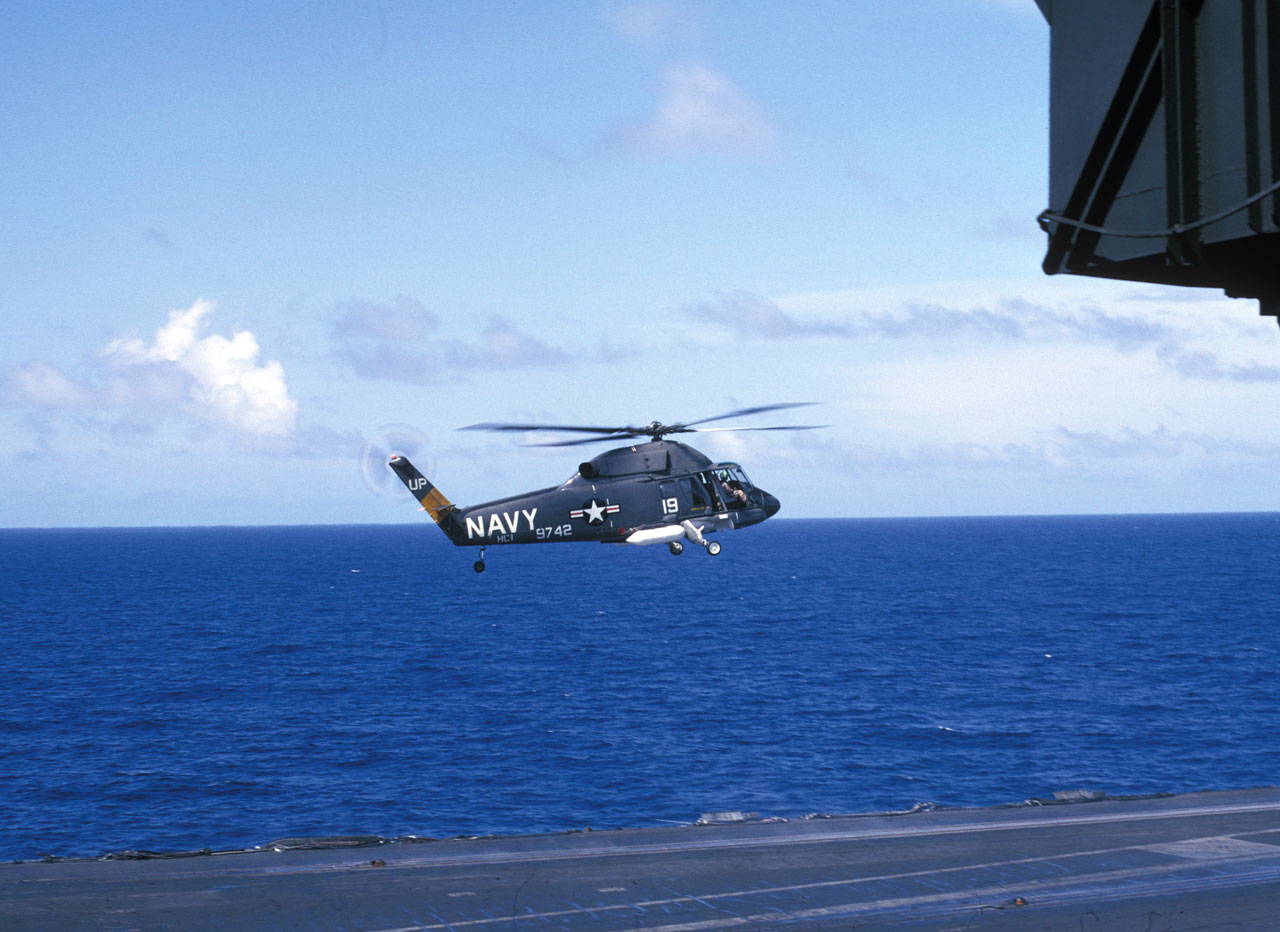
A UH-2A on plane guard duty hovers near the USS Kitty Hawk in March 1966.

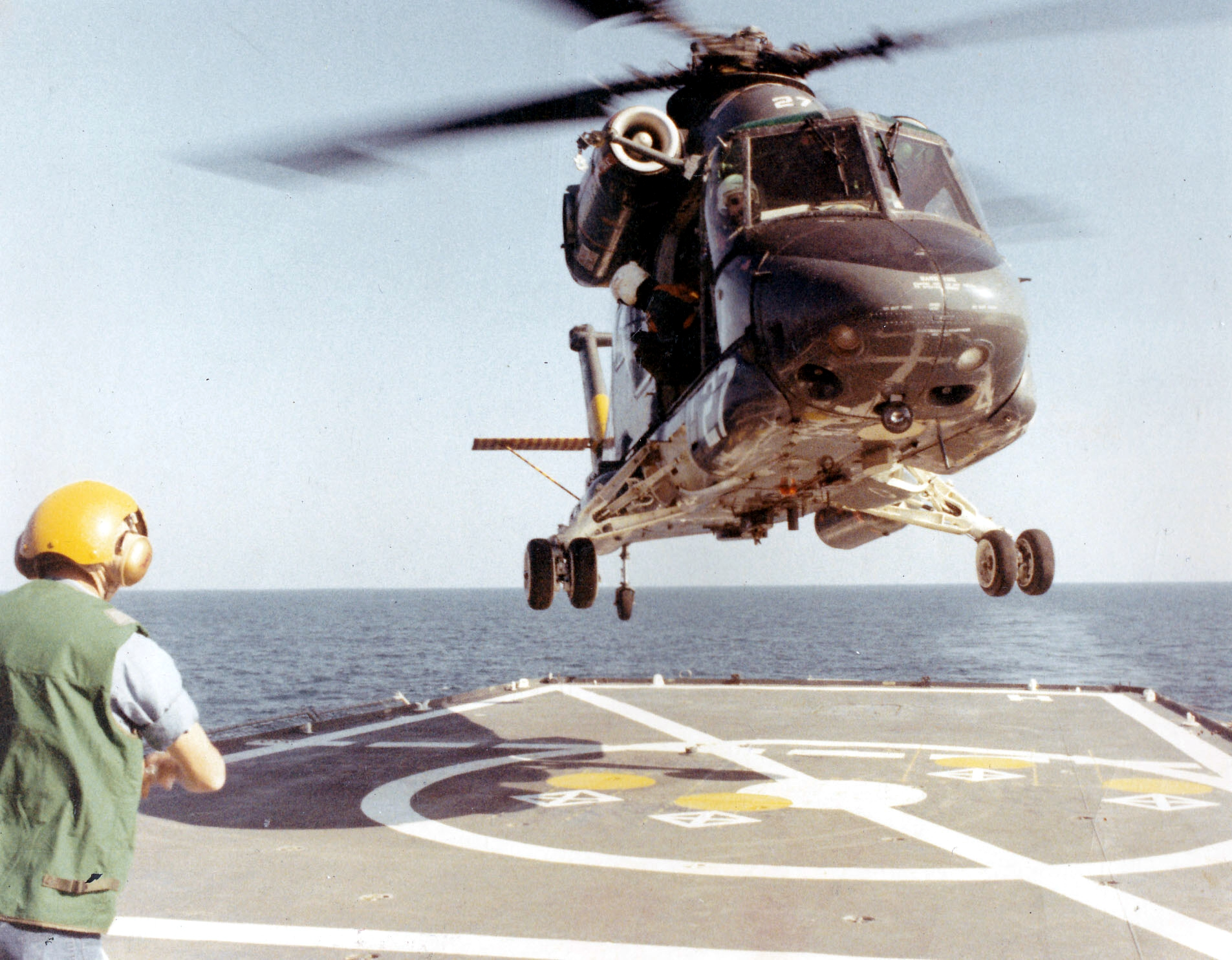
A HH-2D, which was a search and rescue version, on approach in 1970

The UH-2 entered operational service with the USN in 1962. The single engine greatly restricted performance. Kaman was ordered to convert all of the Seasprites to a twin-engine configuration. The upgraded helicopters had a 130 knots (240 km/h) airspeed and a 411 nautical miles (761 km) operating range. The USN operated nearly 200 Seasprites in multiple roles, including ASW, SAR, and utility transport. Under typical operational conditions, USN aircraft carrier deployed with several UH-2s in the plane guard and SAR roles.

The UH-2 was introduced in time to see action in the Tonkin Gulf incident in August 1964. The Seasprite's main role in the Vietnam War was CSAR of downed aircrews at sea and overland, reliance on the Seasprite in this role increased as the conflict intensified, such as during Operation Rolling Thunder in 1965. During October 1966, helicopter-based SAR teams recovered 103 out of 269 downed pilots.

During the 1970s, the conversion of UH-2s to the SH-2 anti-submarine configuration provided the U.S. Navy with its first dedicated ASW helicopter capable of operating from vessels other than its aircraft carriers. The compact size of the SH-2 allowed the type to be operated from flight decks that were too small for the majority of helicopters; this factor would later play a role in the U.S. Navy's decision to acquire the improved SH-2F during the early 1980s.

In late 1982, an SH-2F took part in trials in support of the Arapaho Containerized Aircraft Handling System aboard the container ship MA-257, named Export Leader. Amongst other models, the helicopters conducted 178 night landings. These tests also included simultaneous landings of multiple aircraft, although whether the SH-2F took part in these cannot be confirmed. While the tests achieved initial successes, the system was ultimately not adopted.

The SH-2F fleet was utilized to enforce and support Operation Earnest Will in July 1987, Operation Praying Mantis in April 1988, and Operation Desert Storm during January 1991 in the Persian Gulf region. The countermeasures and additional equipment present upon the SH-2F allowed the type to conduct combat support and surface warfare missions within these hostile environments, which had an often-minimal submarine threat. In April 1994, the SH-2F was retired from active service with the U.S. Navy; the timing corresponded with the retirement of the last of the Vietnam-era Knox-class frigates that were unable to accommodate the new and larger SH-60 Sea Hawks, which were used to replace the aging Seasprites.

In 1991, the U.S. Navy had begun to receive deliveries of the new SH-2G Super Seasprite; a total of 18 converted SH-2Fs and 6 new-built SH-2Gs were produced. These were assigned to Naval Reserve squadrons, the SH-2G entered service with HSL-84 in 1993. The SH-2 served in some 600 deployments and flew 1.5 million flight hours before the last of the type were finally retired from US Navy service in mid-2001.

=== New Zealand ===
The Royal New Zealand Navy (RNZN) replaced its Westland Wasps with an initial batch of four interim SH-2F Seasprites (formerly operated by the U.S. Navy), operated and maintained by a mix of Navy and Air Force personnel known as No. 3 Squadron RNZAF Naval Support Flight, to operate with ANZAC class frigates until the fleet of five new SH-2G(NZ) Super Seasprites were delivered. In October 2005, the Navy air element was transferred to No. 6 Squadron RNZAF at RNZAF Base Auckland in Whenuapai. RNZN Seasprites have seen service in East Timor. 10 of the 11 SH-2G(A)s rejected by the Royal Australian Navy were purchased in 2014 to replace the five RNZN SH-2G(NZ) Seasprites that had required either a MLU (Mid Life Upgrade) or replacement due to corrosion issues, maintenance problems and obsolescence. Kaman modified the ex-Australian aircraft and renamed them SH-2G(I), with the last one being delivered to New Zealand in early 2016. Eight of the aircraft are flying with the ninth and tenth aircraft being attritional aircraft used for spares etc. The 11th aircraft is held by Kaman as a prototype and test aircraft. The five SH-2G(NZ) have been sold to Peru. A SH-2F (ex-RNZN, NZ3442) is preserved in the Royal New Zealand Air Force Museum, donated to the museum by Kaman Aircraft Corporation after an accident while in service with the RNZN.

=== Exports ===
During the late 1990s, the United States decided to offer the surplus U.S. Navy SH-2Fs as foreign aid to a number of overseas countries. Among those to be offered the type included Greece, which had been offered six, and Turkey, which had been offered 14, but they rejected the offer.

Egypt opted to acquire four SH-2F under this aid program, they were mainly used for spares in to support of their existing fleet of ten SH-2Gs. In the early 2000s, Australia acquired the SH-2G model, with ten delivered by 2007, 11 had been ordered in the late 1990s, but they only served from 2003 to 2008; the RAN consolidated on using the SH-60 Seahawk and was launching the MRH-90 Taipan program at the time. Poland chose to acquire the later SH-2G variant. Peru acquired Ex-RNZAF SH-2Gs and they entered service in the late 2010s.

== Variants ==
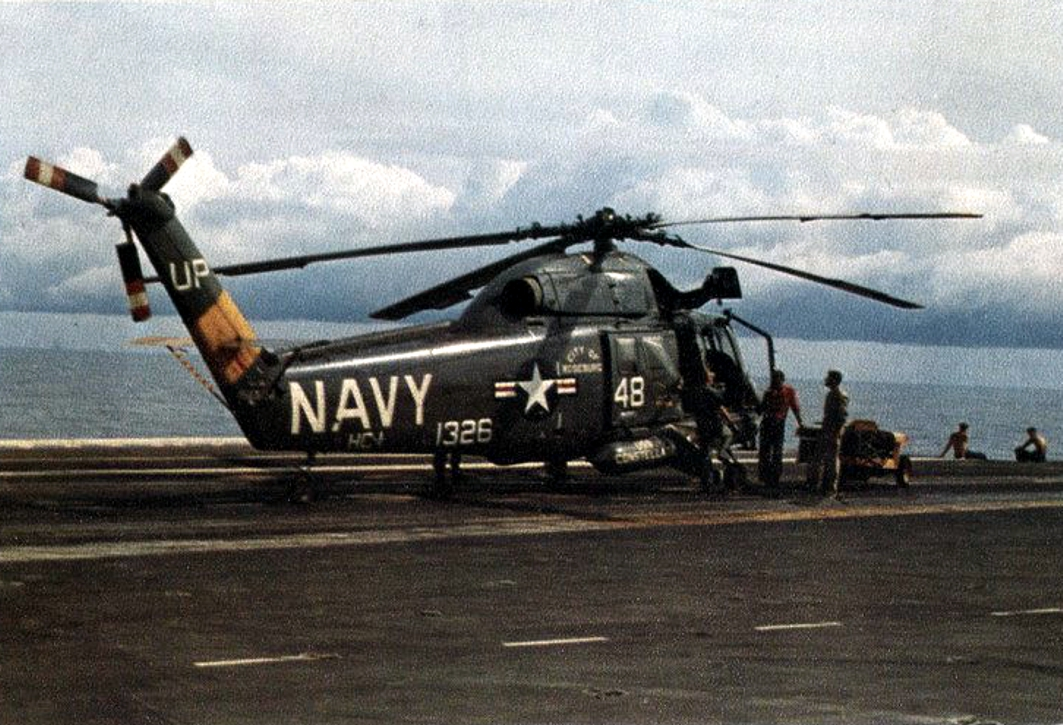
UH-2B on the USS Constellation (CV-64) in 1967

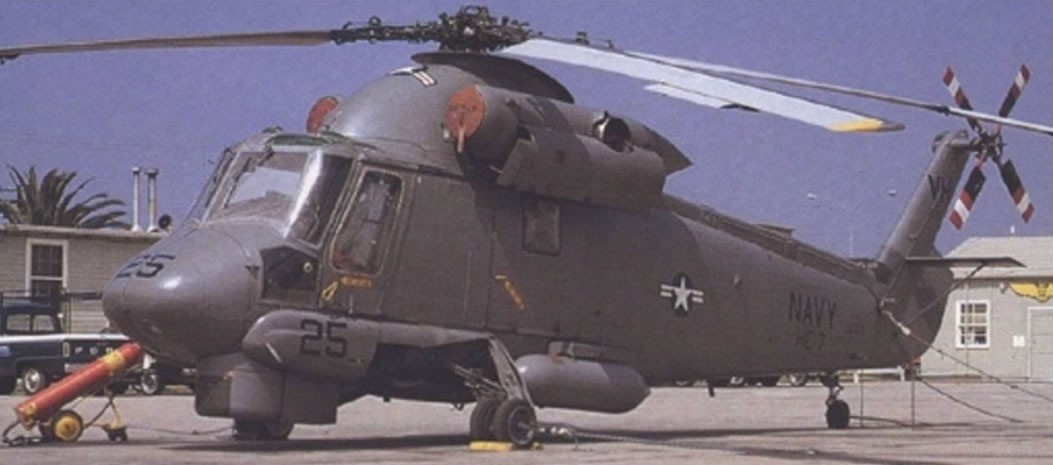
A Vietnam War-era HH-2C combat search and rescue

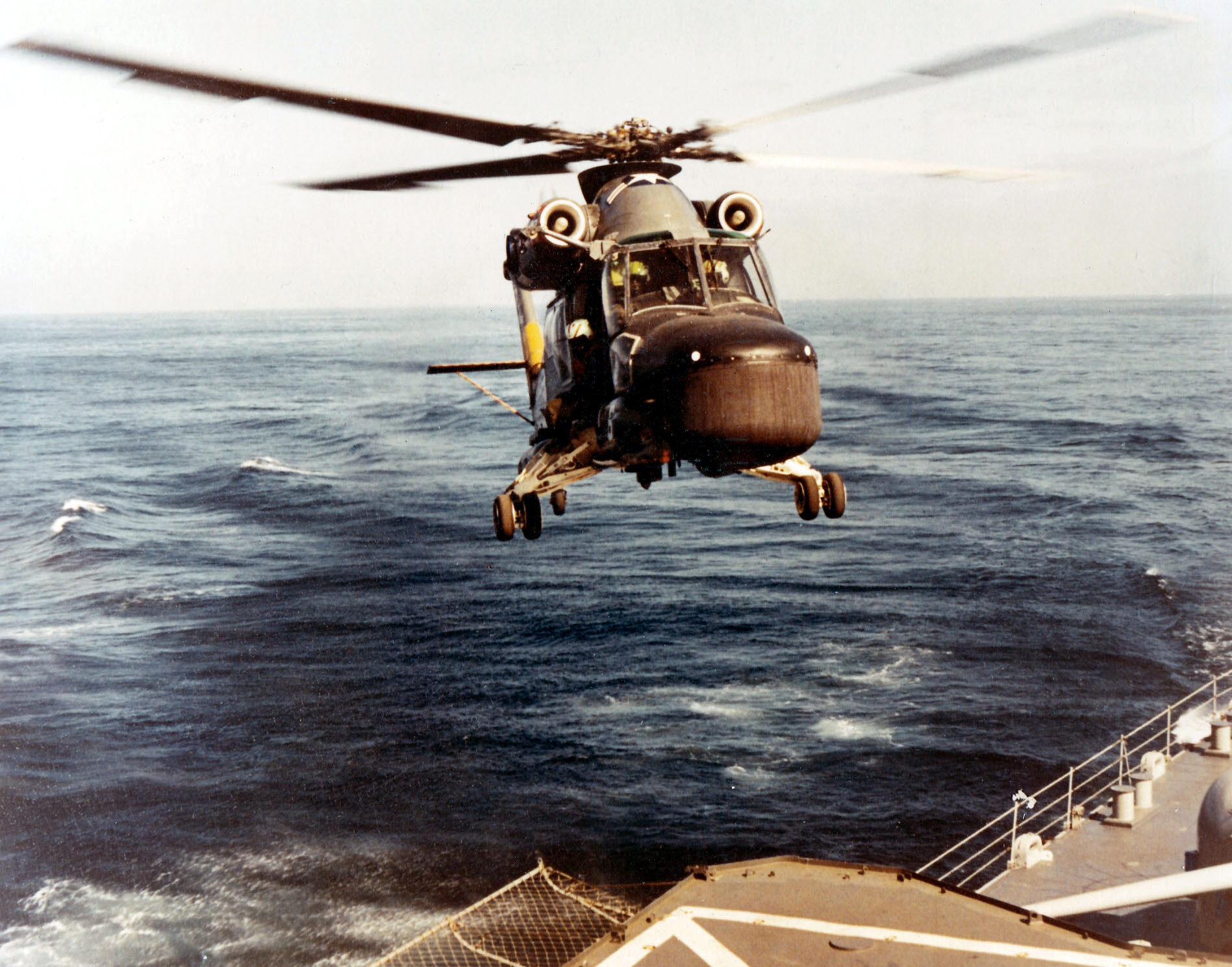
YSH-2E with experimental nose antenna, in the early 70s for LAMPS

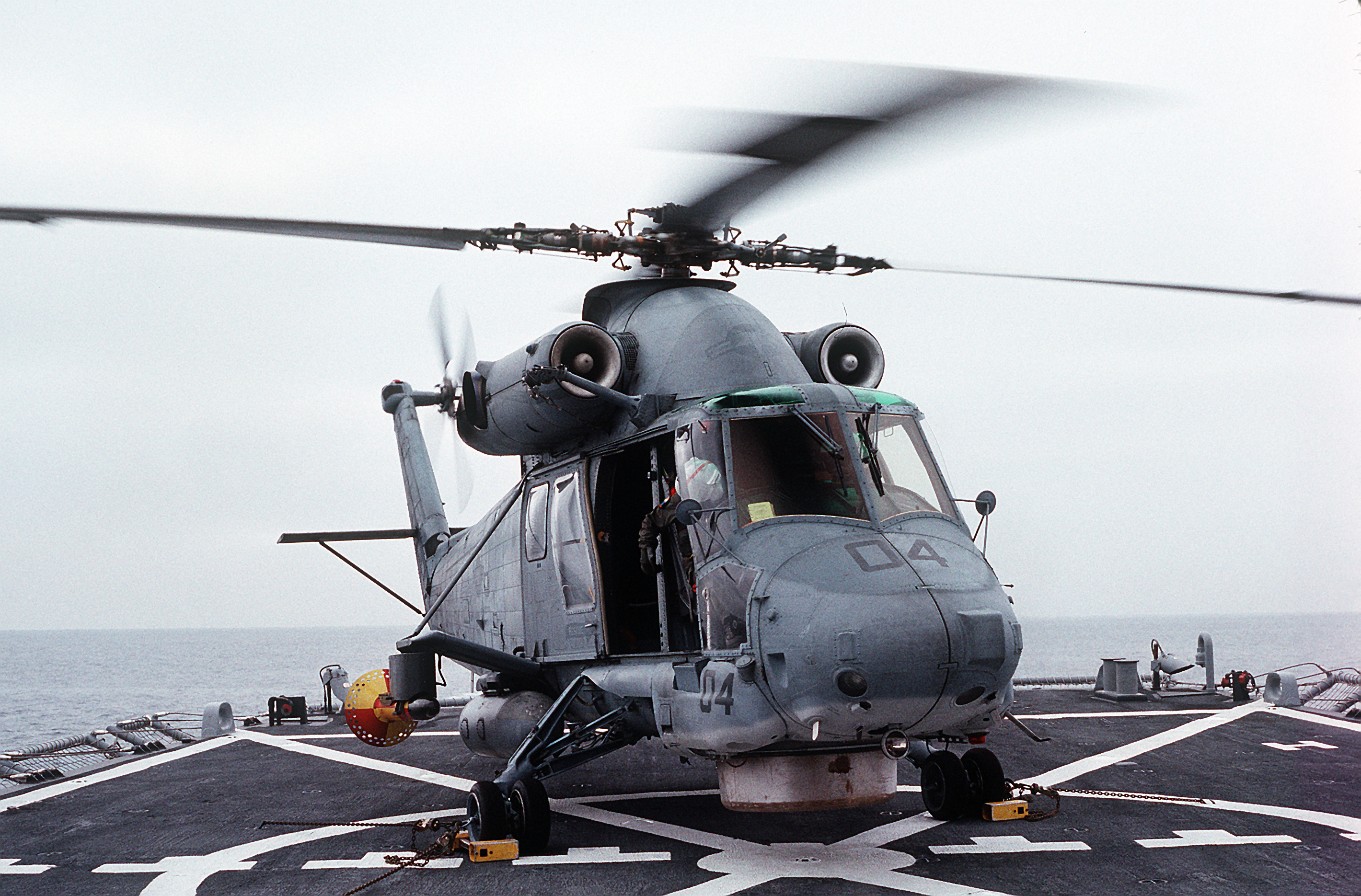
SH-2F in 1986 on the deck of a frigate

YHU2K-1
Four test and evaluation prototypes powered by an 875-shp General Electric T58-GE-6 turboshaft engine. Later redesignated YUH-2A in 1962.
HU2K-1
Utility transport helicopter, powered by a 1,250-shp (932-kW) General Electric T58-GE-8B turboshaft engine. Initial production version. Later redesignated UH-2A in 1962. 88 built.
UH-2B
Utility transport helicopter, same as UH-2A without IFR instruments, although these were later added without a subsequent change to the designation. 102 built.
H-2 "Tomahawk"
A gunship version based on UH-2A. One prototype was built and tested for the U.S. Army in 1963. The Army selected it in November 1963, but the planned order for 220 H-2s was forsaken for additional UH-1 orders.
NUH-2B
One aircraft (147978) fitted with Beechcraft Queen Air wings and a General Electric J85 turbojet engine in May 1968.
UH-2C
UH-2A and UH-2B helicopters fitted with two General Electric T58-GE-8B turboshaft engines. One former UH-2A acted as a prototype and was followed by 40 conversions from UH-2A and UH-2B.
NUH-2C
One UH-2C helicopter (147981) was modified with stub-wings and pylons for weapons trials, missiles fitted included the AIM-9 Sidewinder and AIM-7 Sparrow III air-to-air missiles.
NUH-2D
Redesignation of the NUH-1C test and evaluation helicopter.
HH-2C
Search and rescue helicopter, armed with a single Minigun in a chin-mounted turret and two waist mounted 7.62mm machine guns, six conversions.
HH-2D
Search and rescue helicopter, without any armament or armor but fitted with T58-GE-8F engines and four-bladed tail rotor, 67 conversions from UH-2A and UH-2Bs.
SH-2D
Anti-submarine warfare helicopter, 20 conversions from earlier models.
YSH-2E
Two test and evaluation helicopters, fitted with an advanced radar and LAMPS equipment.
SEALITE
Intended as the definitive version of the Seasprite for the LAMPS program. A 'lightweight' design for use on naval destroyers and escort vessels which had helicopter deck loading limits of about 6,000 lb (2,720 kg). Was to utilize the dynamic system of the basic UH-2 helicopter, but with a small, lighter fuselage, new skid landing gear, one Pratt & Whitney (UACL) PT6T (T400-CP-400) turboshaft engine, and a three-blade folding rotor with a new rotor hub to keep the maximum gross weight at 7,900 lb (3,583 kg). Planned in three variants, ASW, CMD (Cruise Missile Defense, i.e. anti-ASM), and General Purpose. The company designation for the SEALITE was K-820. Due to post-Vietnam cutbacks, the SH-2F was ultimately procured instead.
SH-2F
Anti-submarine warfare helicopter, powered by two 1,350 shp (1,007 kW) General Electric T58-GE-8F turboshaft engines. Improved version. Mostly conversions from SH-2Ds and earlier models. Bureau numbers 161641 through 161652 and 161654 through 163214. A total of 59 aircraft, entered service as SH-2Fs.
YSH-2G
1 SH-2G prototype converted from an SH-2F.
Kaman SH-2G Super Seasprite
Anti-submarine warfare helicopter, powered by two 1,723 shp (1,285 kW) General Electric T700-GE-401 turboshaft engines.

== Operators ==
New Zealand

- Royal New Zealand Air Force
  - No. 6 Squadron RNZAF

United States

- United States Navy

== Aircraft on display ==
New Zealand

- NZ3442 – SH-2F on static display at the Air Force Museum of New Zealand in Wigram, Christchurch.

SH-2F Seasprite on display in museum ship at Alameda, California

United States

- 149021 – SH-2F on static display at the USS Hornet Museum in Alameda, California.
- 149022 – SH-2F on static display at Naval Air Station North Island in Coronado, California.
- 149026 – SH-2F on static display at Naval Station Norfolk Chambers Field in Norfolk, Virginia.
- 149031 – HH‑2D on static display at the American Helicopter Museum & Education Center in West Chester, Pennsylvania. It was the last HH-2D in the U.S. Navy and used the callsign "Copyright 14" (or callsign "Shaka 14").
- 150155 – SH-2F on static display at the Pima Air and Space Museum in Tucson, Arizona.
- 150157 – SH-2F on static display at the USS Midway Museum in San Diego, California. It is painted in the markings of its last assignment, HSL-33.
- 150175 – SH-2F on static display at the USS New Jersey in Camden, New Jersey. It is painted as bureau number 150141.
- 150181 – SH-2F on static display at Battleship Memorial Park in Mobile, Alabama. It is painted in the markings of its last assignment, HSL-31.
- 151312 – SH-2F on static display at the National Naval Aviation Museum at Naval Air Station Pensacola in Pensacola, Florida.
- 151321 – SH-2F on static display at the North American Aerospace Museum in McMinnville, Oregon.
- 152201 – SH-2F on static display at the Louisiana Military Museum in Ruston, Louisiana.
- 161905 – SH-2F on static display at the New England Air Museum in Windsor Locks, Connecticut.
- 162583 – SH-2F on static display at the Aviation Challenge Camp at the U.S. Space and Rocket Center in Huntsville, Alabama. It was flown by HSL-36 with the callsign "Lamplighter 342".

== Specifications (SH-2F Seasprite) ==
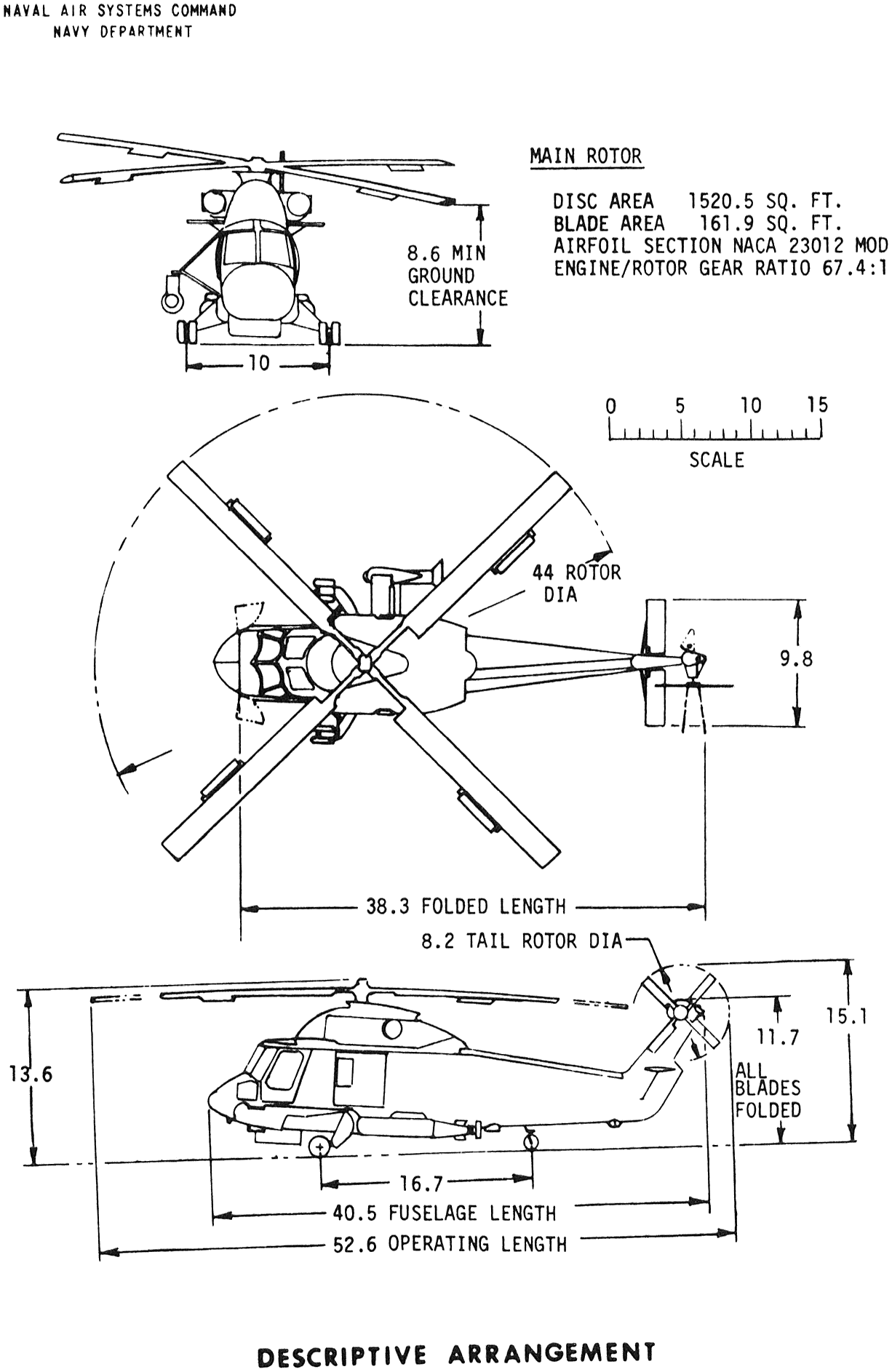
3-view line drawing of the Kaman SH-2F Seasprite

Data from Jane's all the World's Aircraft 1976–77, Encyclopedia of world military aircraft : Volume One

General characteristics

- Crew: 3 (Pilot, Co-pilot/Tactical Coordinator (TACCO), Sensor Operator (SENSO))
- Capacity: 1 pax with litter patient (with LAMPS installed) / 4 pax and two litter patients (with Sonobuoy launcher removed)
- Length: 38 ft 4 in (11.68 m) nose and blades folded
- Height: 13 ft 7 in (4.14 m) to top of rotor head
- Empty weight: 7,040 lb (3,193 kg)
- Max takeoff weight: 12,500 lb (5,670 kg) normal max
- Maximum overload take-off weight: 13,300 lb (6,000 kg)
- Fuel capacity: 396 US gal (330 imp gal; 1,500 L) internal fuel tanks; 120 US gal (100 imp gal; 450 L) auxiliary external fuel tanks.
- Powerplant: 2 × General Electric T58-GE-8F turboshaft engines, 1,350 shp (1,010 kW) each
- Main rotor diameter: 44 ft 0 in (13.41 m)
- Main rotor area: 1,520.53 sq ft (141.262 m^{2}) 4-bladed main and tail rotors
- Rotor blade section: - root: KM23014.86; tip: KM23011.47

Performance

- Maximum speed: 143 kn (165 mph, 265 km/h) at sea level
- Cruise speed: 130 kn (150 mph, 240 km/h)
- Range: 367 nmi (422 mi, 680 km) with maximum fuel
- Endurance: 5 hours with 2 external tanks
- Service ceiling: 22,500 ft (6,900 m)
- Hover ceiling IGE: 18,600 ft (5,700 m)
- Hover ceiling OGE: 15,400 ft (4,700 m)
- Rate of climb: 2,440 ft/min (12.4 m/s)

Armament

- Hardpoints: 2× side fuselage mounting stub/pylon stations
- Missiles: Non-US aircraft carry a variety of guided missiles, including the AGM-65 Maverick (often used in the anti-ship role) and dedicated anti-ship missiles.
- Torpedoes: 2× Mk 46 or Mk 50 ASW torpedoes

Avionics

- LN 66HP radar
- Improved tactical navigation and communications suites

== See also ==
Related development

- Kaman SH-2G Super Seasprite

Aircraft of comparable role, configuration, and era

- Sikorsky SH-60 Seahawk
- Westland Lynx
- Kamov Ka-25

Related lists

- List of military aircraft of the United States
