= Check-mate system =

The check-mate system was a system of ship identification used by the Allies of World War II. It was used by the Royal Navy when on patrol looking for German auxiliary cruisers and others ships that had been disguised by the Axis. A patrolling warship or aircraft would identify a suspect ship via the Admiralty in London; this step became necessary and was introduced after a British ship that had been captured by Germany was twice passed off as British when challenged in October 1942.

== Background ==
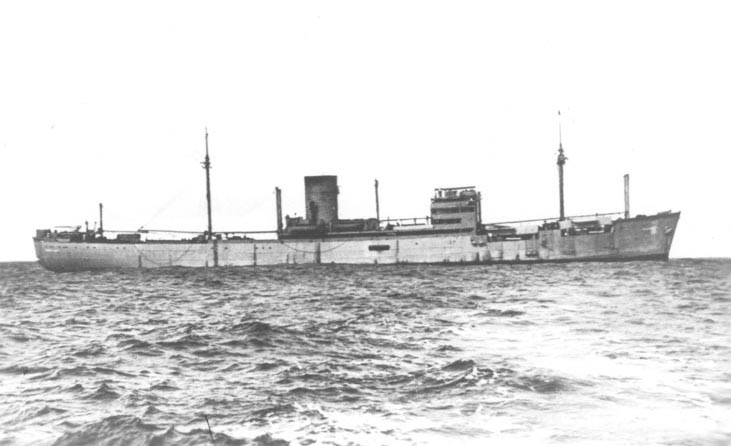
The German auxiliary cruiser Atlantis was disguised as the Norwegian MV Tamesis and the Dutch MVs Abbekerk and Brastagi at various times during commerce raiding.

German auxiliary cruisers prowled the Atlantic and Indian Oceans searching for Allied merchant ships. Axis merchant ships overseas when the war began were used to refuel these auxiliary cruisers, pocket battleships and long-range U-boats. Allied merchant ships captured by German ships could be similarly used for supply. These Axis-crewed ships pretended to be neutral or Allied merchant ships if they encountered Allied patrols.

Before check-mate, Allied warships patrolling for Axis ships were given a list of Allied ships they were likely to see and the list was periodically revised by radio signals from shore. Through the first half of the war, Allied warships frequently encountered Allied ships not on their lists. Only half of British ships correctly answered a challenge with their secret code and foreign ships were even less likely to do this. The lists often contained misspelled names or former names of renamed ships.

== Implementation ==
The check-mate system became fully operational on 8 June 1943. From that date the Allies estimated the daily position of every independently routed ocean-going merchant ship in the world. The check-mate system required the Allied patrol aircraft or warship to identify each intercepted ship with a Merchant Ship Description Code and a Merchant Ship Silhouette Characteristics Register in comparison to their list of anticipated contacts and the secret signal.

If identification was uncertain, the Allied patrol could make a signal en clair to shore and expect a reply within a few minutes. The query format was:

- EMERGENCY CHECK (stranger's code letters) (alleged name) (position - by lettered coordinates)

Possible replies were:

- MATE TRUE (the ship could be there),
- MATE FALSE (the identified ship could not be at that location), or
- MATE DOUBTFUL (requiring further investigation by the patrol)

== Bibliography ==
- Brice, Martin (1981). Axis Blockade Runners of World War II. Annapolis, MD: Naval Institute Press. ISBN 0-87021-908-1.
- Muggenthaler, August Karl (1977). German Raiders of World War II. Englewood Cliffs, New Jersey: Prentice-Hall. ISBN 0-13-354027-8.
