= Arapaho Containerized Aircraft Handling System =

United States and British Navy project

The Arapaho Containerized Aircraft Handling System was a system developed in the 1970s and 1980s by the United States Navy to equip ships of the United States merchant marine with flight decks, hangars, and ground support equipment to quickly convert them into small aircraft carriers, able to operate various V/STOL combat aircraft, especially antisubmarine helicopters. The entire system was designed to fit into standard intermodal containers, allowing wide modularity and easy transportation and installation. The modularity and relative simplicity of the system relative to traditional nuclear super carriers was intended to reduce cost, allowing them to be deployed on missions which would not require carrier battle groups and their intricate offensive and defensive capabilities. However, tests eventually showed that the program was not practical.

== Background ==
In World War II, high-speed passenger liners were used to transport troops in some cases. In the 1970s, the Navy studied ways to take advantage of the speed of merchant ships for military purposes, a form of armed merchantman for the Cold War.

== Testing ==
Between October 5–7 of 1982, one unit was tested onboard the 18,000 ton displacement container ship MA-257 Export Leader in Chesapeake Bay and at Hampton Roads. While the ship's engines remained offline, meaning it was stationary for the duration of the test and had to be towed to the test areas, it conducted 178 day and 45 night landings with pilots from both the United States Navy and Marine Corps, as well as British, Australian, Canadian, New Zealand, and West German pilots. Six different types of aircraft were included in the testing program: a Kaman SH-2F, Boeing Vertol CH-46D, CH-46E, and a Bell HH-1K, along with two SH-3Hs, and a UH-1N, which completed the 45 night landings. These tests included simultaneous landings of multiple aircraft, and 15 of the night landings also included an embarked British officer. Preceding the testing program, the entire 900 short tons (820 t) system had been broken down, packed up, and trucked from New Jersey to Virginia, a distance of 300 miles (480 km). Once arriving at Norfolk, the system was loaded onto Export Leader in just 11 hours, while the extra time required for internal hookups and checkouts would have been possible to complete at sea if needed, demonstrating the flexibility of the system.

During this time, British Aerospace was also looking into containerized air defenses for merchant ships, known as SCADS (Shipborne Containerized Air Defense System). One Arapaho unit was leased to the Royal Navy in April 1983 and was integrated onboard MV (motor vessel) Astronomer, which saw service in the Falklands War, before being renamed RFA Reliant, which then saw service from 1983–1986. Reliant was also equipped with additional communication gear, underway and vertical replenishment equipment, along with HIFR (helicopter in-flight refueling) equipment, and self defense weapons, including 20mm Oerlikon guns, chaff, and anti-torpedo decoys. In late 1984, Reliant participated in a series of missions in the Mediterranean, which were successful, however they revealed several problems with the containerized design of the ship, most notably that although the containerized modules were interlinked, there were still gaps between them which allowed leaks, vibrations, corrosion, and rust. In addition to this, the flight deck was found to damage the landing gear of any aircraft on deck. Further service in the south Atlantic emphasized these issues.

== Results ==
After being deemed infeasible after the trials aboard Reliant, Arapaho was either cancelled or slowly phased out over the late 1980s, and the Royal Navy returned its equipment. Reliant was withdrawn from service in 1986, and after several changes in ownership was scrapped in 1994 in Alang, India.

== Related programs ==
SS Atlantic Conveyor was a British container ship modified to carry aircraft in a similar manner to the Arapaho system, operated during the 1982 Falklands War along with its sister ship, the SS Atlantic Causeway. RFA Argus was another container ship modified to carry aircraft, which also operated during the Falklands War.

In the late 1980s, the U.S. Army studied an Arapaho system for converting commercial container ships into helicopter support facilities.

== See also ==
- Merchant aircraft carrier, another WWII program of similar intent
- Operation Ivory Soap, a WWII program to convert Liberty ships into mobile repair centers for aircraft
- Project Flat Top, a Vietnam War program to convert a seaplane tender into a mobile repair center for helicopters
- Shipborne Containerized Air Defense System, a class of similar containerized systems, using missiles instead of aircraft
- Sea Control Ship, a concept for a purpose-built ship to carry out a similar mission
