= RFA Reliant (A131) =

Helicopter support ship of the Royal Fleet Auxiliary

History

United Kingdom
- Name: RFA Reliant
- Builder: Gdańsk Shipyard
- Launched: 6 July 1976
- Completed: 20 January 1977 as Astronomer
- Commissioned: 16 November 1983 as RFA Reliant
- Decommissioned: 25 July 1986
- Renamed: Admiralty Island; April 1989 as Wealthy River
- Stricken: 1986
- Identification: IMO number: 7383889; Pennant number: A131
- Fate: Sold back into merchant service on 27 October 1986; Arrived at Alang for demolition on 9 July 1998

General characteristics
- Displacement: 28,156 GT
- Length: 204.22 m (670.0 ft)
- Beam: 30.99 m (101.7 ft)
- Draught: 10.021 m (32.88 ft)
- Propulsion: 2 x 10 cyl Sulzer diesel, 29,000 bhp. One shaft
- Speed: 21 knots (52 km/h)
- Complement: 61 RFA; 150 RN
- Armament: 4 x 20 mm guns
- Aircraft carried: Up to five Westland Sea King

RFA Reliant (A131) was a helicopter support ship of the Royal Fleet Auxiliary. She was built in 1977 in Poland, at the Gdańsk Shipyard, as a conventional container ship with roll-on/roll-off capability for loading vehicles and containers for the Harrison Line. She was named Astronomer. She was taken up from the trade in 1982 for service in the Falklands War as an aircraft transport, being fitted with a temporary mid-ships flight deck and hangar forward to carry 13 helicopters.

At the conclusion of 1982, she was chartered by the United Kingdom's Ministry of Defence (MoD), leading to a more extensive conversion. She was equipped with the Arapaho containerized aircraft handling system, a hangar, and a flight deck, subsequently entering service with the Royal Fleet Auxiliary as RFA Reliant. Her first operational sortie was to the coast of Lebanon in support of the Multinational Force in Lebanon and the British Army units based in Beirut, eventually evacuating the same in February 1984. Upon returning to UK she proceeded to the Falklands for what was expected to be an extended deployment. However, it did not last long as the Arapaho system proved to be unsatisfactory for handling aircraft. She was decommissioned in 1986 and sold back into conventional merchant service.
