= RIM-174 Standard ERAM =

US surface-to-air missile

RIM-174 ERAM SM-6
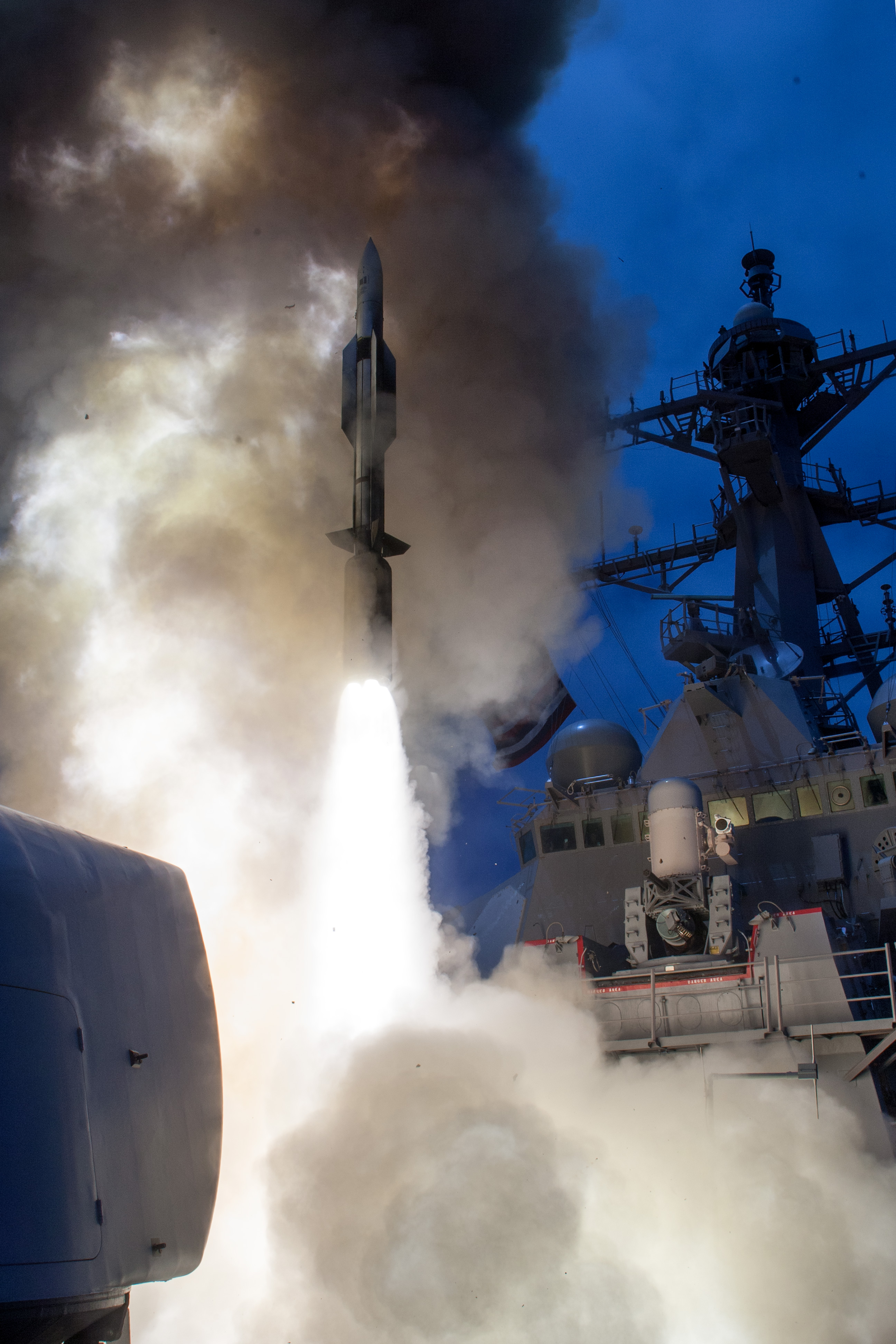
- USS John Paul Jones launches a RIM-174 in June 2014
- Type: Surface-to-air missile (primary role); Anti-ballistic missile (terminal phase); Anti-ship missile (secondary role)
- Place of origin: United States

Service history
- In service: 2013–present
- Used by: United States Navy; Royal Australian Navy; Japan Maritime Self Defense Force; Republic of Korea Navy

Production history
- Manufacturer: Raytheon
- Unit cost: US$4.87M (US$8,766.6M for 1800); US$4,318,632 (FY2021) (average)
- Produced: 2009–present
- No. built: 500 (1,800 planned)

Specifications
- Mass: 3,300 lb (1,500 kg)
- Length: 21.5 ft (6.6 m)
- Diameter: 13.5 in (0.34 m) for Block IA; 21 in (0.53 m) for Block IB
- Wingspan: 42.0 in (1.07 m)
- Warhead: 140 lb (64 kg) blast fragmentation
- Detonation mechanism: Radar and contact fuze
- Engine: Two stage: solid rocket booster, solid rocket booster/sustainer
- Operational range: 130 nmi (150 mi; 240 km) or upwards of 250 nmi (290 mi; 460 km) around 500 km against land targets
- Flight ceiling: >110,000 ft (34,000 m)
- Maximum speed: Mach 3.5 (2,664.2 mph; 4,287.7 km/h; 1.2 km/s)
- Guidance system: Inertial guidance, terminal active and Semi-active radar homing
- Launch platform: Mk 41 VLS (surface ship); Typhon missile system (ground launcher)

The RIM-174 Standard Extended Range Active Missile (ERAM), or Standard Missile 6 (SM-6), is a missile in current production for the United States Navy (USN) by RTX. It was designed for extended-range anti-air warfare (ER-AAW) purposes, providing capability against fixed and rotary-wing aircraft, unmanned aerial vehicles, anti-ship cruise missiles in flight, both over sea and land, and terminal ballistic missile defense. It can also be used as a high-speed anti-ship missile. The missile uses the airframe of the earlier SM-2ER Block IV (RIM-156A) missile, adding the active radar homing seeker from the AIM-120C AMRAAM in place of the semi‑active seeker of the previous design. This improves the capability of the Standard missile against highly agile targets and targets beyond the effective range of the launching vessels' target illumination radars. Initial operating capability was planned for 2013 and was achieved on 27 November 2013.

The SM-6 is not meant to replace the SM-2 series of missiles but serves alongside and provides extended range and increased firepower. It was approved for export in January 2017. An air-to-air variant of the SM-6, known as the AIM-174 Gunslinger, is the first dedicated long-range air-to-air missile employed by the USN since the 2004 retirement of the AIM-54 Phoenix. The SM-6 can also be fired from the U.S. Army's Typhon missile launcher as part of the Strategic Mid-range Fires System (SMRF).

== Description ==
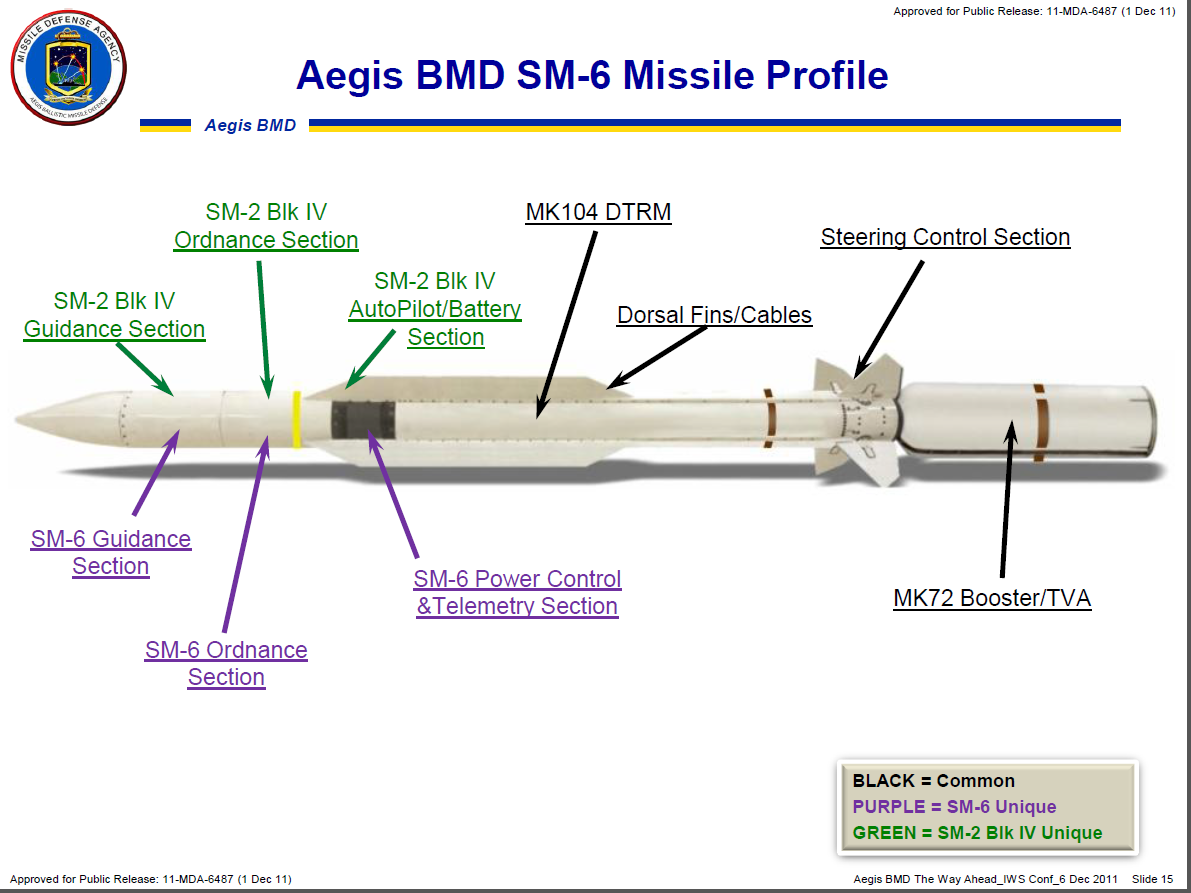
SM-6 Missile profile

The Standard ERAM is a two-stage missile with a booster stage and a second stage. It is similar in appearance to the RIM-156A Standard missile. The radar seeker is an enlarged version adapted from the AIM-120C AMRAAM seeker (13.5 in (34 cm) versus 7 in (18 cm)). The missile may be employed in a number of modes: inertially guided to target with terminal acquisition using active radar seeker, semi‑active radar homing all the way, or an over-the-horizon shot with Cooperative Engagement Capability (CEC). The missile is also capable of terminal ballistic missile defense as a supplement to the Standard Missile 3 (RIM-161).

The SM-6 offers extended range over previous SM-2 series missiles, primarily being able to intercept very high altitude or sea-skimming anti-ship missiles, and is also capable of performing terminal phase ballistic missile defense. The SM-6 can also function as a high-speed anti-ship missile. It can discriminate targets using its dual-mode seeker, with the semi‑active seeker relying on a ship-based illuminator to highlight the target and the active seeker having the missile itself send out an electromagnetic signal; the active seeker has the ability to detect a land-based cruise missile amid ground features, even from behind a mountain. The multi-mission SM-6 is engineered with the aerodynamics of an SM-2, the propulsion booster stack of the SM-3, and the front-end configuration of the AIM-120 AMRAAM. Estimates of the SM-6's range vary; its official published range is 130 nmi (150 mi; 240 km), but it could be anywhere from 200 nmi (230 mi; 370 km) to as much as 250 nmi (290 mi; 460 km).

The U.S. Navy is adding GPS guidance to the SM-6 Block IA so that it has the capability to strike surface targets if needed. However, given its higher cost than other land attack weapons like the Tomahawk cruise missile, it would not likely be used as a primary option. In February 2016, Secretary of Defense Ashton Carter confirmed that the SM-6 would be modified to act as an anti-ship weapon.

The SM-6 Block IB is currently in final stage development, with production expected to begin in late fiscal year 2024. The variant is to improve on the existing capabilities of the SM-6 series by incorporating a larger 53 cm (21-inch) diameter motor for greater range and speed. The Block IB variant is intended to achieve hypersonic speeds, making it highly effective against both aerial and surface targets.

The second increment of the SM-6 Sea Based Terminal is a modification to Raytheon’s missile quickly fielded to provide defense against hypersonic weapons in their terminal flight phase. It will serve as an interim solution until the Glide Phase Interceptor becomes available.

== History ==
Raytheon entered a contract in 2004 to develop the missile for the United States Navy after the cancellation of the Standard Missile 2 extended range block IVA (RIM-156B). Development started in 2005, followed by testing in 2007. The missile was officially designated RIM-174A in February 2008. Initial low rate production was authorized in 2009. Raytheon received a $93 million contract to begin production of the RIM-174A in September 2009. The first low-rate production missile was delivered in March 2011. SM-6 was approved for full-rate production in May 2013. On 27 November 2013, the Standard ERAM achieved Initial Operating Capability (IOC) when it was fielded on board USS Kidd.

During exercises from 18–20 June 2014, the Arleigh Burke-class destroyer USS John Paul Jones fired four SM-6s. One part of the exercise, designated NIFC-CA AS-02A, resulted in the then-longest surface-to-air engagement in naval history; the exact range of the intercept was not publicly released. On 14 August 2014, an SM-6 was test fired against a subsonic, low-altitude cruise missile target and successfully intercepted it over land. A key element of the test was to assess its ability to discern a slow-moving target among ground clutter. On 24 October 2014, Raytheon announced that two SM-6s intercepted anti-ship and cruise missile targets during "engage on remote" scenarios. A low-altitude, short-range supersonic GQM-163A and a low-altitude, medium-range subsonic BQM-74E were shot down by SM-6s fired from a guided-missile cruiser using targeting information provided by a guided-missile destroyer. Advanced warning and cueing from other ships allows the missile's over-the-horizon capability to be used to a greater extent, allowing a single ship to defend a much larger area. In May 2015, the SM-6 was moved from low-rate to full-rate production, significantly increasing production numbers and further reducing unit cost.

On 28 July 2015, the Navy tested the modified SM-6 Dual I version to successfully intercept a ballistic missile target in the terminal phase, the last few seconds before it would impact; the Dual I upgrade adds a more powerful processor that runs more sophisticated targeting software to hit a warhead descending from the upper atmosphere at extreme speed. This adds to the fleet's missile defense capabilities by allowing it to intercept ballistic missiles that could not be hit by SM-3 missiles, which target missiles in the midcourse phase. The Navy had used the SM-2 Block IV as a terminal ballistic interceptor, but the SM-6 combines missile defense with traditional cruise missile and aircraft interdiction in the same package. The SM-6 Dual I configuration is planned to enter service in 2016.

In January 2016, the SM-6 demonstrated both maximum down range and maximum cross-range intercepts in over-the-horizon, engage-on-remote missions supported by CEC, breaking the previous maximum engagement record it set in June 2014. Five targets were shot down in the test, proving the missile's capability to conduct multiple target scenarios. The SM-6 also sunk the decommissioned USS Reuben James in an 18 January 2016 demonstration, displaying its anti-ship capabilities. On 30 September 2016, Raytheon announced that the SM-6 had again achieved the longest surface-to-air intercept in naval history, breaking its previous long-range intercept record made in January 2016. On 14 December 2016, the Missile Defense Agency successfully launched two SM-6 Dual I missiles at a "complex, medium-range ballistic missile target", proving that its explosive—rather than hit-to-kill—warhead was capable of defeating medium-range ballistic missile threats; this ability may enable it to counter Chinese DF-21D and DF-26B anti-ship ballistic missile (ASBM) threats.

In August 2017, the Missile Defense Agency conducted another successful intercept test of a medium-range ballistic missile (MRBM). Two SM-6 Dual I missiles were launched from USS John Paul Jones to intercept a target MRBM launched from the Pacific Missile Range Facility during the terminal phase of its flight. The test marked the third successful intercept of a ballistic missile by the SM-6.

On 17 January 2018, the U.S. Navy approved plans to develop the SM-6 Block IB, which features a larger 21 in (53 cm) diameter rocket motor instead of the current 13.5 in (34 cm) motor. The new variant will significantly increase the missile's range and speed, enabling a hypersonic and extended-range anti-surface warfare capability.

In November 2020, the U.S. Army selected the SM-6 to fulfill its Mid-Range Capability (MRC) giving it a land-based long-range missile capable of striking ground targets. MRC was renamed the Strategic Mid-Range Fires in 2023. The Army plans to use the SM-6 alongside a ground-based Tomahawk cruise missile and field them by late 2023.

In April 2021, USS John Finn used an SM-6 to strike a simulated naval target 250 miles away. In the same month, a Super Hornet was photographed carrying what appeared to be an SM-6 while in flight.

On 27 May 2021, the Russian Navy ship Kareliya (SSV-535), a Vishnya-class auxiliary general intelligence (AGI) ship operating near Pacific Missile Range Facility, caused the delay of the Flight Test Aegis Weapon System. On 29 May 2021, Flight Test Aegis Weapon System 31 Event 1, a salvo of two SM-6 Dual II missiles failed to intercept two medium-range ballistic missiles; only one MRBM was intercepted.

On 30 March 2023, the U.S. Missile Defense Agency along with the U.S. Navy, successfully intercepted ballistic missile in its terminal phase with a quick salvo of two SM-6 Dual II missiles. This marked the third successful test of an Aegis BMD vessel using the SM-6 Dual II missile and the first intercept of a MRBM target using the SM-6 Dual II SWUP (Software Upgrade) missile.

On 19 March 2024, the U.S Missile Defense Agency, working with the U.S. Navy and Lockheed Martin, successfully conducted an intercept of an advanced MRBM test target using the SM-6 Dual II Software Upgrade (SWUP). Notably, the test was performed in conjunction with the USS Jack H. Lucas (DDG-125), the first Flight III Aegis Destroyer with SPY-6 radar. Australian Sensors helped play a role in data collection and communications, including the use of an E-7 Wedgetail aircraft and the ANZAC class HMAS Stuart. This was the fourth flight test of an Aegis Ballistic Missile Defense-configured vessel using the SM-6 Dual II missile and the second intercept of an MRBM target using the SM-6 Dual II SWUP missile.

In June 2024, the AIM-174B appeared on U.S. Navy F/A-18E/F Super Hornet fighter aircraft at the biennial RIMPAC exercise.

In July 2024, the U.S. Navy announced it had operationally deployed an air-launched variant of the RIM-174, designated AIM-174B Standard Missile 6 Air Launched Configuration.

In March 2025, the USS Pinckney participated in Flight Test Other-40 (FTX-40), codenamed Stellar Banshee, in which a virtualized SM-6 Block IAU interceptor was tested against a live multi-stage MRBM test target that utilized a new and previously untested type of hypersonic warhead, designated HTV-1. The threat missile was air-launched by parachute drop from a C-17 Globemaster III transport, and was successfully detected and tracked by Pickney, though no actual physical interceptor missile was fired. The test validated a variety of systems, including modern hypersonic missile tracking satellites, the Block IAU version of SM-6, and the ability of the Aegis Weapon System to track hypersonic targets, and a new type of hypersonic test target. The Missile Defense Agency subsequently announced that a future live intercept of an MRBM with HTV-1 would be designated as Flight Test Aegis Weapon System-43 (FTM-43).

On 8 April 2025, Anduril Industries announced that in the previous month, it had completed two successful live-fire tests of its 21-inch hypersonic rocket motor for the SM-6's second stage.

=== Combat ===
On 26 December 2023, the USS Laboon shot down three ASBMs in the Red Sea fired by Houthi rebels with multiple SM-6s. This was its first intercept of a ballistic missile in combat.

On 30 January 2024, the USS Carney shot down an ASBM in the Gulf of Aden fired by Houthi rebels with an SM-6. This was the first combat interception of a ballistic missile by the SM-6 publicly acknowledged by the DoD.

SM-6 was used by the US in combat in the 2026 Iran war.

== Variants ==
Designation	Block	Platform	Notes
RIM-174A	SM-6 Block I	Aegis combat system and Mk 41 VLS	Reached Initial Operational Capability (IOC) in 2013. Reached Full Operational Capability (FOC) in December 2017.: Ballistic missile defense capability; Anti-air warfare capability; Dual I
RIM-174B	SM-6 Block Ia	Aegis combat system and Mk 41 VLS, Land based Typhon missile launcher	Reached IOC in October 2019. Reached FOC in 1QFY2023: Ballistic missile defense capability; Anti-air warfare capability; Anti-surface warfare capability; Dual II
AIM-174B	Gunslinger (formerly SM-6 Air Launched Configuration)	Air-launched from F/A-18E/F Super Hornet	Tested by VX-31 in 2021. Tested by VX-9, VFA-2, and VFA-192 in 2024: Operational; Mk 72 booster removed
RIM-174C?	SM-6 Block Ib	Aegis combat system and Mk 41 VLS, Typhon Weapon System Strategic Mid Range Fires	IOC expected 1QFY2024: Anti-surface warfare capability

== Operators ==
=== Current ===
United States

- United States Navy
- United States Army - (Typhon missile launcher only)

Japan

- Japan Maritime Self-Defense Force

Australia

- Royal Australian Navy – focused towards ballistic missile defence.

=== Future ===
South Korea

- Republic of Korea Navy

Germany

- German Navy for use aboard F-127 Frigates

== See also ==
- RIM-66 Standard Medium Range
- RIM-67 Standard Extended Range
- RIM-161 Standard Missile 3
- Comparison of anti-ballistic missile systems
