= AWS Shopper =

1970s German automobile

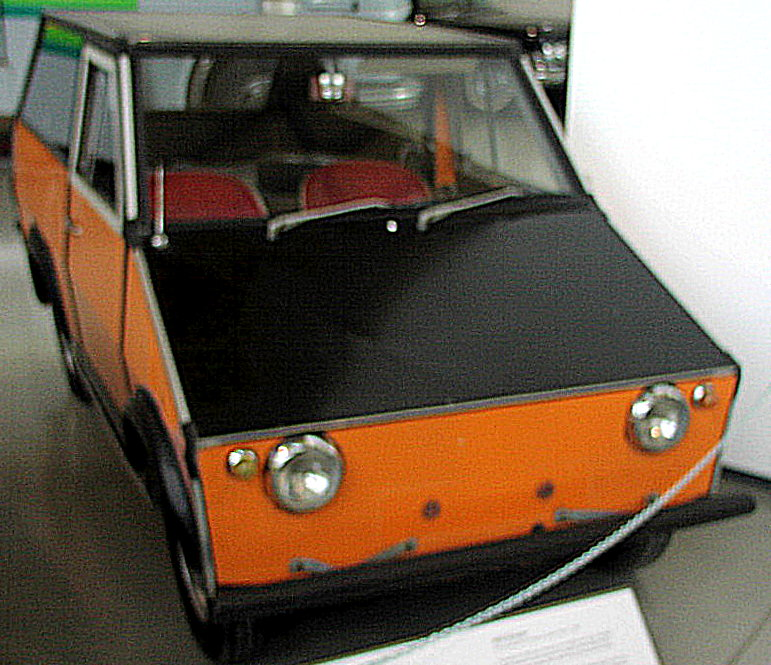
AWS Shopper 1973

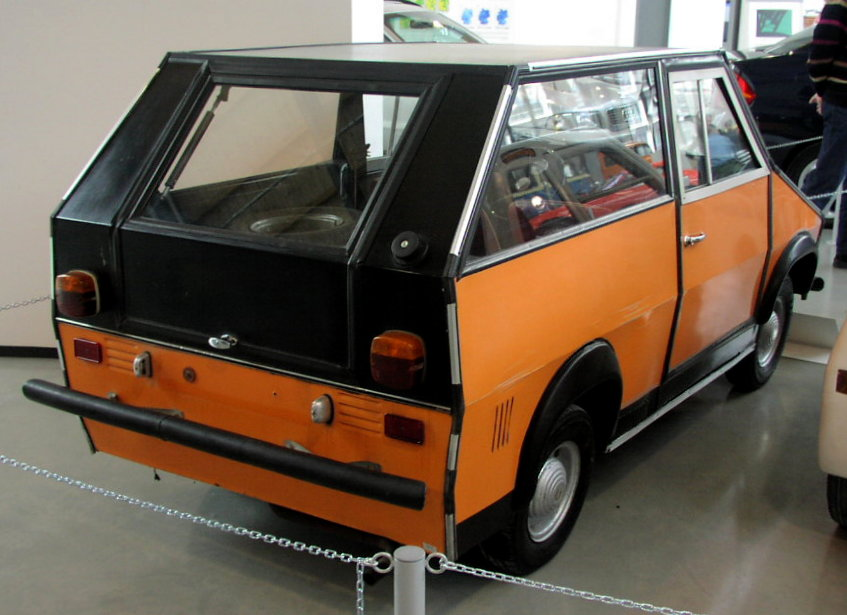
AWS Shopper rear view

The AWS Shopper (A.W.S = Automobilwerk Walter Schätzle) was a German Automobile manufactured in Berlin (Germany) from 1973 to 1974. The first car was shown in 1970 and a few hand-built cars were made, but series production began in 1973. 1700 were made.

== History ==
The AWS Shopper was designed by Walter Schätzle in 1970, an erstwhile Borgward dealer. The factory was located in West Berlin, in Rudow. The company first started to manufacture the car in 1973. While the brand's marketing was strong, the demand for this car was low during the 1970s. The company ceased manufacture in 1974.

== Design ==
The AWS Shopper's internal design was unique, the frame was made with square steel tubes connected by special angular brackets, and the shell of the car was made from plasticized sheet metal panels. This meant that fixing the car was simple. Goggomobil parts were also used.

Mechanical information:

- Model name: Shopper or Piccolo
- Years produced: 1971-1974
- Number of models produced: 1400 Shopper, 300 Piccolo
- Length: 3,070 mm (120.9 in)
- Width: 1,380 mm (54.3 in)
- Weight 430 kg (948 lb)
- Number of seats: 4
- Motor: Glas 2-stroke
- Cylinders: 2
- Displacement: 293 cc
- Horsepower: 15
- Gear box: 4 + rev
- Electrics: 12v
- Ignition: 2 x coil
- Chassis: platform
- Suspension (front & back): coil
- Steering: rack
- Brakes: hydraulic
- 4 Wheels: 480 x 10
- Top speed: 55 mph (89 km/h)

== See also ==
- Goggomobil
