= Affordable Weapon System =

United States Navy cruise missile system

The Affordable Weapon System is a US Navy program to design and produce a low cost "off the shelf" cruise missile launchable from a self-contained unit mounted in a standard shipping container.

The need for the US Army to mass-manufacture more affordable, low overhead weapons became a pressing matter during the 1970s, a decade when costs to operate and support an armed inventory grew rapidly and consequently reduced budgets for new weapons acquisitions. The US weapons inventory is the most advanced in the world, but its volume is deemed insufficient in a theoretical war against China for example (especially the long-range precision-guided weaponry). To that effect, BAE Systems had developed a kit (Advanced Precision Kill Weapon System) to convert Hydra rockets into smart, precision-guided ammo.

== Specifications ==
- Length: (w/o booster): 3.32 m (10 ft 11 in)
- Diameter: 34.3 cm (13.5 in)
- Weight: 394 kg (737 lb)
- Speed: 400 km/h (250 mph)
- Ceiling: 4570 m (15000 ft)
- Range: > 1560 km (840 nm)
- Propulsion: Solid rocket booster and SWB Turbines SWB-65 turbojet sustainer.
- Payload: 200 lbs.
- Guidance: GPS and in-flight datalink.

== Program status ==
- April 2002 - International Systems LLC of San Diego, Calif. (subsidiary of Titan Corp.) awarded a $25,657,312 cost-plus-fixed-fee contract for continuing development and implementation.
- June 2005 - Titan awarded a $32.4 million contract modification to produce approximately 85 missiles for demonstration, test and evaluation. The contract also includes work for the AWS launcher design and ship integration.
- September 2005 - Titan awards contract for launch systems to BAE Systems.
- 2007 - Duncan L. Hunter pushed a 30 million dollars budget in the yearly defense appropriations bill to continue the development of AWS, despite inconclusive 2006 tryouts.
- July 2008 - DOD Research, Development, Test, and Evaluation budget earmarks $15,200,000 for program.
- November 2008 - MBDA Incorporated is awarded a $4,530,231 contract for research into the best material approach and the completion of risk reduction tasks for the AWS.
