= ZSU-57-2 =

ZSU-57-2 (Ob'yekt 500)
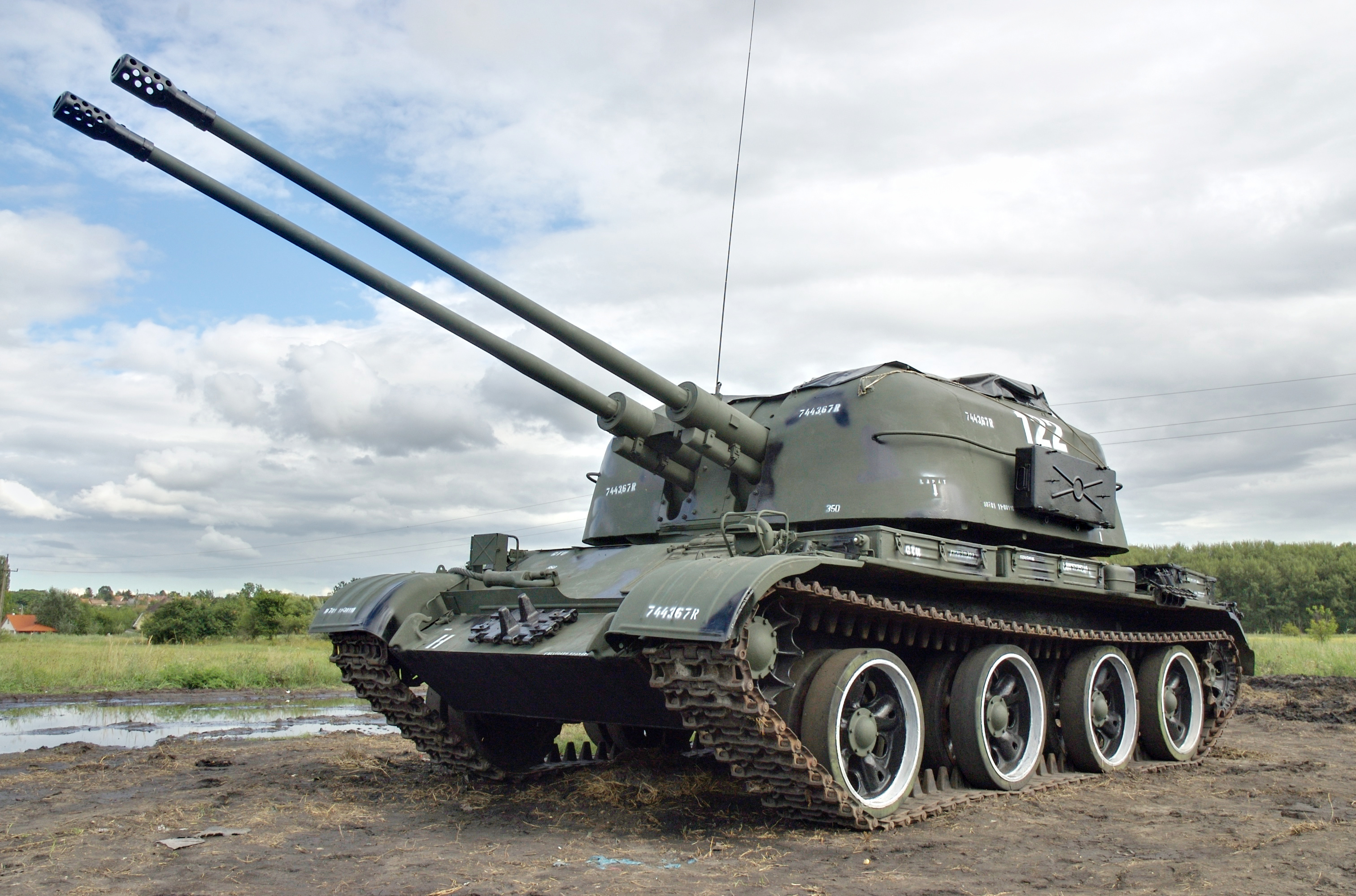
- Type: Self-propelled anti-aircraft gun
- Place of origin: Soviet Union

Service history
- In service: 1955–early 1970s (USSR); 1957–present (other countries)
- Used by: See Operators
- Wars: See Service history and Combat history

Production history
- Designer: Design Bureaus of Omsk Works No. 174 and Research Institute No. 58 in Kaliningrad, Moscow Oblast
- Designed: 1947–1954
- Manufacturer: Chelyabinsk Tractor Plant
- Produced: 1948–1955 (prototypes); 1957–1960 (serial production)
- No. built: More than 2,023 (USSR); 250 (North Korea, old turrets on new hulls) ? (PRC, Type 80)

Specifications
- Mass: 28.1 tonnes
- Length: 8.46 m with gun in forward position (6.22 m hull only)
- Width: 3.27 m
- Height: 2.71 m 2.75 m (with a tarpaulin top)
- Crew: 6 (commander, driver, gunner, sight adjuster, and two loaders)
- Armor: 8–15 mm
- Main armament: 2 × 57 mm L/76.6 S-60 anti-aircraft autocannons (57 mm S-68A variant) (300 rounds)
- Engine: V-54, 4-stroke, airless (mechanical)-injection, water-cooled 38.88 liter V12 diesel 520 hp (388 kW) at 2,000 rpm
- Power/weight: 18.5 hp/tonne (13.81 kW/tonne)
- Suspension: individual torsion bar with hydraulic shock absorbers on the first and last road wheels
- Ground clearance: 425 mm
- Fuel capacity: 830 L (including two externally mounted fuel tanks, 95 L each)
- Operational range: 420 km (261 miles) (road); 320 km (199 miles) (off-road)
- Maximum speed: 50 km/h (31 mph) (road); 30 km/h (off-road)

The ZSU-57-2 Ob'yekt 500 is a Soviet self-propelled anti-aircraft gun (SPAAG), armed with two 57 mm autocannons. 'ZSU' stands for Zenitnaya Samokhodnaya Ustanovka (Russian: Зенитная Самоходная Установка), meaning "anti-aircraft self-propelled mount", '57' stands for the bore of the armament in millimetres and '2' stands for the number of gun barrels. It was the first Soviet mass-produced tracked SPAAG after World War II. In the USSR, it had the unofficial nickname Sparka (Russian: Спарка), meaning "twin mount," referring to the twin autocannon with which the vehicle is armed.

== Development history ==
=== Origins ===
During World War II, ground-attack aircraft emerged as a significant threat to mechanized units on the move. Conventional towed anti-aircraft artillery (AAA), as well as vehicle Mounted smaller machine guns like the ones found on the ZiS-12 were an inadequate response under such conditions owing to the time needed to bring anti-aircraft machine guns into action. This experience made it clear that an anti-aircraft tracked vehicle, armed with small-bore autocannons or heavy machine guns, was needed. Vehicles such as the German Wirbelwind and specialized variants of the US M3 Half-track had been used to good effect in the final battles of World War II, both by the Germans, the US and nations which had received the M3 through Lend-Lease.

In 1942, Soviet engineers developed the T-60-3. The vehicle, based on the T-60 light tank chassis, was armed with two 12.7 mm DShK heavy machine guns; but the prototype did not go into production because of flaws in the design. The SU-72 SPAAG and several other experimental vehicles based on the T-60 or T-70 light tank chassis and armed with 37 mm autocannon were also tested in 1942–1943. The ZSU-37 was based on the chassis of the SU-76M self-propelled gun (SPG) and armed with one 37 mm 61K anti-aircraft autocannon in an open-top rotating armoured turret. The vehicle entered production in February 1945 and was in small-scale production until 1948.

After World War II it became clear that the firepower of a single 37 mm AA gun was insufficient to destroy the high-speed, low-altitude targets, which airplanes started to become at the time. SPAAGs based on light tank chassis had poor maneuverability in difficult terrain, slow off-road speed and insufficient range in comparison with medium tanks and SPGs. Thus the ZSU-37s were retired from service by the end of the 1940s.

=== ZSU-57-2 prototypes ===
For several years after World War II there were no new SPAAG models in the USSR except for the BTR-152A (which were armed with two or four 14.5mm KPV heavy machine guns, designated ZTPU-4) and the BTR-40A (ZTPU-2) wheeled SPAAGs. Two of the USSR's potential enemies – the United States and Great Britain, had high-quality air forces with substantial ground-attack experience. The need for a new tracked AA vehicle was apparent.

In February 1946, the Design Bureau of Works No. 174 in Omsk and the Research Institute No. 58 in Kaliningrad, Moscow Oblast submitted a joint project for a SPAAG based on the T-34 tank chassis, to be armed with four 37 mm AA guns, to the Technical Council of the Ministry of Transport. However, the project did not proceed due to the desire to concentrate attention on the newest tank chassis available.

The Design Bureau of Research Institute No. 58 (NII-58) (formerly known as the Central Artillery Design Bureau, TsAKB), under the supervision of V.G. Grabin, began the development of a twin 57 mm S-68 automatic anti-aircraft gun based on the 57mm S-60 in the spring of 1947. The first S-68 prototype (with ESP-76 diesel-electric drive), was ready in 1948. It was initially mounted on a S-79A four-wheel carriage; that system passed various tests but did not go into production.

The final project of the ZSU-57-2 (Ob'yekt 500), armed with twin S-68s and based on a light-weight T-54 tank chassis, was finished in 1948. The first prototype ZSU-57-2 was built in June 1950, the second in December 1950. After official tests, taking place between 27 January and 15 March 1951 in which the vehicle was driven for 1,500 km (932 miles) and 2,000 rounds were fired from its guns, six more prototypes were built for service tests. These prototypes had some improvements included, such as an increased ammunition load (300 rounds), but development stopped again due to the absence of improved S-68A guns. Various updates continued in 1952 and 1953. The service tests, in which two vehicles participated, took place in December 1954. This was due to delays in the development of drives for the S-68 guns. The ZSU-57-2 officially entered service in the Soviet Army on 14 February 1955. With the Warsaw Pact, all Russian allied countries were given a number of the ZSU-57-2.

== Description ==
=== Overview ===
Based on past experiences with SPAAG designs, Soviet engineers designed a vehicle that used a modified T-54 chassis, with four twin road wheels per side instead of five, and much thinner armour in order to not overwork the inbuild V-54 4-stroke diesel V12 engine of the T-54. The vehicle was armed with twin 57 mm S-68 autocannon in a new, large, rotating, open-topped turret. The ZSU-57-2 consists of three compartments: driver's in the front, fighting in the middle and engine-transmission at the rear. The hull is more spacious in comparison with the T-54 because of the thinner armour and has different locations for some equipment. The general layout, with transverse mounting of the engine, is the same.

=== Driver's compartment ===
The driver's compartment is located on the left hand side of the front of the hull. The driver's seat is moved forward and to the left in comparison with its location in the T-54. The compartment is equipped with a single-piece hatch cover opening to the left and two periscopic vision devices. One of them can be replaced by the TVN-1 infrared vision device which is operated together with the infrared headlamp (active night vision), which is mounted on the right track board. A fire-fighting equipment signal panel and a spare parts case are also located in the driver's compartment.

=== Turret ===
The open-topped box-type welded turret has a ball-bearing race ring 1850 mm in diameter. The turret rear can be removed, which makes replacement of the guns easier. The turret can be covered in the travelling position by a tarpaulin which has 16 plexiglass windows.

To aim the guns, base data such as the target's speed, direction and range must be entered into the sighting system by the sight adjuster, who sits to the left of the guns at the rear of the turret. The target's speed and direction is determined by visual estimation, while range can also be estimated visually or with the rangefinder. The upper front of the turret has two small ports with armoured covers meant for collimators of the sight.

To fire the guns, the breeches must first be opened. The left and right loaders, located in the forward part of the turret on both sides of the main armament, load clips into the magazines of their respective weapons. The loaders' travel seats should be stowed in clamps on the turret sides before opening fire. The gunner, seated on the left hand side in the middle of the turret, aims ("lays") the gun and opens fire using an electric trigger, which fires both barrels, or two-foot pedals, which can fire either barrel independently. If manual mechanical backup gunlaying is used instead of electro-hydraulic drive, three crew members instead of two should work with the sight. The commander, who sits on the right hand side in the middle of the turret, lays the gun in azimuth, the gunner in elevation and the sight adjuster enters data into the sight. The loaders feed clips into the twin autocannon manually as needed, similar to the Bofors 40mm.

=== Armament ===
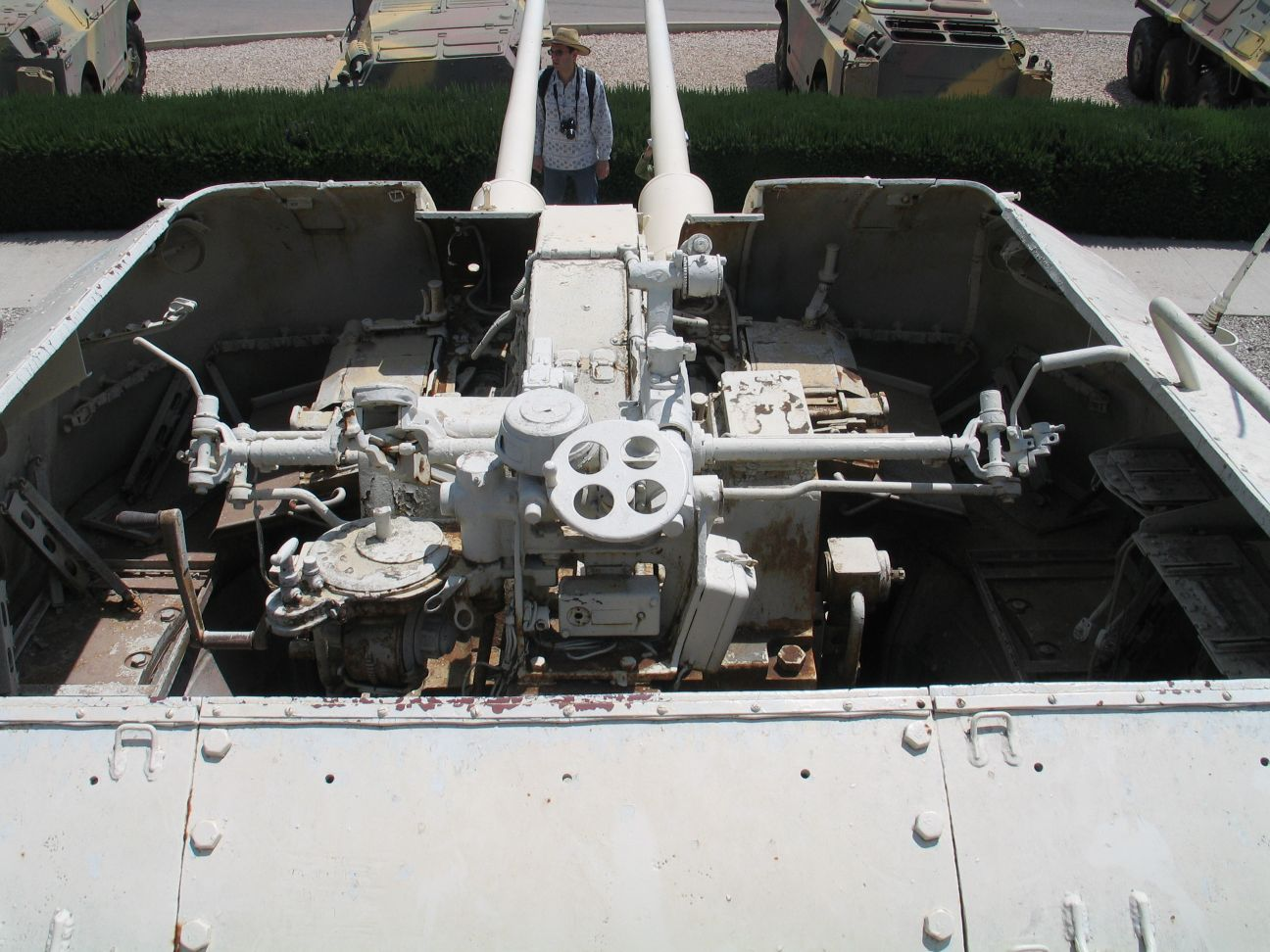
Detailed view of the twin S-68 guns of a Syrian or Egyptian ZSU-57-2 SPAAG which was captured by the Israeli army. (Picture taken at the Yad la-Shiryon Museum, Israel, 3 May 2006).

The twin S-68s are recoil-operated and weigh 4,500 kg. Their construction was based on two 57 mm S-60 AA autocannons. The guns have a recoil of between 325 and 370 mm. The individual weapons cannot be swapped from one side to the other as they are mirror images. Each air-cooled gun barrel is 4365 mm long (76.6 calibers) and is fitted with a muzzle brake. They can be elevated or depressed between −5° and +85° at a speed of between 0.3° and 20° per second, the turret can traverse 360° at a speed of between 0.2° and 36° per second. Drive is from a direct current electric motor and universal hydraulic speed gears (a manual mechanical drive is also provided in case of electrohydraulic failure; with the use of mechanical drive, elevation speed is 4.5° per second and the turret traverse speed is 4° per second).

The guns firing together are capable of firing up to 210–240 fragmentation and armour-piercing tracer (AP-T) shells per minute, with a practical rate of fire of between 100 and 140 rounds per minute, which gives a fire time of 2–3 minutes before running out of ammo. Muzzle velocity is 1,000 m/s. Each clip has 4 rounds, each of which weighs 6.6 kg; the charge in each round consists of 1.2 kg of 11/7 nitrocellulose powder, a projectile weighs 2.8 kg. Maximum horizontal range is 12 km / 7 miles (with an effective range against ground targets of up to 4 km / 2.5 miles. Maximum vertical range is 8.8 km / 28,871 ft with a maximum effective vertical range of 4.5 km / 14,750 ft). Fragmentation rounds have a safety-destructor which activates between 12 and 16 seconds after being fired to ensure the shells will not fall back to ground, so the maximum slant range of anti-aircraft fire is 6.5–7 km / 4-4.3 miles. BR-281 armour-piercing rounds are able to penetrate 110 mm armour at 500 m or 70 mm armour at 2,000 m (at 90° impact angle).

The S-68 autocannon was the most powerful AA gun installed on SPAAGs at that time. According to the statistical data of the Air Defence Research Institute No. 2, a direct hit of a single 57 mm shell could destroy a contemporary jet aircraft. In order to shoot down a jet bomber of the Canberra type, an average of 1.7 hits were deemed necessary.

The vehicle carries 300 rounds, and the ammunition is stowed as follows: 176 rounds in clips inside the turret, 72 rounds in clips in the hull front, and 52 separate (unclipped) rounds in special compartments under the turret floor. Armour-piercing rounds in clips are placed in the rear part of the turret to the left and right of the guns. Empty shell cases and clips are removed via a conveyor belt through a special port in the turret rear into an external metal wire basket on the back of the turret.

=== Armour protection ===
The ZSU-57-2's armour is welded rolled steel sufficient to protect the vehicle from 7.62mm armour-piercing bullets at 250 meters.

Armour thickness is as follows:

- Hull front: (upper) – 13.5 mm; (lower) – 15 mm; at 60 degrees upper
- Hull sides: (upper) – 15 mm; (lower) – 13.5 mm
- Hull rear: 8 – 10.6 mm at 45 degrees
- Hull roof: 15 mm
- Hull bottom: 13.5 mm
- Turret sides: 13.5 mm
- Gun mantlet: 15 mm
- Turret roof: open

=== Maneuverability ===
The ZSU-57-2 has a maximum road speed of 50 kilometres per hour (31 miles per hour), which is reduced to around 30 km/h off-road(19 mph). The vehicle has better acceleration compared with the T-54 because of its better power-to-weight ratio (18.6 hp per tonne). It has an operational range of 420 km(261 miles) on roads and 320 km(199 miles) across country. The vehicle can cross 0.8 m high vertical obstacles, 2.7 m wide trenches, ford 1.4 m deep water obstacles and climb 30° gradients.

The ZSU-57-2 uses the same engine as the T-54. It is a water-cooled V-54 4-stroke diesel V12 engine with a displacement of 38.88 litres, which develops 520 hp (388 kW) at 2,000 rpm. The engine itself weighs 895 kg. Fuel capacity is 830 litres carried in three fuel tanks inside the hull (640 L total) and two external fuel tanks on the right fender each of 95 L; fuel capacity was increased in comparison with the T-54. External rear-mounted supplemental fuel tanks can increase the road range to 595 km (370 miles).

The mechanical transmission in the rear part of the hull consists of a change gear quadrant, a primary multiplate clutch unit with metallic friction pads, a manual gearbox with five forward gears, two multiplate planetary steering clutches with band brakes and two in-line final drive groups.

The chassis has four twin rubber-tyred road wheels with individual torsion bar suspension, a rear drive sprocket with detachable sprocket rings (lantern-wheel gear) and an idler wheel on each side. The first and last road wheels each have a hydraulic rotary shock absorber. The track is 12.33 m long, 580 mm wide and has 90 links; despite having four road wheels instead of five the ground contact area of the track is the same as the T-54 (3.84 m). Track center distance is 2.64 m The vehicle has a ground pressure of 0.63 kg/cm^{2}.

=== Other equipment ===
The ZSU-57-2's electrical power unit partially differs from the T-54, in that it consists of a more powerful G-74 direct current generator which develops 3 kW (108 A at 27–29 V) at 2100 rpm and six 24 volt 6-STEN-140M or 6-MST-140 accumulator batteries (total battery capacity is 420 A-h), the batteries are used for starting the engine and an electrical power supply when the generator is shut down.

The ZSU-57-2 is equipped with an automatic anti-aircraft sight of the plotter type with two collimators which can supervise a target with a speed of up to 350 m/s, a dive angle of between 0° and 90° and a slant range of up to 5,500 m; a simple mechanical sight is provided in case of failure. There is also an optical sight for direct fire at ground targets.

The 10RT-26E portable radio transceiver is located on the right hand side of the turret interior. It has a range of 9–20 km(5–12 miles) when the vehicle is stationary, and from 7–15 km(4–9 miles) when the vehicle is on the move. It was later replaced by R-113 or R-113 radio transceivers. The TPU-4-47 intercom system was later replaced by R-120 or R-124 intercom systems.

Small arms for the crew members include two AK-47 assault rifles and a 26 mm signalling pistol.

=== Weaknesses ===
The main weakness of the ZSU-57-2 was the lack of a search or fire-control radar; the vehicle was equipped with an optical mechanical computing (analog) reflex sight as the sole fire control system, so it could engage visible targets only. Night firing was also impractical. Also, the manual gunlaying and manual clip loading was not good enough, the rate of fire is not high enough, particularly considering that air-cooled barrels require quite long pauses for cooling at high rates of fire and the turret traverse is not fast enough to effectively intercept high-speed attack jet aircraft at low altitudes. The vehicle cannot perform aimed fire on the move.

Although the ZSU-57-2 had the highest firepower among production SPAAGs of its time, the anti-aircraft fire efficiency of a battery of four vehicles was even lower than that of a battery of six towed 57 mm S-60 anti-aircraft guns controlled by the PUAZO-6 anti-aircraft artillery director with the SON-9 fire control radar or later by the RPK-1 Vaza radar. It became obvious that the hit probability on a jet aircraft of the era was very low using only determination of target speed by aircraft type and determination of distance to the target by eye or by rangefinder; the ZSU-57-2 was designed to defend tank units against NATO attack aircraft flying at subsonic speeds, but it entered service ten years too late. Aircraft technology had improved to the point that a SPAAG required a much higher rate of fire, turret traverse speeds of 50–100° per second and a fully automatic radar-controlled fire control system. Works No. 174 started a modernization programme for the ZSU-57-2 in parallel with the beginning of its serial production in 1957, but this programme was rejected due to the development of new radar-guided SPAAGs armed with small-bore autocannons and another tracked chassis.

The ZSU-57-2 still retained some of the features of its predecessor, the ZSU-37. One of them was the lack of an armoured roof on the turret. The advantages of an open turret for SPAAGs, such as very high elevation angle for AA autocannons, excellent visibility of the combat situation by the gunners and no need for induced ventilation of the fighting compartment during intense fire, were significantly over-shadowed by the disadvantages. The open turret of the ZSU-57-2 made it vulnerable from above, and prevented operations under NBC conditions. This flaw was partially nullified in the modified Bosnian Serb ZSU-57-2s, which had improvised overhead armour protection.

Nevertheless, its Western counterparts that were operationally available in the 1950s, such as the US M19 Multiple Gun Motor Carriage (based on the M24 Chaffee light tank) and the M42 Duster SPAAGs (both armed with the famous 40 mm Bofors M2A1 twin AA gun), had similar problems and were armed with less powerful weapons. The M42 Duster was tested with a T50 radar system in 1956 though it was a failure (production of the ZSU-57-2 had not started at this point).

The Soviet Union would launch a program to replace the ZSU-57. The ZSU-37-2 and -23-4 were the products of the attempt, and the ZSU-23-4 Shilka would see widespread service in various countries.

== Production history ==
Although the vehicle entered service in 1955 and in the same year the No. 174 Works located in Omsk began producing the hulls and turrets, the first vehicles were completed in 1957 after the first 249 57 mm twin S-68 guns were produced by the Artillery Works No. 946 located in Krasnoyarsk. A total of 5,300 of these weapons were produced by the end of the 1950s. The hulls and turrets were produced by No. 174 Works where the final assembly also took place while the Krasnoyarsk Works, belonging to the Ministry of Heavy Engineering, participated in some production stages. The ZSU-57-2 remained in production until 1960 when the No. 174 Works stopped producing the hulls and turrets for ZSU-57-2. More than 2,023 ZSU-57-2s were produced in Soviet Union.

250 ZSU-57-2 SPAAGs based on the Chinese Type 59 (a copy of the Soviet T-54A) tank chassis were produced under license in North Korea. The turrets were bought from the USSR and delivered between 1968 and 1977. Since the production of the ZSU-57-2 turrets ended in 1960 the turrets that North Korea bought must have come from decommissioned Soviet ZSU-57-2s. The turrets were ordered in 1967.

== Service history ==
=== Former USSR ===
The ZSU-57-2 officially entered service with the Soviet Army in 1955. The first vehicles began replacing BTR-40A's and BTR-152A's in the anti-aircraft batteries of tank regiments in 1957. It was first shown publicly during the military parade in Moscow on 7 November 1958.

Initially, tank regiments had a single battery equipped with four SPAAGs, later increased to two batteries, each equipped with four SPAAGs. The vehicle was also used by some motor rifle regiments (which in the 1960s had one battery equipped with four SPAAGs or, more likely, with six 23 mm ZU-23 towed twin AA guns). The anti-aircraft performance of the ZSU-57-2, however, was quickly found to be unsatisfactory and, because of rapid air force development, the vehicle was deemed obsolete by the early 1960s.

ZSU-57-2s were gradually replaced by radar-guided ZSU-23-4 Shilkas from the beginning of 1965. Towards the end of the 1960s, a frequent configuration was one battery of an AA battalion in a tank regiment equipped with ZSU-23-4s and another battery equipped with ZSU-57-2s. Unpopular in the Soviet Army, the ZSU-57-2 was completely replaced by ZSU-23-4s by the early 1970s.

Most ZSU-57-2s were put into reserve storage while a few remained in service in tank training centres (as vehicles for driver training), until the end of the 1970s. Some were converted by army workshops into bulldozers. The last ZSU-57-2s were scrapped in the 1980s, while some dismantled vehicles were used as gunnery range targets. One is preserved in the Kubinka Tank Museum.

=== Foreign service ===
ZSU-57-2s were exported like other Soviet equipment. Five other Warsaw Pact members—Poland, East Germany, Hungary, Bulgaria and Romania—used it, as well as Cuba, Egypt, Iran, Iraq and Syria. North Vietnam and North Korea may have received theirs without payment.

==== East Germany ====
The first foreign operator of the ZSU-57-2 was East Germany as it received its first vehicles in September 1957. From 1957 to 1961 the National People's Army received 129 vehicles, eventually replacing them with ZSU-23-4s between 1967 and 1974. The ZSU-57-2 was completely gone from East German service by 1979. Some of the vehicles were converted into FAB 500U training vehicles for T-54 drivers and were passed on to the unified German state.

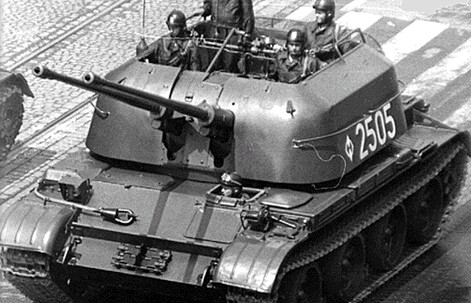
Polish ZSU-57-2 on a street.

==== Poland ====
Poland received its 129 ZSU-57-2s between 1957 and 1961. They were also offered a production license for twin S-68 AA autocannons, but declined it. Eventually, Poland replaced all its ZSU-57-2s with ZSU-23-4s. Seven Polish ZSU-57-2s are preserved, one at the Lubuskie Military Museum in Drzonów, one in Wicko Morskie, the largest anti-aircraft artillery firing range in Poland, one at the Land Forces Museum in Warsaw, one at the History and Tradition of Suvalkai Soldiers Museum in Suwalszczyzna, one in Koszalin and two at the Polish Army Museum in Warsaw.

==== Other Warsaw Pact countries ====
Three other Warsaw Pact members, Hungary, Bulgaria and Romania, received ZSU-57-2s once the ZSU-23-4 was introduced in the Soviet Army. Czechoslovakia imported one ZSU-57-2 for testing but it was rejected when it was realised that the domestically produced M53/59 Praga was comparable to the ZSU-57-2.

==== Former Yugoslavia ====
The Socialist Federal Republic of Yugoslavia ordered 100 ZSU-57-2s in 1963. Deliveries were completed between 1963 and 1964. They were passed on to the successor states during the 1992 breakup of the federal state. They were then used by the Federal Republic of Yugoslavia. There were 54 of those vehicles in service as of 1999, but this number decreased to 36 in the subsequent decade; they were withdrawn from active service by 2003. A number of ZSU-57-2 remained in Serbia national inventories until 2008. Two vehicles captured by Croatian forces during the Croatian War of Independence and were later also scrapped.

==== Slovenia ====
The air defence battery of the 44th "Wolves" armoured-mechanized battalion stationed in Pivka, belonging to the 4th Regional Command Postojna operated ZSU-57-2s. All vehicles were retired from service in late 90s.

==== Finland ====
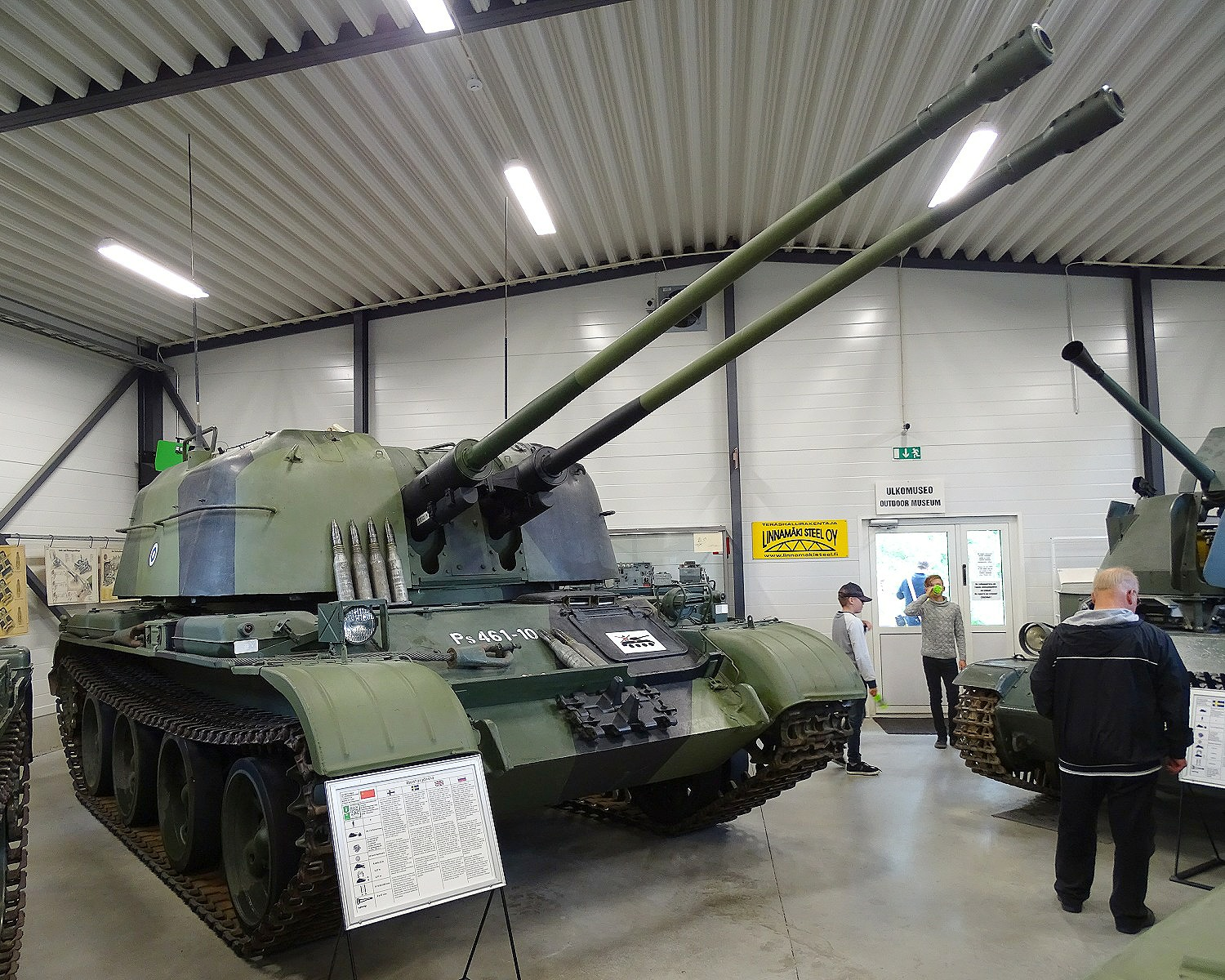
Finnish Army ItPsv SU-57-2 in Parola Tank Museum.

Finland imported 12 ZSU-57-2 SPAAGs between 1960 and 1961 alongside other kinds of Soviet equipment. The ZSU-57-2s were designated 57 ItPsv SU 57-2, some of them remained in service to the end of the century. A ZSU-57-2M modernization programme was being developed in Finland which would equip the vehicle with radar and configurable ammunition. However, after the prototype was produced the project was abandoned because of high costs. ItPsv SU-57s were withdrawn from service in 2006.

==== People's Republic of China ====
The People's Republic of China was approached by Iraq in the early 1980s to develop a copy of the ZSU-57-2 system and a few examples were delivered to the PRC for reverse-engineering. To meet Iraq's production order, NORINCO attempted to manufacture a copy with the improved amphibious chassis of the Type 69-II tank. The resulting vehicle was designated the Type 80 SPAAG. Several Type 80 SPAAGs were tested and accepted into service by the People's Liberation Army (PLA) in small numbers. It was originally intended for the export market but didn't sell well. Greater success was achieved by Chinese-made proximity fuses which could be used to modernize the S-60 and S-68 ammunition.

==== Middle East ====
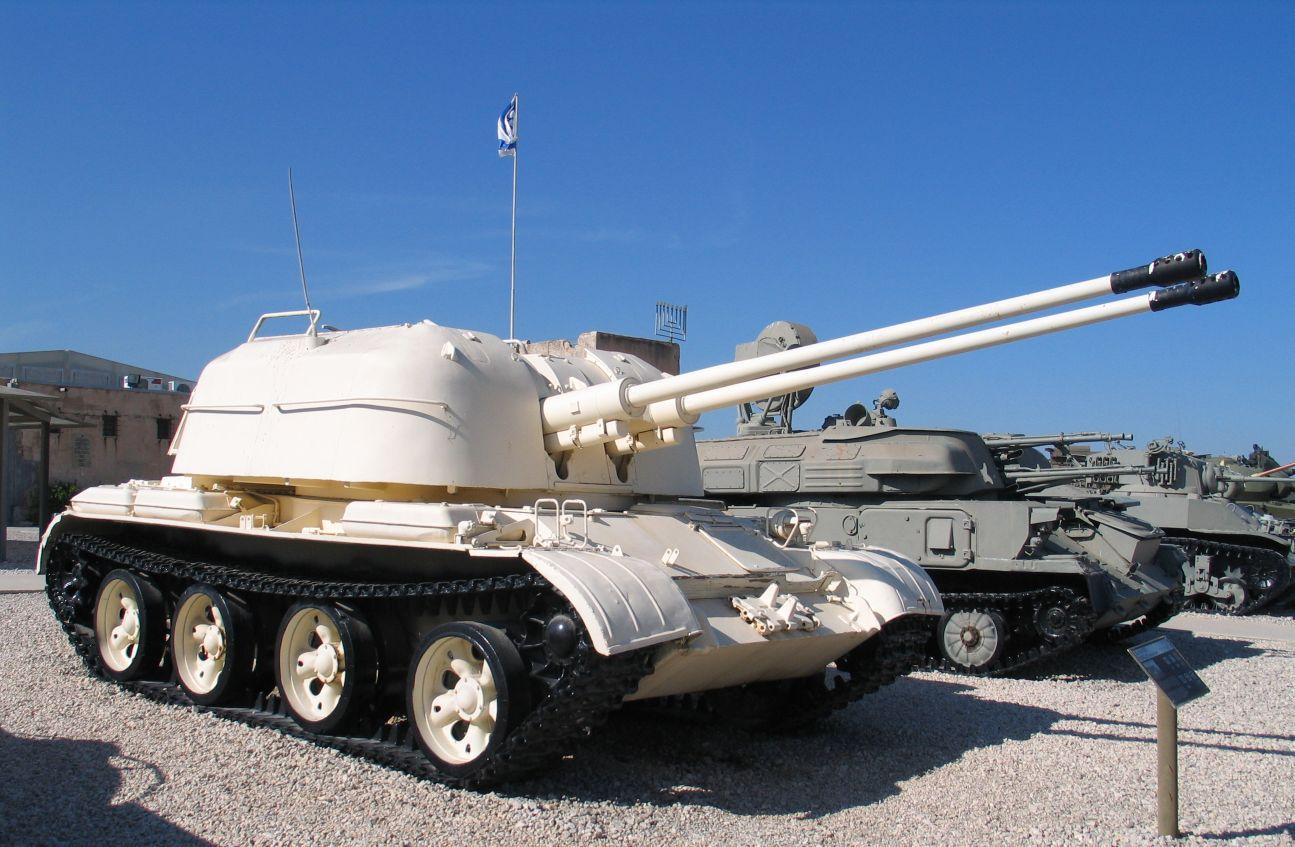
A Syrian or Egyptian ZSU-57-2 captured by the Israeli Army at the Yad la-Shiryon Museum in Latrun in 2005.

Iraq ordered 100 ZSU-57-2s in 1970 from Soviet Union, which were delivered between 1971 and 1973. The New Iraqi Army does not use these vehicles.

Iran ordered 100 ZSU-57-2s in 1966 from Soviet Union and they were delivered between 1967 and 1968. Around 90 remained in service until 2002.

Egypt ordered 100 ZSU-57-2s in 1960 from Soviet Union and they were delivered between 1961 and 1962. ZSU-57-2s were not very successful during either the Six-Day War in 1967 or the Yom Kippur War in 1973. Despite that, the Egyptian Army operated 40 ZSU-57-2s as of 2003 and equipped them with radars. Egypt also bought Chinese-made proximity fuzes for its S-60 and S-68 ammunition.

The Israelis captured a number of ZSU-57-2s from the Egyptians or Syrians. One resides at the Yad La-Shiryon armor museum in Latrun, West Bank, another at the Israel Defense Forces History Museum in Tel Aviv, and the third (captured in 1973) at the Israeli Air Force Museum in Hatzerim.

==== Cuba ====
Cuba received 25 ZSU-57-2s alongside other heavy equipment from Soviet forces stationed on the island in 1962 during the Cuban Missile Crisis. They remain in service.

== Combat use ==
While primarily an anti-aircraft weapon the ZSU-57-2 was also used in the role of ground support vehicle.

=== Vietnam War ===
The ZSU-57-2 first saw major use in the Vietnam War by the People's Army of Vietnam (PAVN), in the beginning of the Easter Offensive in 1972. It also saw action during the Ho Chi Minh Campaign in 1975. Several batteries of ZSU-57-2s were used for the air defence of the 201st and 202nd tank regiments during the Easter Offensive. ZSU-57-2s were used by the PAVN against US aircraft, but it proved to be more effective against ground targets. South Vietnam also used captured ZSU-57-2s. About 500 ZSU-57-2s survived the war. 200 are still in service.

=== Middle East ===
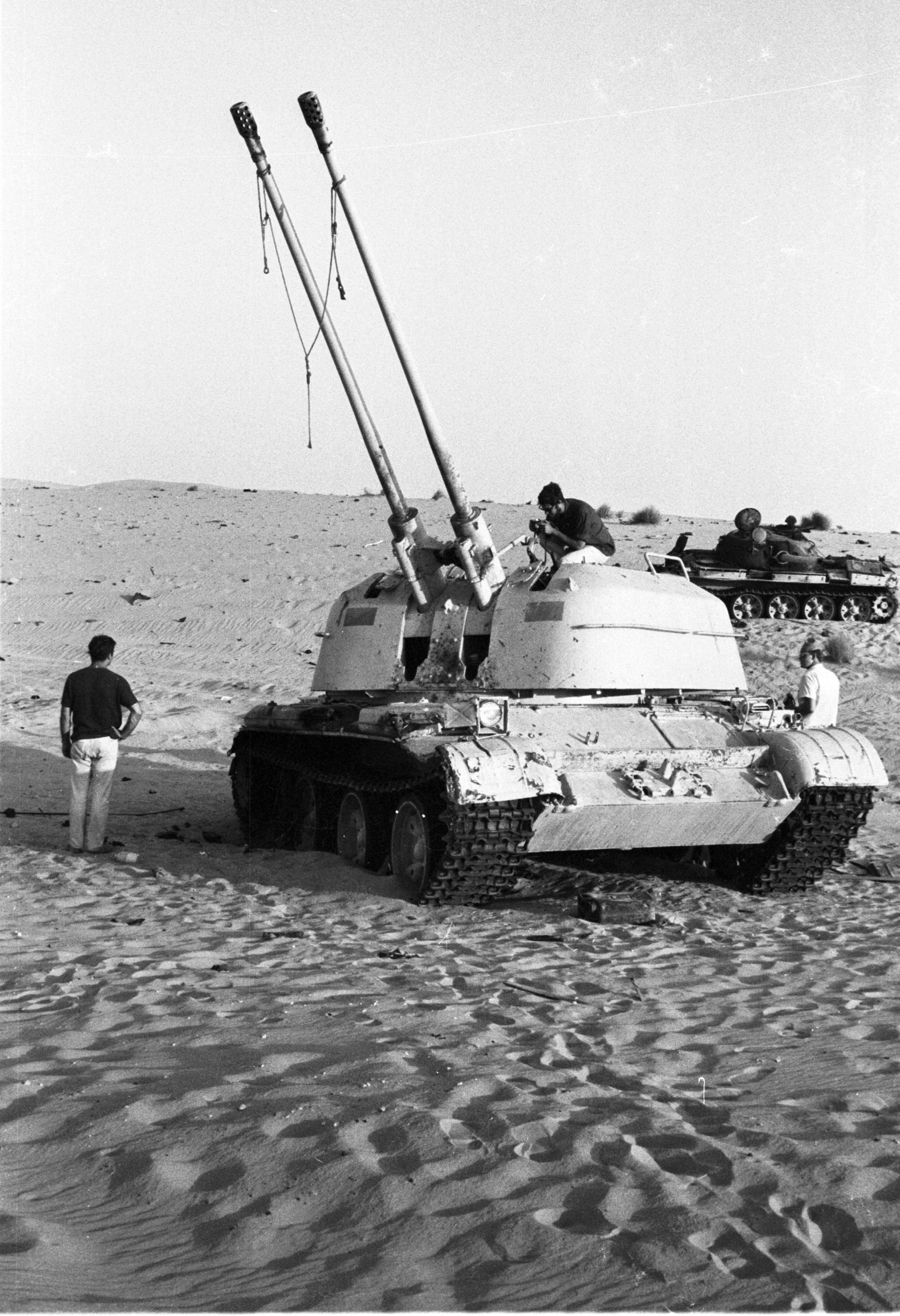
Egyptian ZSU-57-2 and other armoured vehicles lost in the Six-Day War in 1967.

ZSU-57-2s were used during several conflicts in the Middle East including the Six-Day War in 1967 and the Yom Kippur War in 1973, in both cases by Egypt and Syria. A battery of Egyptian ZSU-57-2s together with T-34s defended El-Arish airstrip. These were defeated by a company of Israeli M48 Patton MBTs belonging to the 7th Armored Brigade during an intense action on 6 June 1967. ZSU-57-2s were not generally successful and a number fell into Israeli hands. In 1976, during its intervention in Lebanon, Syria used ZSU-57-2s against the leftist militias. During the 1982 Lebanon War, they unsuccessfully engaged Israeli air force aircraft over the Beqaa Valley. However, the vehicles fared better when used against land targets.

During the Iran–Iraq War, ZSU-57-2s were used by both Iraq and Iran. Iraq also used Chinese Type 80s during this conflict and the First Persian Gulf War. Iraqi ZSU-57-2s, which could receive information from the radar on ZSU-23-4s or 9K31 Strela-1 (SA-9 Gaskin)/9K35 Strela-10 (SA-13 Gopher) surface-to-air missile systems were employed against Iranian AH-1J SeaCobra attack helicopters.

When the Syrian Civil War started, only 10 (out of 250) ZSU-57-2 were in active duty in the Syrian Army. During the war this vehicle was rarely seen and not documented in use. However, there is at least one piece of footage (which has since been removed by YouTube) showing that this vehicle was used by the Syrian Army in the Spring of 2014, in the fights at Harasta, Rif Dimashq Governorate. Due to the circumstances of the war being primarily land based, the vehicle was likely used primarily in ground support roles.

=== Yugoslavia ===
ZSU-57-2s saw service during the Yugoslav Wars, usually in light batteries used by Serbs and Montenegrins of the JNA for attacking ground targets. They were used during the war of independence when Croatian forces captured two ZSU-57-2s from the JNA. They were also used in the air defence role in 1999 during the NATO air raids against Yugoslavia when the Yugoslavs operated 54 of these vehicles.

== Combat history ==
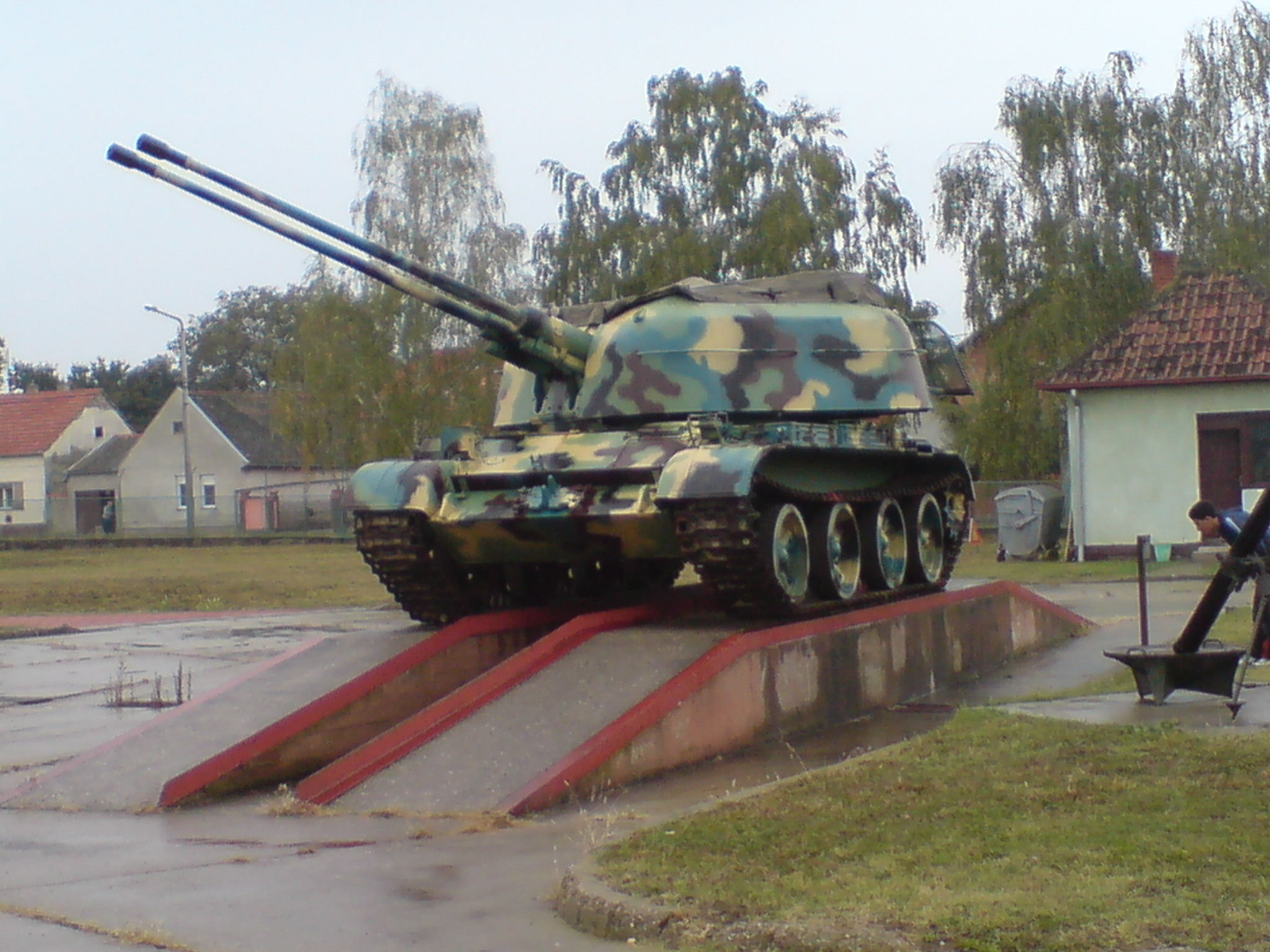
Croatian ZSU-57-2 in Vukovar war museum.

- 1959–75 Vietnam War (North Vietnam)
- 1967 Six-Day War (Egypt)
- 1973 Yom Kippur War (Egypt and Syria)
- 1975–2002 Angolan Civil War
- 1979 Sino-Vietnamese War (Vietnam)
- 1980–1988 Iran–Iraq War (Iran and Iraq)
- 1982 Lebanon War (Syria)
- 1990–91 First Persian Gulf War (Iraq)
- 1991–2001 Yugoslav wars
  - 1991 Ten-Day War
  - 1991–95 Croatian War of Independence
  - 1992–95 Bosnian War
  - 1995–96 NATO bombing of Republika Srpska
  - 1996–99 Kosovo War (FR Yugoslavia)
    - 1999 NATO bombing of the Federal Republic of Yugoslavia
- 2003 – Second Persian Gulf War
  - 2003 Invasion of Iraq (Iraq)
- 2011 Syrian Civil War (Syrian Government Forces)

== Variants ==
=== Former USSR ===
- ZSU-57-2 prototype was based on a modified T-54 tank chassis equipped with experimental tracks. Unlike the production ZSU-57-2, the prototype weighted 26.172 tonnes, carried only 252 rounds: 172 rounds in clips inside the turret and 80 separate rounds in the nose part of the hull in a special ammunition stowage, had thinner armour (8–10 mm) and antennae mounted at the rear of the turret upper right side instead of in the middle. The first vehicle was built in June 1950, the second in December 1950.
  - ZSU-57-2 improved prototype with an increased ammunition load of 300 rounds. Six were built between 1951 and 1953 for service tests.
    - ZSU-57-2 – SPAAG mass-produced between 1957 and 1960.
      - ZSU-57-2 armed with modernised twin S-68A autocannon. Like the original ZSU-57-2, it officially entered service with the Soviet Army in 1955.
      - ZSU-57-2 converted into a bulldozer. After ZSU-57-2 SPAAGs were removed from AA units at the beginning of the 1970s, army workshops converted a number into bulldozers. The turret was replaced by a steel closed superstructure. The vehicle was equipped with the BTS-55 bulldozer blade.

=== People's Republic of China ===
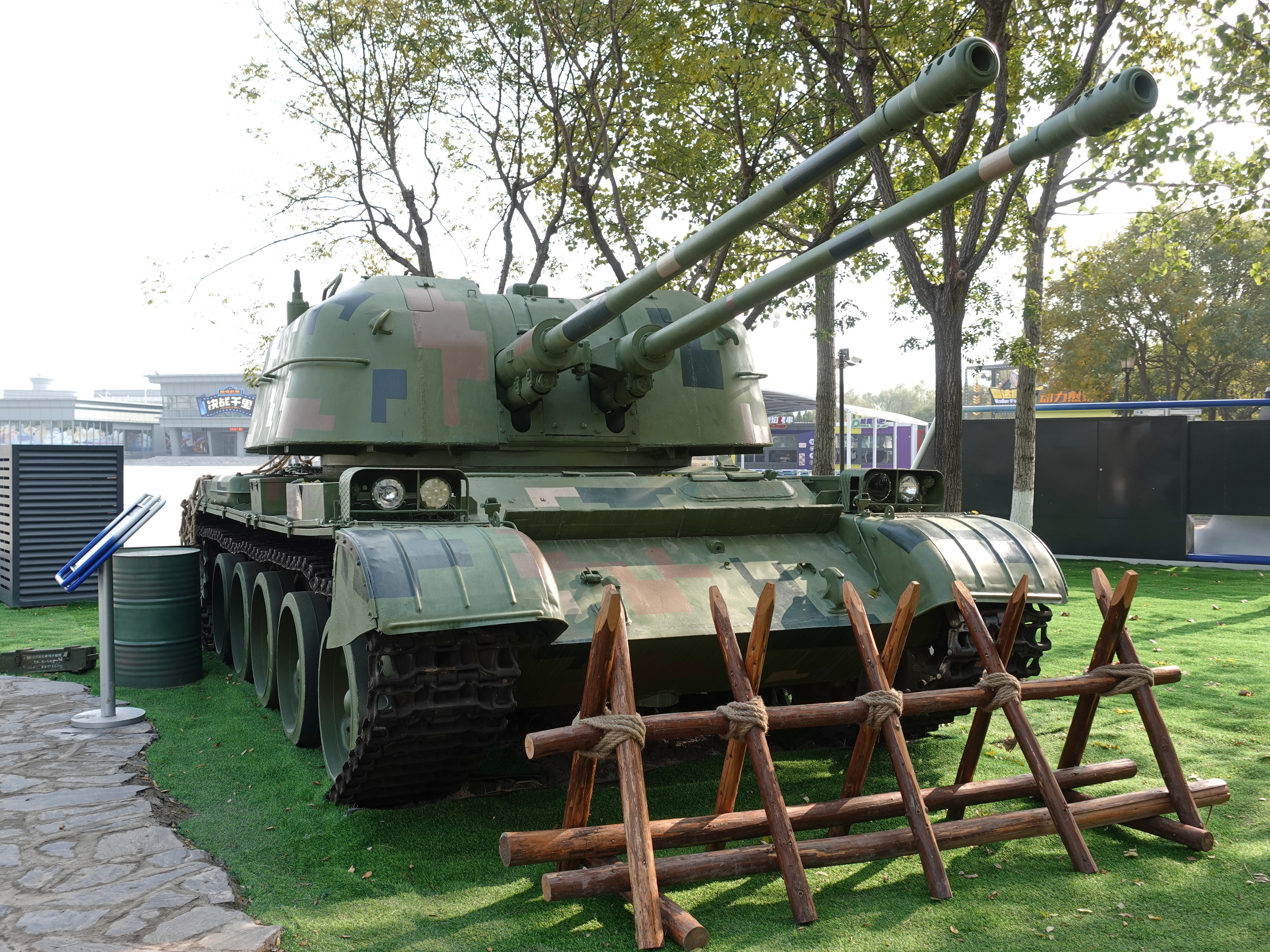
Chinese Type 80 at a museum display

- Type 80 (WZ305) – Chinese SPAAG. It has the same turret as the ZSU-57-2, but it is armed with the Type 59 twin anti-aircraft autocannon (a copy of the Soviet S-68), mounted on the chassis of a Chinese Type 69-II MBT. It is heavier than the ZSU-57-2 at 30 tonnes.

=== Cuba ===
- ZSU-57-2 with hanging flap type fronts to its track guards. Used by Cuba.

=== Egypt ===
- ZSU-57-2 modernization equipped with a radar.

=== Finland ===
- ItPsv SU-57 – Finnish designation for ZSU-57-2.
  - ItPsv SU-57 with a machine gun mounted on the front of the turret.
  - ZSU-57-2M – Finnish ZSU-57-2 modernization which equips the vehicle with radar and configurable ammunition. Only one prototype was produced and the project was abandoned because of high costs.

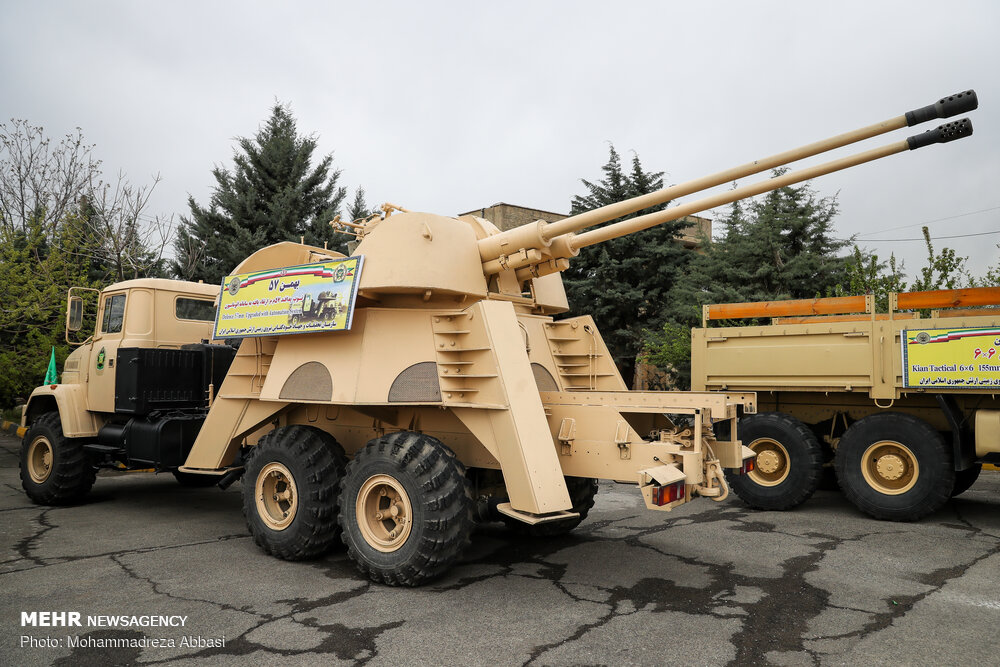
The Iranian Bahman system in 2019.

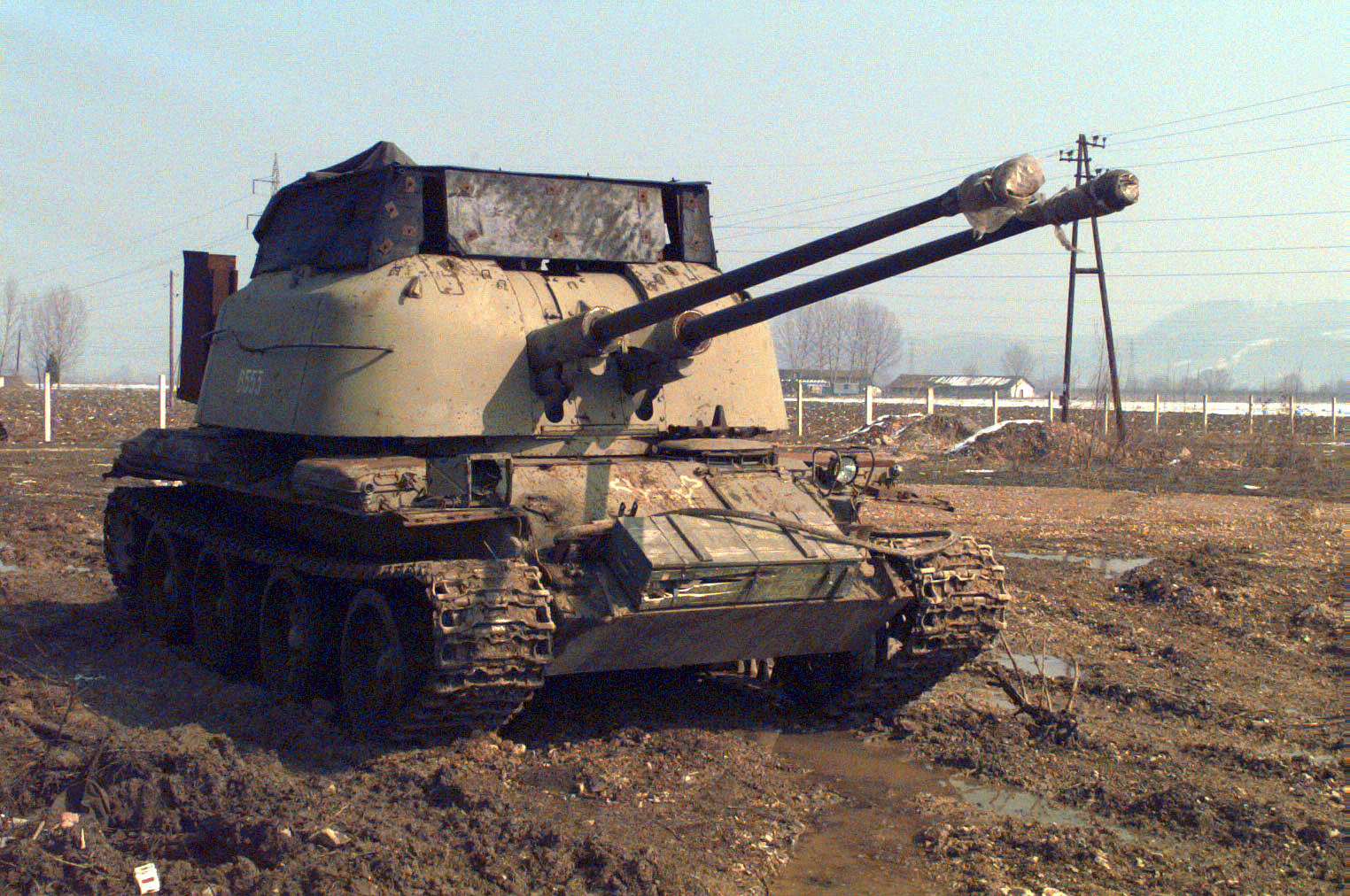
A modified Bosnian Serb ZSU-57-2 at a cantonment area in Zvornik, Republika Srpska, on 28 February 1996 during Operation Joint Endeavor

=== East Germany ===
- FAB 500U ("FAB" stands for Fahrausbildungspanzer) – ZSU-57-2 converted into a training vehicle for T-54 drivers.

=== Iran ===
- Bahman – Iranian truck-based SPAAG. Uses a modified version of the ZSU-57-2 turret with side armor removed and with upgraded gun.

=== North Korea ===
- Variant designation unknown; ZSU-57-2 turret mounted on the Chinese Type 59 (a copy of the T-54A) tank chassis, visually resembling the Type 80 mentioned above. Produced and operated by North Korea.

=== Republika Srpska ===
- ZSU-57-2 fitted with improvised overhead armour to protect the gun compartment from attacks from above, as well as rain and snow. It also has an ammunition crate fitted to the glacis plate which serves as additional passive armour. Used mainly as a self-propelled gun.

== Operators ==
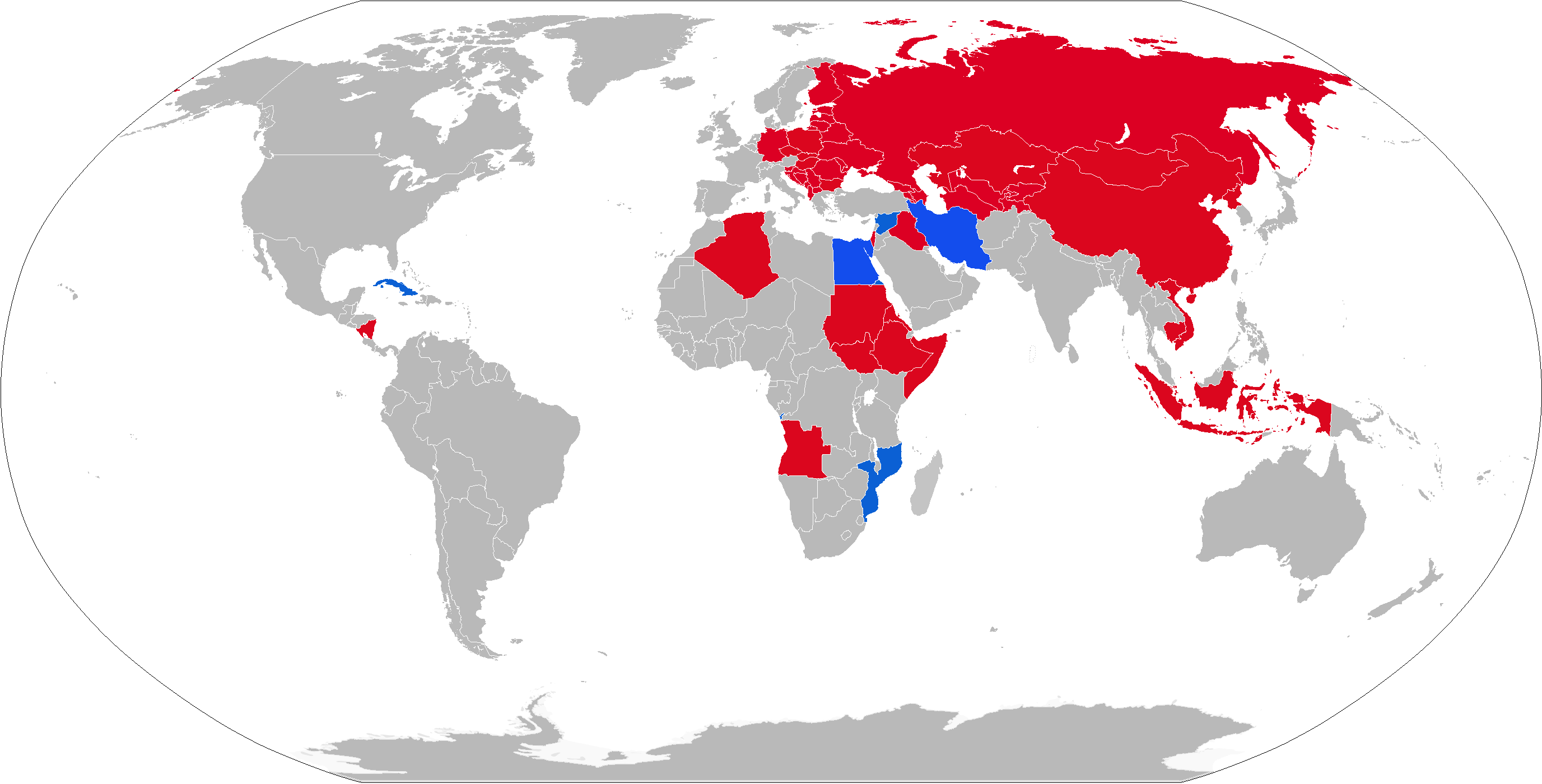
Map with ZSU-57-2 operators in blue with former operators in red

=== Current state operators ===
- Cuba – Received 25 ZSU-57-2s stationed on the island ordered in 1963 from Soviet Union (the vehicles were previously up to few years in Soviet service). Unknown amount still in service as of 2023.
- Egypt – 100 ordered in 1960 from Soviet Union and delivered between 1961 and 1962. 40 remain in service as of 2023.
- Pahlavi Iran / Iran – Received 100 former Soviet ZSU-57-2 between 1967 and 1968. 80 in service as of 2023.
- People's Republic of Mozambique / Mozambique - 24 1964–1970 Service, 1964 Vác City all 24 vehicles, and 1967-4 (6x4=24) vehicles in Tank Brigades (the vehicles were previously in Soviet service).
- Ba'athist Syria / Syria - 250 ordered in 1966 from Soviet Union and delivered between 1967 and 1973. 10 in service as of 2011. Unknown amount still in service as of 2023.

=== Non-state operators ===
- Hezbollah – Some provided by the Ba'athist Syrian Army and were employed in the Syrian Civil War, now used in Lebanon.

=== Former operators ===
- People's Republic of Angola / Angola – 40 ordered in 1975 from Soviet Union and delivered between 1975 and 1976 (the vehicles were previously in Soviet service). Operated at least until 2008.
- United Arab Republic / Federation of Arab Republics
- People's Republic of Bulgaria – 100 former Soviet vehicles received between 1965 and 1966. Withdrawn from service.
- Republic of Bosnia and Herzegovina / Bosnia and Herzegovina – 6 ZSU-57-2 in 2011.
- China – Received a few from Iraq for reverse-engineering. Operated Type 80 SPAAGs at least until 2011.
- Derg / People's Democratic Republic of Ethiopia / Transitional Government of Ethiopia – 10 former Soviet vehicles delivered in 1978. Unknown number in service prior to the end of the Ethiopian Civil War and Eritrean War of Independence.
- Finland – 12 ordered from Soviet Union in 1960 and delivered between 1960 and 1961. withdrawn from service in 2006.
- East Germany – 129 ordered in 1957 from Soviet Union and delivered between 1957 and 1961. Replaced by ZSU-23-4 "Shilka" SPAAGs between 1967 and 1974. It was completely removed from East German service in 1979. Some were converted into the FAB 500U driver training vehicle. They were passed on to the unified German state.
- Germany – FAB 500U taken from East Germany's Army. All were sold to other countries or scrapped.
- Hungarian People's Republic - 24 1964–1970 Service, 1964 Vác City all 24 vehicles, and 1967-4 (6x4=24) vehicles in Tank Brigades (the vehicles were previously in Soviet service).
- Ba'athist Iraq – 100 ZSU-57-2s ordered in 1970 from Soviet Union and they were delivered between 1971 and 1973 (the vehicles were previously up to few years in Soviet service). A few were given to the PRC for reverse-engineering. Iraq also operated a number of Chinese built Type 80s. All ZSU-57-2s and Type 80s were destroyed or scrapped prior to 2003.
- Democratic People's Republic of Korea – 250 ZSU-57-2 turrets ordered in 1967 and delivered between 1968 and 1977 (the turrets were previously mounted on Soviet ZSU-57-2s). They were fitted in North Korea onto Type 59 hulls. Remained in service until 1991.
- Pahlavi Iran – Received 100 former Soviet ZSU-57-2 between 1967 and 1968.
- People's Republic of Mozambique - 20 ordered in 1982 from Soviet Union and delivered between 1983 and 1984 (the vehicles were previously in Soviet service). They all remain in service as of 2023.
- Polish People's Republic – 129 ZSU-57-2s ordered in 1957 from Soviet Union and delivered between 1957 and 1961. Replaced by the ZSU-23-4 "Sziłka".
- Republika Srpska – 25 in 2002
- Socialist Republic of Romania / Romania – 60 ordered in 1965 from Soviet Union and delivered between 1965 and 1966 (the vehicles were previously in Soviet service). Phased out in the 1990s and replaced with Gepard SPAAGs.
- / Russia - According to the International Institute for Strategic Studies, the ZSU-57-2 remained in Russian inventories as far as 2004.
- Serbia - Listed in the national inventory by the IISS until 2008.
- Slovenia – Slovenia operated 12 ZSU-57-2 from 1991 until they were retired in early 2000s. Some were donated to museum's, but few may remain in storage. -
- Ba'athist Syria - 250 ordered in 1966 from Soviet Union and delivered between 1967 and 1973. 10 in service as of 2011. Unknown amount still in service as of 2023.
- Soviet Union – Replaced with the ZSU-23-4 "Shilka" at the beginning of the 1970s; training units used the ZSU-57-2 at least until the end of the 1970s.
- North Vietnam – 500 including 100 ordered in 1971 from Soviet Union and delivered between 1971 and 1972 (the vehicles were previously in Soviet service). Passed on to the successor state.
- South Vietnam – A number captured from the VPA.
- Vietnam – At peak there were 500 ZSU-57-2s in service with the Vietnamese army. Withdrawn from service.
- Yugoslavia / Federal Republic of Yugoslavia / Serbia and Montenegro – 100 delivered between 1963 and 1964.

=== Evaluation-only operators ===
- Czechoslovakia – Imported one ZSU-57-2 for testing but did not adopt it.

=== Captured operators ===
- Croatia - Captured several units during the Yugoslav wars and operated them during the rest of the wars.
- Israel – Captured a number of ZSU-57-2 SPAAGs from the Egyptians or the Syrians during the Six-Day War and operated them during the rest of the war.
- Kurdistan - Captured from the former Iraqi Army.

== See also ==
- Wirbelwind
- ZSU-37 – The predecessor of the ZSU-57-2
- ZSU-23-4 Shilka – The successor of the ZSU-57-2
- M42 Duster – Comparable US SPAAG
- Type 63 – a Chinese SPAAG similar to ZSU-57-2.
- Korkut
