= ZSU-23-4 Shilka =

ZSU-23-4 "Shilka"
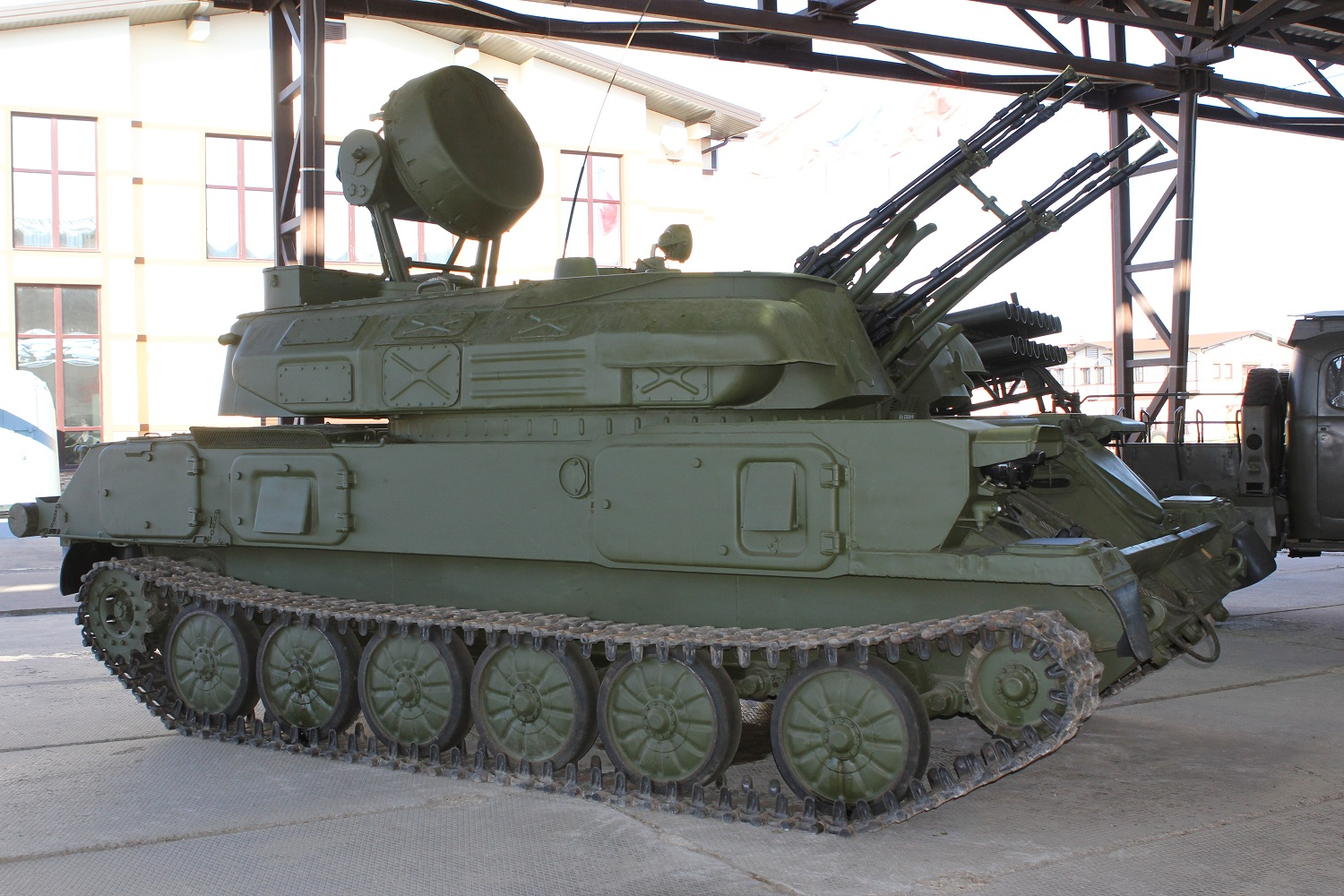
- A ZSU-23-4 on display at the Museum of Russian Military History
- Type: Self-propelled anti-aircraft gun
- Place of origin: Soviet Union

Service history
- In service: 1960–present
- Used by: See Operators
- Wars: See Combat history

Production history
- Designed: 1957–1960
- Manufacturer: Ulyanovsk Mechanical Plant (UMZ), Mytishchi Machine-Building Plant (MMZ)
- Unit cost: US$357,000 (export price to Libya, 1972/73)
- Produced: 1964–1982
- No. built: About 6,500

Specifications
- Mass: 19 tonnes
- Length: 6.535 m (21 ft 5.3 in)
- Width: 3.125 m (10 ft 3.0 in)
- Height: 2.576 m (8 ft 5.4 in); 3.572 m (11 ft 8.6 in) with radar elevated
- Crew: 4 (commander, driver, gunner, radar operator)
- Armor: Welded steel, 9.2 mm (0.36 in) turret, up to 15 mm hull
- Main armament: 4 × 23 mm 2A7 autocannons (AZP-23 "Amur" quad automatic anti-aircraft gun), ammunition 2,000 rounds
- Engine: V-6R, 6-cylinder 4-stroke airless-injection water-cooled 20-litre diesel 280 hp (209 kW) at 2,000 rpm
- Power/weight: 14.7 hp/tonne (11.0 kW/tonne)
- Suspension: Individual torsion bar
- Ground clearance: 375 mm (14.8 in)
- Fuel capacity: 515 L
- Operational range: 450 km (road), 300 km (off-road)
- Maximum speed: 50 km/h (31 mph) road 30 km/h (19 mph) off-road

The ZSU-23-4 "Shilka" is a lightly armoured Soviet self-propelled, radar-guided anti-aircraft weapon system (SPAAG). It was superseded by the 2K22 Tunguska (SA-19 Grison).

== Etymology ==
The acronym "ZSU" stands for Zenitnaya Samokhodnaya Ustanovka (Russian: Зенитная Самоходная Установка), meaning "anti-aircraft self-propelled system"; the "23" signifies the bore diameter in millimetres; the "4" signifies the number of gun barrels. It is named after the Shilka River in Russia. Afghan soldiers nicknamed it the "sewing machine" due to the sound of its cannons firing. It is also referred to by its nickname of "Zeus", derived from the Russian acronym.

== History ==
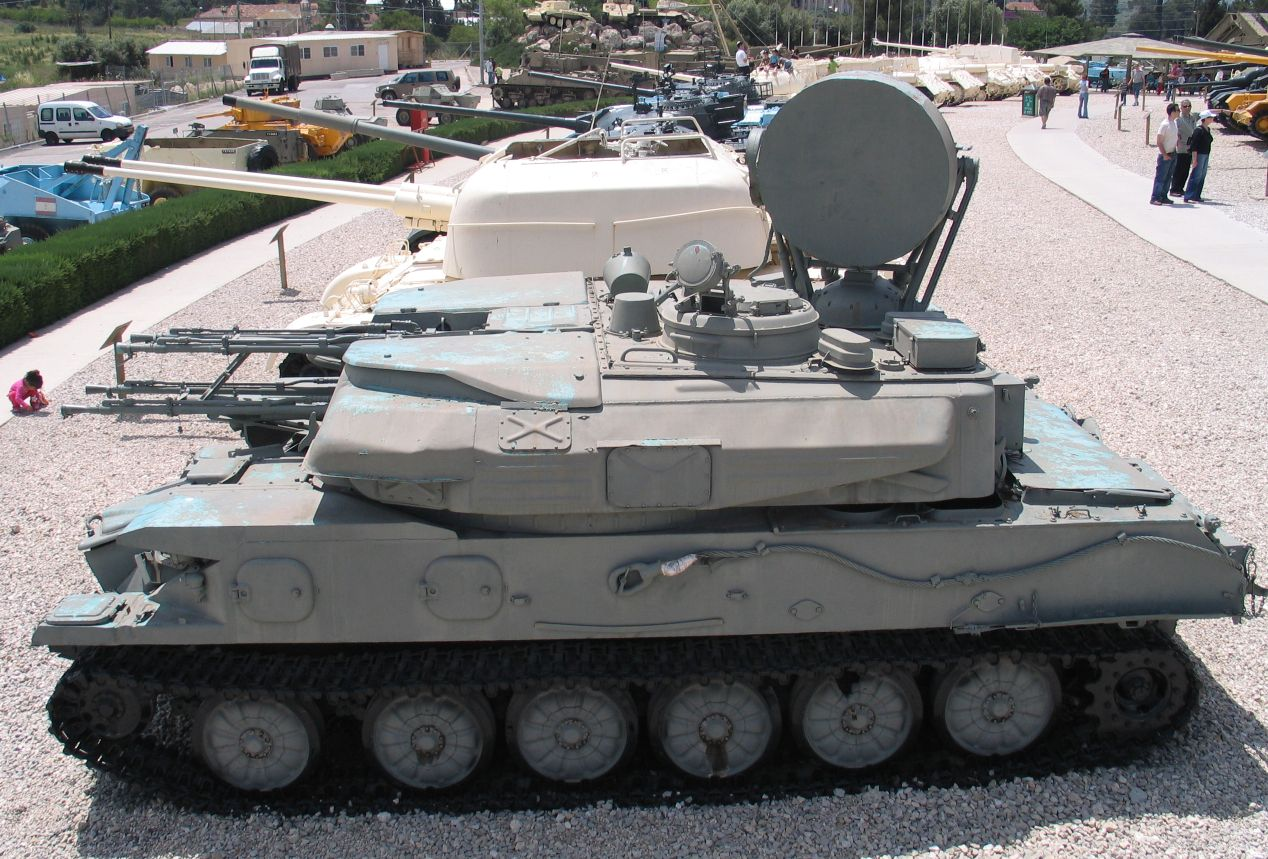
ZSU-23-4 at Yad la-Shiryon Museum, Israel

The previous Soviet self-propelled anti-aircraft gun (SPAAG), the ZSU-57-2, was armed with two 57 mm autocannons; it was aimed optically using a basic tracking and lead calculating system. The ZSU-57-2 was not particularly successful despite its very powerful autocannons; given their large caliber, it could only carry 300 rounds, was inaccurate as it lacked radar and could not fire while on the move.

The ZPU series armed with 14.5 mm heavy machine guns carried on a towed mount for stationary, point air defence had a much higher rate of fire. The 23 mm version of this weapon system was known as the ZU-23-2, a towed mount carrying two 23 mm cannons. However, these towed or improvised truck-mounted weapons had similar disadvantages.

The development of the ZSU-23-4 "Shilka" began in 1957 along with ZSU-37-2 "Yenisei" and the vehicle was brought into service in 1965, replacing all ZSU-57-2s in air defense units toward the beginning of the 1970s. The ZSU-23-4 was intended for AA defense of military facilities, troops, and mechanized columns on the march; originally, the more powerful guns of "Yenisei" were judged to be effective at covering the inner dead-zone of Soviet surface-to-air missile systems despite the increased weight of the vehicle, but commonality prevailed. Initially, tank regiments should have had the anti-aircraft artillery battalion of "Shilka" (consisting of two batteries, four ZSU-23-4s in each). At the end of the 1960s, one battery was equipped with ZSU-23-4s and the other with ZSU-57-2s. Motorized rifle and tank regiment standard anti-aircraft batteries consisted of two platoons later (one platoon was equipped with four ZSU-23-4s and another with four mobile surface-to-air missile systems 9K31 Strela-1 or 9K35 Strela-10). The ZSU-23-4 combined a proven radar system, the non-amphibious chassis based on GM-575 tracked vehicle, and four 23 mm autocannons. This delivered a highly effective combination of mobility with heavy firepower and considerable accuracy. The ZSU-23-4 outclassed all NATO anti-aircraft guns at the time, and it is still regarded as posing a major threat for low-flying fixed-wing aircraft and helicopters.

The system was widely fielded throughout the Warsaw Pact and among other pro-Soviet states. Around 2,500 ZSU-23-4s, of the total 6,500 produced, were exported to 23 countries. The Warsaw Pact's successor states continue to manufacture and supply variants of the ZSU-23-4, notably the Ukrainian "Donets" and Polish "Biala" variants.

ZSU-23-4 units saw active service in the Yom Kippur War (1973) and other Arab-Israeli conflicts, the Iran–Iraq War (1980–1988), and the First Gulf War (1990). During the Yom Kippur War, the system was particularly effective against the Israeli Air Force. Israeli pilots attempting to fly low in order to avoid SA-6 missiles were often shot down by ZSU-23-4s as in Operation Doogman 5. During the Soviet–Afghan War ZSU-23-4 units were used widely and to great effect against mujahideen positions in the mountains, the ZSU-23-4's guns being able to elevate much higher than the weapons on BMPs, BTRs, T-55s, or T-62s. They were also used to suppress defensive positions around the presidential palace during the initial coup in Kabul at the start of the Soviet-Afghan war. The Russian Army used the ZSU-23-4 for mountain combat in Chechnya.

== Description ==
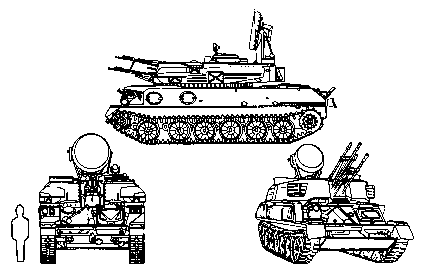
ZSU-23-4 graphic

The radar-guided ZSU-23-4 "Shilka" SPAAG, with its four 23 mm (0.90") autocannons, was a revolutionary SPAAG, proving to be an extremely effective weapon against enemy attack aircraft and helicopters under every weather and light condition. The ZSU-23-4 has a very high density, rate and accuracy of fire, as well as the capability for each of the four autocannons to fire its own type of projectile from separate belts. While it is technically possible that each cannon shoots different type of ammunition, there were two types commonly used in late 1970s: OFZT incendiary fragmentation and BZT armour-piercing tracer, which were to be loaded in 3:1 ratio—three OFZT, then one BZT, every 10th BZT round equipped with so-called "copper remover" and marked. Operators were strongly discouraged from shooting from a single barrel.

The appearance of the "Shilka" caused significant changes in NATO tactics in aircraft use at low altitude over the battlefield. Despite its present obsolescence as a modern short-range anti-aircraft weapon, the ZSU-23-4 is still deadly for enemy light armoured vehicles, infantry and firing points as an infantry-support vehicle. With its high rate of accurate fire, the ZSU-23-4 can even neutralize tanks by destroying their gun sights, radio antennas, or other vulnerable parts. ZSU-23-4s, especially late models, have excellent performance and good systems reliability.

Based on the GM-575 tracked vehicle chassis, which used components from the PT-76 light amphibious tank, the ZSU-23-4 mounts an armored turret holding four liquid-cooled 23 mm (0.9") 2A7 autocannons linked to an RPK-2 "Tobol" radar (NATO designator: "Gun Dish"). The vehicle weighs 19 tonnes (late modifications up to 21 tonnes), has a movement range of 450 km (280 mi) and a top speed of 50 km/h (31 mph). Additional firepower of late modifications can be supplied by a roof-mounted pod of six short-range SA-18 SAMs, or side-mounted SA-16s.

The crew numbers four: driver, commander, gunner and radar operator. The driver's compartment is located in the nose part of the vehicle. The fighting compartment is in the center, and the engine compartment is in the rear part of the vehicle.

The transmission consists of a multi-plate metal-contact main clutch, a manual gearbox with five forward gears, two planetary two-step steering gears with locking frictions and two final drive groups. The vehicle chassis has six single rubber tired road wheels, a rear drive sprocket with detachable sprocket rings (lantern-wheel gear) and one idler wheel per side. The first and fifth left, and sixth right road wheels have hydraulic shock absorbers. The track is 11.904 m long, 382 mm (15") wide and has 93 links.

Because of a large number of different pipes and tubes to detach during maintenance, the repair procedure for some of the vehicle's mechanisms is hard (for example, replacement or repair of a starter). The electric drive of an air outlet hatch of a gas turbine engine (part of the vehicle's electric power supply system) has an inconvenient location (at the bottom of the hull) which causes overheating and sometimes, jamming of the electric drive. On the other hand, the construction of the electric power supply system is very reliable. Changing the main engine oil and coolant is easy, as is replacement of fuel and oil filters, and sections of the air filter.

The ZSU-23-4 can cross vertical obstacles 0.7 m (2.3') high, trenches 2.5 m (8.2') wide, has a 1.0 m (3.3') fording depth and can climb 30° gradients. The ZSU-23-4 has good maneuverability and cross-country ability, but its diesel engine's power is insufficient for a vehicle of its weight. As a result, off-road acceleration capabilities are sub-par, and the vehicle lags behind MBTs and IFVs on up-hill terrain.

The ZSU-23-4 is equipped with an NBC system with an air filtration unit, fire-fighting equipment, TNA-2 navigational system, infrared vision device, R-123 radio set, R-124 intercom and electric power supply system consisting of a DG4M-1 single-shaft gas turbine engine (70 hp at 6,000 rpm) and a direct-current generator (which provides 27 V and 54 V direct current or 220 V 400 Hz alternating current).

== Weapons and fire control ==
=== Turret and guns ===
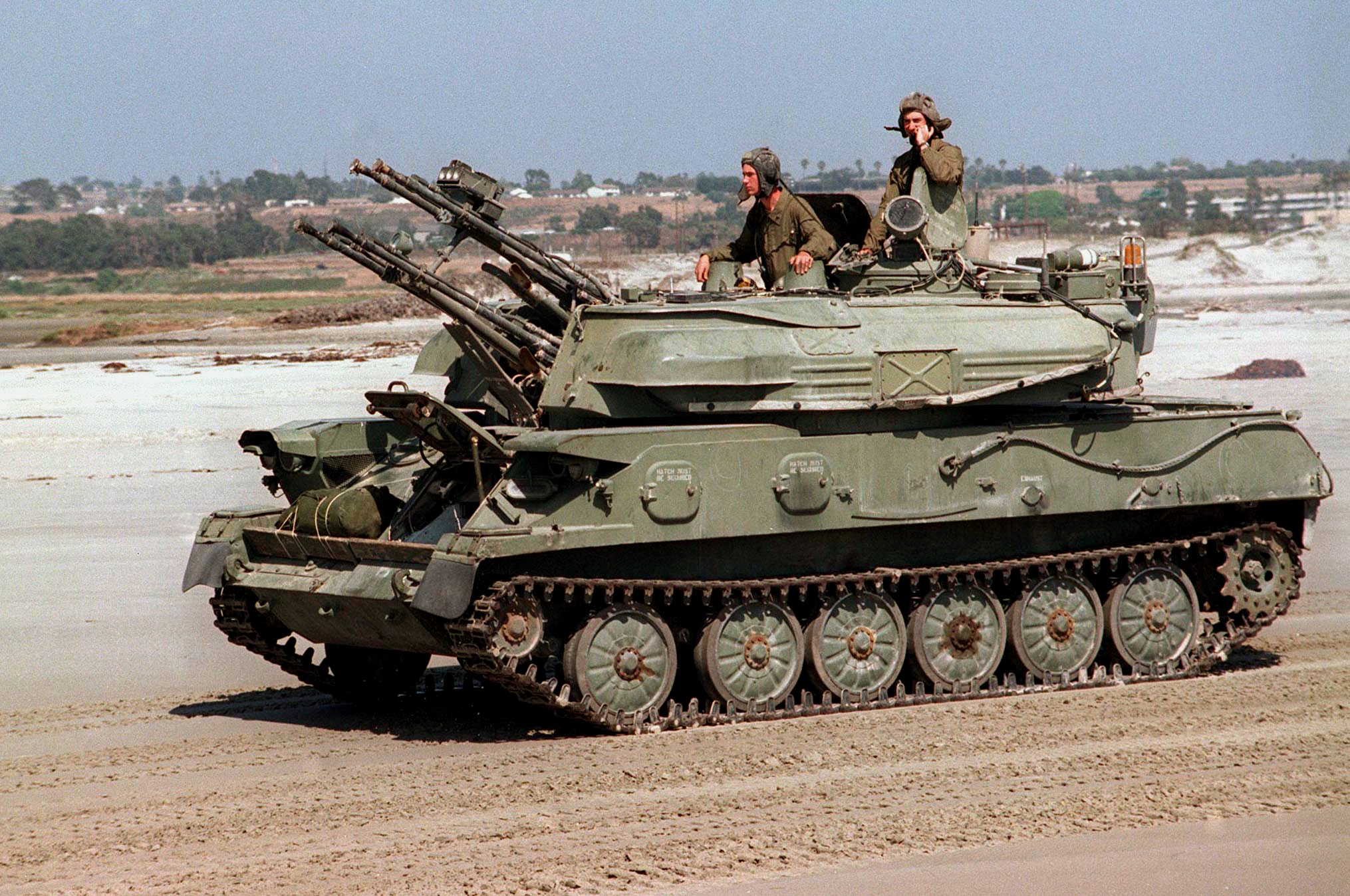
Side view of a US Marine Corps ZSU at Camp Pendleton, 1997

Each water-cooled 23 mm 2A7 autocannon has a cyclic rate of 850–1,000 rounds per minute for a combined rate of fire of 3,400–4,000 rounds per minute, which gives a continuous fire time of 30–35 seconds before running out of ammunition (not considering the constraints that limit the practical rate of fire, such as barrel overheating). The welded turret has a race ring transplanted from a T-54 medium tank with a 1,840 mm (6 ft 0 in) diameter. The 360° rotating turret is fully stabilised and capable of firing on the move. The turret rotation and autocannon elevation mechanisms provide very good speed and guidance accuracy. The hydraulically driven aiming mechanisms have been proven to be very reliable. Manual aim is used against ground targets. The quad automatic anti-aircraft gun AZP-23 "Amur" has a range of elevation from −4° to +85°. The GRAU designation for ZSU-23-4 turret with 23 mm (0.9") AZP-23 "Amur" quad automatic gun is 2A10. An armoured plate inside the turret protects crew members from fire and explosive gas during intense firing.

=== Ammunition ===
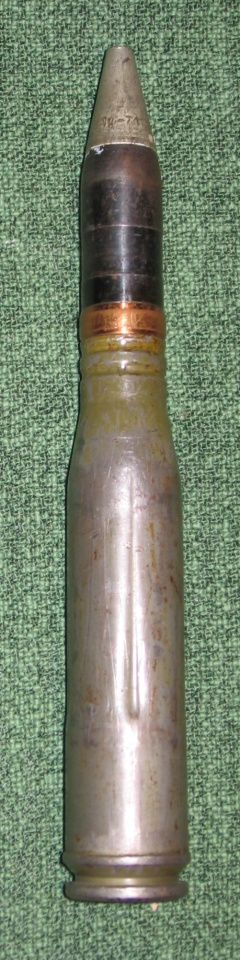
23mm ammunition

Ammunition capacity is 2,000 rounds stowed aboard (520 rounds per each upper autocannon and 480 rounds per each lower autocannon) loaded in 50-round or shorter belts.

The water-cooled 2A7 23mm guns of ZSU-23-4 fire the same 23×152B mm caliber ammunition as the 2A14 guns of the twin-barrel ZU-23-2 towed gun. While the 23mm Volkov-Yartsev VYa-23 aircraft gun used in the Second World War era Il-2 Sturmovik also fired ammunition of the same cartridge case dimensions, the rounds differed in loading and primer, and are thus not interchangeable with the post-war AA gun ammunition. Compared to the VYa and its ammunition, the air defence guns have slightly higher muzzle velocity, and explosive rounds also have slightly larger HE fillings. The VYa ammunition has brass cases, while 2A7/2A14 ammunition has steel cases.

Three main types of 23mm anti-aircraft ammunition were manufactured post-war: API-T, HEI and HEI-T. In addition to the original Soviet rounds, a number of ammunition manufacturers have since begun to produce ammunition for what is still a widely used caliber; these include new ammunition types such as sub-caliber armor-piercing rounds and frangible ammunition. The following table lists the main characteristics of some of the available 23×152B mm ammunition used in 23mm AA guns:

Designation	Type	Projectile Weight [g]	Bursting charge [g]	Muzzle Velocity [m/s]	Description
BZT	API	190	none	970	Blunt AP steel core, with incendiary charge inside windshield cap. Penetration 15 mm RHA at 1000 m range and 30-degree impact angle, or 25mm at 400m and 0-degree impact. Tracer burn time 5 seconds.
OFZ	HE	184	19	980	HE fragmentation round with nose fuzes incorporating self-destruct mechanism.
OFZT	HE-T	188	13	980	HE fragmentation round with a reduced HE charge due to the space taken by the tracer; tracer burn time 5 seconds.
APDS-T	APDS-T	103	none	1220	A Polish sub-caliber armour-piercing round with tracer. Penetration 30 mm RHA at 100 m range and 30-degree impact angle (from perpendicular), tracer burn time >2.5 s.

A typical loading of each ammunition belt contains 40 OFZT and 10 BZT rounds. They can be fired to a maximum horizontal range of 7 km (4.3 mi), and a vertical range of 5.1 km (3.2 mi). The effective vertical range is 1.5 km (0.93 mi) at a direct range to target of 2.5 km (1.6 mi) and target speed of 250 m/s (up to 500 m/s if a modern fire control system is used). The usual autocannon burst consists of 3–10 projectiles and target lead angle is calculated for each burst (fire without adjustment) by computer. In attacking targets on the ground, its effective range is around 2.5 km (1.6 mi). The short range of its 23 mm autocannons and relatively low explosive effect of its small-calibre projectiles mean it is less able to engage threats such as jet attack aircraft and cruise missiles than modern systems like the 2K22 Tunguska armed with more powerful 30 mm autocannons and integrated missile armaments. A special 23 mm round with composite projectiles was developed for a modern variant of SPAAG (ZSU-23-4M4) to be used against cruise missiles.

=== Radar ===
The RPK-2 "Tobol" a.k.a. 1RL33 radar operates in the Ku band and can detect aircraft up to 20 km (12 mi) away. It has excellent target tracking capability and is relatively hard to detect by the enemy. However, the radar picks up many false returns (ground clutter) under 60 m (200 ft) of altitude. The radar antenna is mounted on collapsible supports in the top rear of the turret. There is an optical alignment sight. The RPK-2 radar proved to have good protection against enemy passive electronic radar counter-measures. Nevertheless, the radar system of the ZSU-23-4 has a short detection range during target search, depending on weather conditions (mainly dependent on rain and snow conditions). It is hard to automatically track the target at ranges less than 7–8 km (4.3–5.0 mi) because of the high angular speed of the target at close distances. The radar needs to be reset quite often because of the unstable parameters of electronic cathode-ray tubes of the target selection system. The absence of an automatic laser range finder requires a skilful commander and gunner.

=== Limitations and problems ===
Early versions of the ZSU-23-4 sometimes had problems with "runaway guns": after prolonged periods of firing, the guns would get so hot that chambered rounds would "cook off" even if the operator was not pulling the trigger – discharging the weapon and chambering a new round, which would then also cook off, and continue to do so. This would sometimes continue until the entire belt of ammunition had been expended. Overheating barrels could jam and even break away from the vehicle. The problem resulted from a deficient cooling system and made the early ZSU-23-4s dangerous even to friendly troops standing nearby if this happened. Despite the fact that this seldom happened, Soviet operators learned to give these machines a wide berth.(Perrett 1987:100) It was not recommended to perform continuous fire (bursts longer than 15 seconds without pause) on earlier models until the problem with autocannon reliability and overheating during intense fire was solved on ZSU-23-4M (welded tubes of coolant outlet were replaced with flexible pipes). After the autocannon cooling system was improved, the autocannons became extremely reliable.

The ZSU-23-4 has an 1A7 SRP electro-mechanical fire solution calculator, weighing 180 kg, that occupies all of the space before the Commander. It contains 60 electric motors driving 110 axles over different potentiometers, shafts, rods, cams, gears and linkages to mechanically calculate ammunition flight time until impact, elevation lead angle, and azimuth lead angle using the target parameters received from the 1RL33 RPK-2 (gun dish) radar, and the correction angle received from the GAG (gyroscope) unit.

== Deployment ==
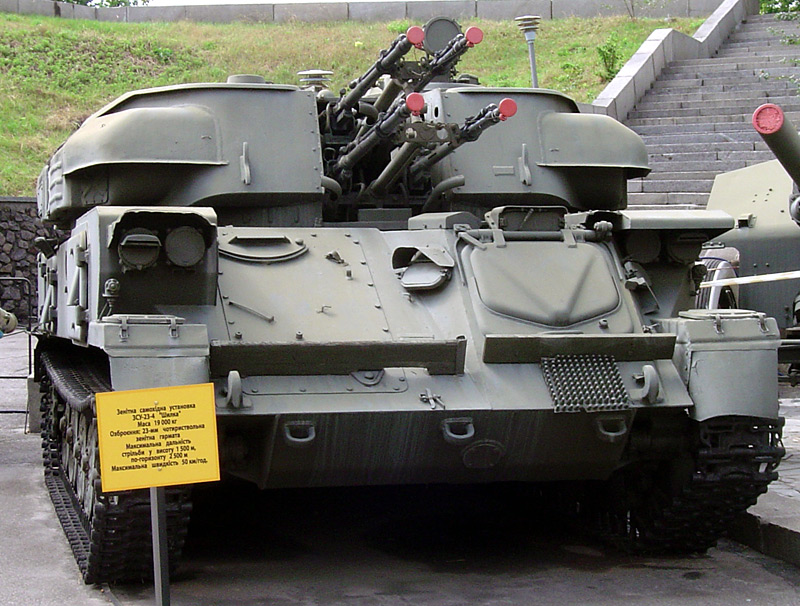
ZSU-23-4 at the Museum of The History of Ukraine in World War II

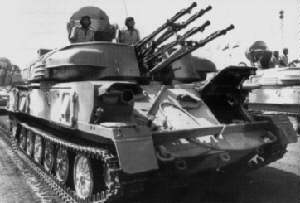
ZSU-23-4

Soviet doctrine supplied the vehicle since 1965 in an anti-aircraft artillery battery of two, four-vehicle platoons for anti-aircraft defence of motor rifle and tank regiments. At the end of the 1960s one platoon was equipped with ZSU-23-4 SPAAGs while another one was still equipped with ZSU-57-2 SPAAGs. ZSU-57-2 was completely replaced with ZSU-23-4 by the beginning of the 1970s. In the 1970s, Soviet motor rifle and tank regiments were equipped with an anti-aircraft missile artillery battery consisting of two platoons, one equipped with four ZSU-23-4 SPAAGs and the other with four 9K31 Strela-1 (SA-9 Gaskin) or later with four 9K35 Strela-10 (SA-13 Gopher) short-range surface-to-air missile systems which cover the dead zones of 2K12 Kub (SA-6 Gainful) surface-to-air missile systems belonging to the divisional level. Since the 1980s Soviet motor rifle and tank regiments were equipped with an anti-aircraft artillery battalion of three batteries (one was equipped with ZSU-23-4 or 9K22 Tunguska SPAAGs, the second one was equipped with 9K35 Strela-10 (SA-13 Gopher) short-range surface-to-air missile systems and the third battery with 9K38 Igla man-portable surface-to-air missiles on IFVs or APCs.

The ZSU-23-4 is very vulnerable to enemy anti-tank missiles, cannons and heavy machine guns; the armour is thin (not exceeding 15 mm) and the exposed wheels, tracks, radar, and gun barrels can easily be damaged in combat. Firing positions of ZSU-23-4 SPAAGs are typically placed near the forward edge of the battle area (FEBA) but behind the main forces, usually 600–1000 m behind objectives when on the defensive or 400–600 m behind the leading tanks on the offensive. ZSU-23-4 SPAAGs are divided evenly along the troop columns on the march.

At first each ZSU-23-4 operated in combat autonomously, without target marking from regimental or divisional air defence. In 1978, the PPRU-1 (mobile reconnaissance and control post) was passed into service of the Soviet Army. The PPRU-1 ("Ovod-M-SV") vehicle is based on MT-LBu armoured tracked chassis and it was intended for control of motor rifle or tank regimental anti-aircraft unit equipped with ZSU-23-4 SPAAGs and 9K31 "Strela-1M" mobile surface-to-air missile systems. The PPRU-1 is equipped with the "Luk-23" radar and an automatic fire control system associated with the divisional air defence system.

The guns are useful against low-flying aircraft and lightly protected ground targets. Due to its effectiveness against ground targets, ZSU-23-4s have been used in urban environments (e.g., Afghanistan, Abkhazia, Chechnya, Syria and Lebanon). This is primarily because the guns can elevate much higher than a tank or APC cannon, enabling armored units equipped with ZSU-23-4s to return fire against ambushes from above.

A small number of ZSU-23-4 SPAAGs are still in use by the Russian Naval Infantry (specifically the 61st Brigade of the Northern Fleet, the 336th Brigade of the Baltic Fleet, and the 155th Brigade of the Pacific Fleet).

== Variants ==
=== Soviet Union ===
- ZSU-23-4 "Shilka" (1964): pre-production and then initial production models.
- ZSU-23-4V "Shilka" (1968): modernized variant with enhanced reliability of some details, ventilation system case located on the hull. Commander vision device was added.
- ZSU-23-4V1 "Shilka" (1970): modernized variant with enhanced reliability of radar system and other details, ventilation system cases located on front bilges of the turret. Guidance-system computer was improved (as well as accuracy and efficiency of anti-aircraft fire on the move at 40 km/h). It is fitted with a slightly improved diesel engine V-6R-1.
- ZSU-23-4M1 (1973): armed with modernized autocannons 2A7M. The pneumatic loading was replaced with pyrotechnic loading (unreliable compressor was removed), welded tubes of coolant outlet were replaced with flexible pipes which increased autocannon barrel life from 3500 rounds to 4500 rounds.
- ZSU-23-4M3 "Biryusa" (1977): equipped with the "Luk" IFF system. All ZSU-23-4M were upgraded to ZSU-23-4M3 level during scheduled repairs. Army unofficially continued to use the name "Shilka" for all variants of ZSU-23-4.
- ZSU-23-4M2 (1978): so-called "Afghan" variant. Reequipment performed during the Soviet–Afghan War for mountain combat. The radar system was removed and a night-sight was added. Ammunition increased from 2,000 to 4,000 rounds.

=== Russian Federation and Belarus ===
- ZSU-23-4M4 and ZSU-23-4M5 (1999): modernized variants, armed with two additional paired "Igla" man-portable air-defense systems on each side of the turret and equipped with 81mm smoke grenade launchers, laser emission sensors, electro-optical vision devices (including television system for driver) and improved weapon radar system. The mechanical transmission was replaced with hydrostatic transmission, and hydraulic boosters were installed. Mobility increased to the level of main battle tanks. This upgrade was first shown during the MAKS-99 exhibition in Zhukovsky and was carried out by the Minotor Service Enterprise and Peleng Joint Stock Company from the Republic of Belarus, and the Ulyanovsk Mechanical Plant of Russia. The Ulyanovsk Mechanical Plant is also offering ZSU-23-4 upgrade packages independently.

=== Ukraine ===
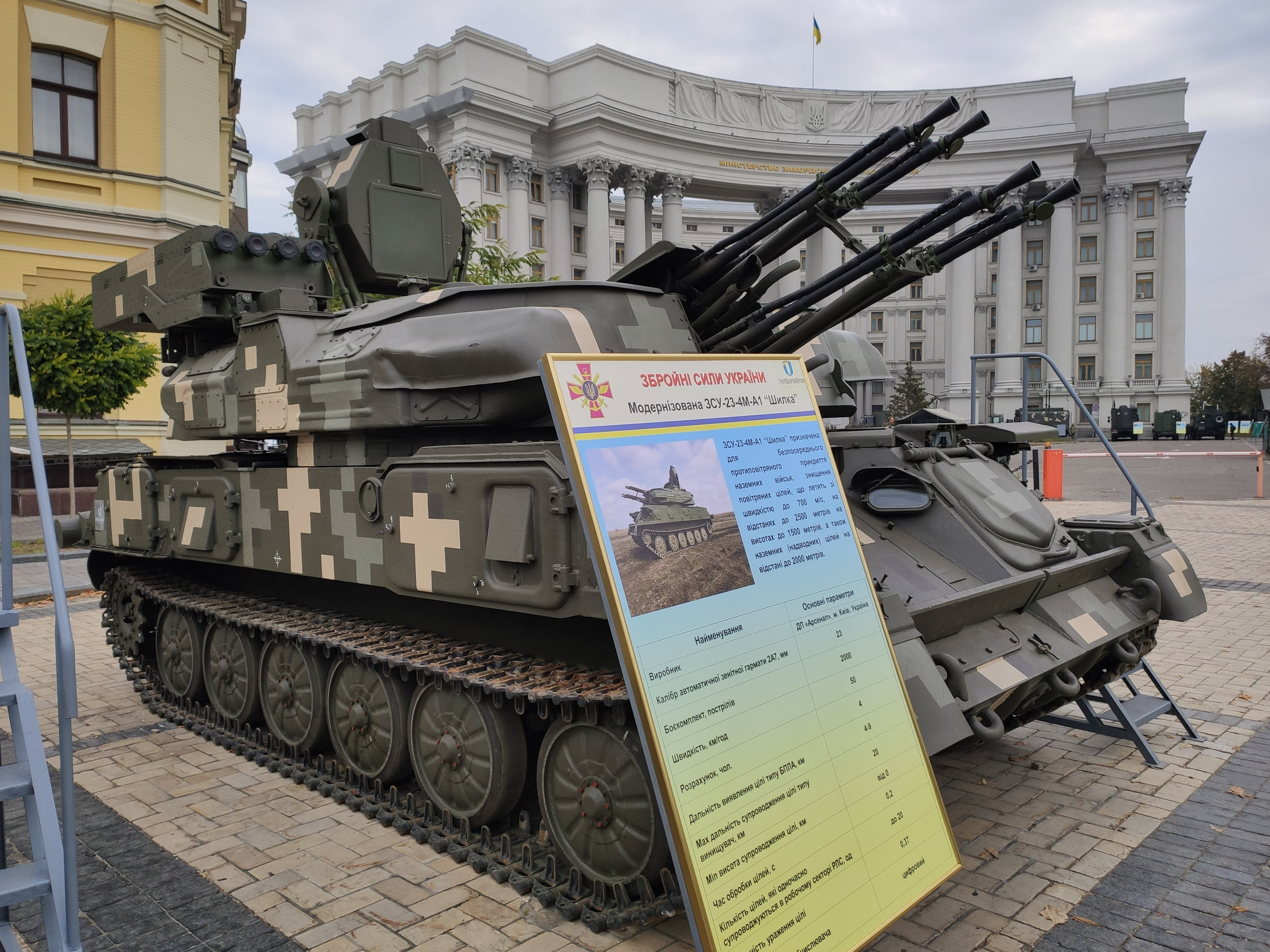
ZSU-23-4M Rokach in Kyiv in 2021

- Donets (1999): This is a Ukrainian modernization developed by the Malyshev Tank Factory in Kharkiv. It uses a modified ZSU-23-4 turret, armed with two additional missiles from the 9K35 Strela-10, installed on the hull of the T-80UD main battle tank. The ammunition capacity for its 23 mm autocannons is doubled.
- ZSU-23-4M-A1 "Rokach" (2017): A modernization package developed by the Arsenal Factory in Kyiv, this system features a new Rokach-AS radar, laser rangefinder, and four automatic Igla missiles.

=== Poland ===
- ZSU-23-4MP Biała (2000): Polish modernized upgrade with 4 Grom surface-to-air missiles and fully digital passive aiming devices instead of the radar.

=== Iran ===
- ZSU-23-4 Soheil :Iranian upgrade with 4 Misagh-2 surface-to-air missiles. Not much is known about it outside of its name and armament. An additional box of unknown use is visible on the rear of the turret.

=== India ===
- ZSU-23-4 upgrade: This version was developed by Bharat Electronics Ltd (BEL) of India in cooperation with Israel Aircraft Industries (IAI). The upgraded systems will feature an advanced 3D active phased array radar and computers, electro-optical fire control systems, a new Caterpillar 359 BHP diesel engine and a new APU. The upgraded systems are able to operate despite enemy jamming, are able to pick up targets from more than 15 km away, and functions in temperatures between 55 °C and minus 40 °C. The gun is able to shoot down targets flying at 450 miles per hour up to 1,500 metres and out to 2,500 metres. The purpose of the upgrade is to extend the life of the air defence system by 15 years. In December 2004 it was reported that the Indian Army awarded a US$104 million contract to upgrade its 48 ZSU-23-4 air defence systems.

=== Netherlands ===
- ZSU-23-4 upgrade (1998): As a private venture, Hollandse Signaalapparaten company (now Thales Nederland) of the Netherlands, obtained a number of ex-East German Army ZSU-23-4V1s and developed an upgrade package. The main part of this upgrade is the modernisation of the radar and fire-control system. The first prototype was completed in mid-1998. The upgraded vehicle is equipped with the ASADS Ka-band target tracking radar and the PAGE I-band surveillance radar.

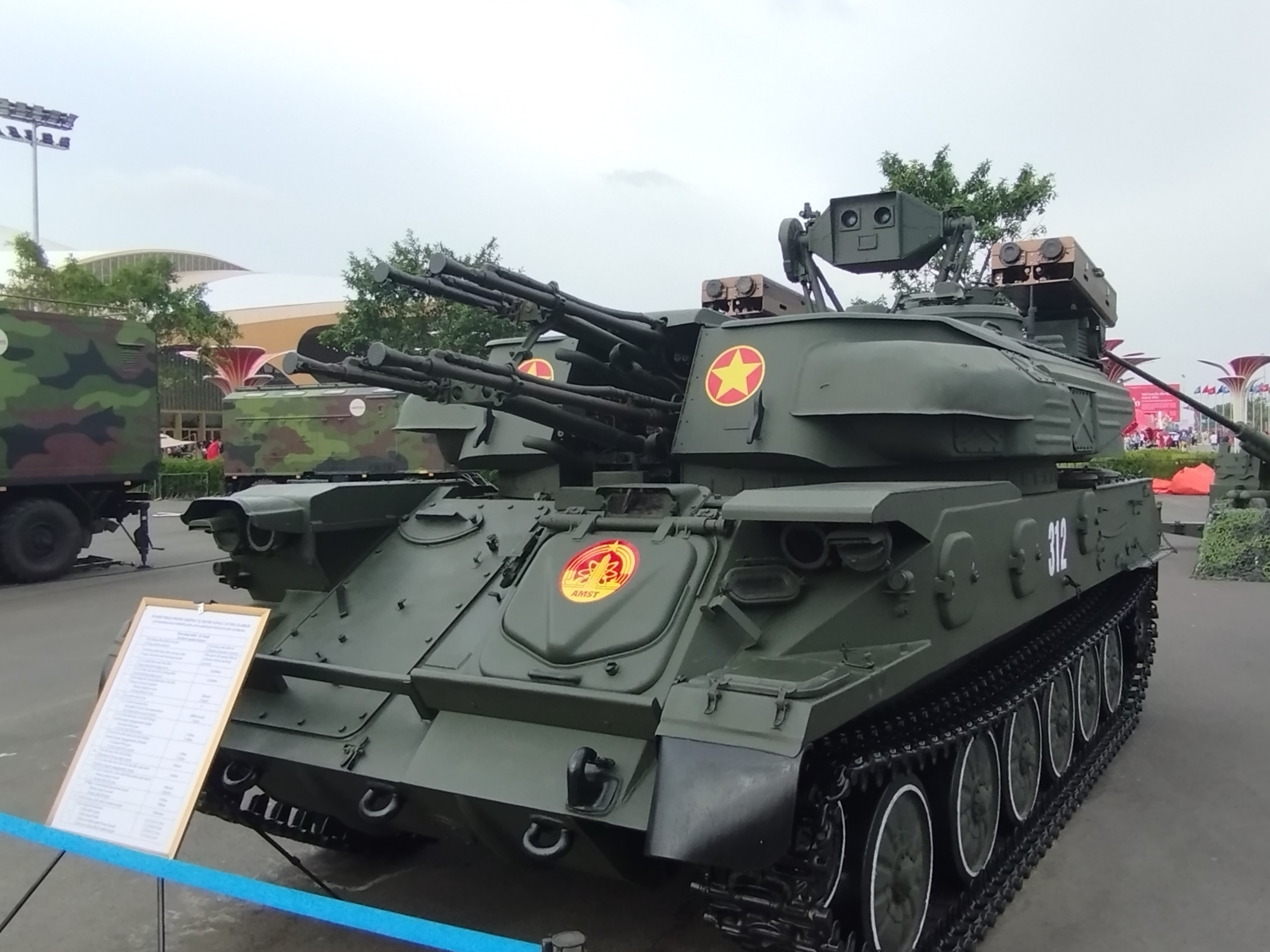
Vietnamese ZSU-23-4

== Combat history ==
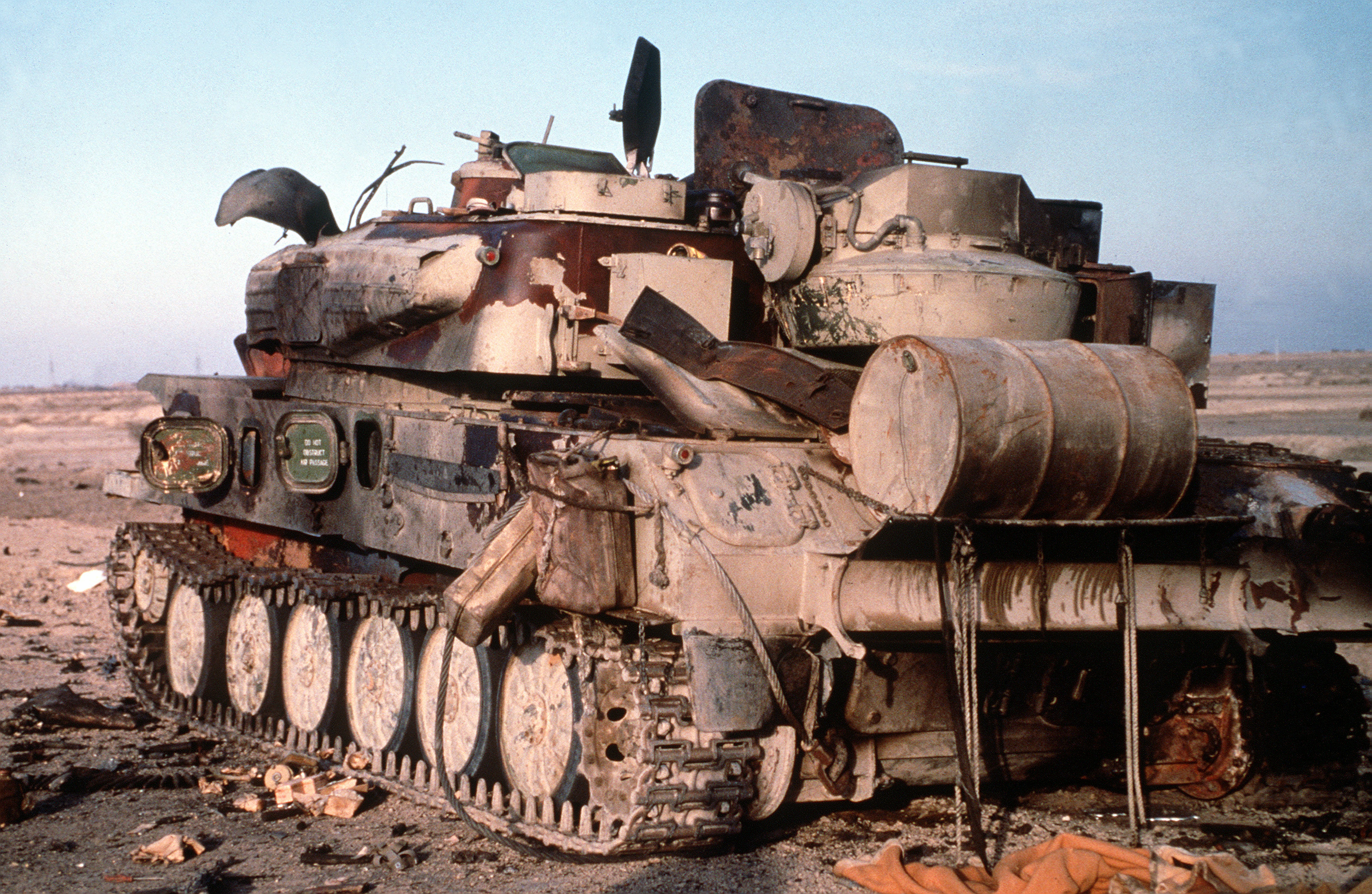
Destroyed Shilka during Gulf War (1991)

- 1966–1989: South African Border War (Angola and Cuba)
- 1968–1970: War of Attrition (Egypt and Syria)
- 1971: Indo-Pakistani war of 1971 (India)
- 1973: Yom Kippur War (Egypt and Syria)
- 1974–1991: Ethiopian Civil War (Ethiopia)
- 1975: Vietnam War (North Vietnam; used during the last stage of Ho Chi Minh Campaign in 1975 by battery of 237th Anti-aircraft Artillery Regiment).
- 1975–1990: Lebanese Civil War (Lebanese army, Syria, various factions)
- 1975–2002: Angolan Civil War (Angola)
- 1975–1990: Western Sahara War (Polisario Front)
- 1977: Egyptian–Libyan War (Libya and Egypt)
- 1977–1978: Ogaden War (Ethiopia, Cuba and Somalia)
- 1979–1989: Soviet–Afghan War (Soviet Union and Afghanistan)
- 1980–1988: Iran–Iraq War (Iran and Iraq)
- 1982: Lebanon War (PLO and Lebanese Army)
- 1986: Operation El Dorado Canyon (Libya)
- 1990: Gulf War (Iraq and Egypt)
- 1990–1994: First Nagorno-Karabakh War (Armenia and Azerbaijan)
- 1992–1993: Georgian–Abkhazian conflict
- 1994–1996: First Chechen War (Russia, Chechen forces)
- 1998–2000: Eritrean–Ethiopian War (Eritrea and Ethiopia)
- 1999: Second Chechen War (Russia)
- 2003: 2003 invasion of Iraq (Iraq)
- 2008: Russo-Georgian War (Russia)
- 2009–present: Boko Haram insurgency (Nigeria)
- 2011: First Libyan Civil War (Pro-Gaddafi and Anti-Gaddafi forces)
- 2011–2024: Syrian Civil War (Government forces, Rebel forces and ISIS)
- 2012–present: Mali War (Mali)
- 2014–present: Russo-Ukrainian War (Ukrainian Army)
  - 2022: Russian invasion of Ukraine (Ukraine and Russian forces)
- 2025: India-Pakistan Conflict (Indian Military)

== Operators ==
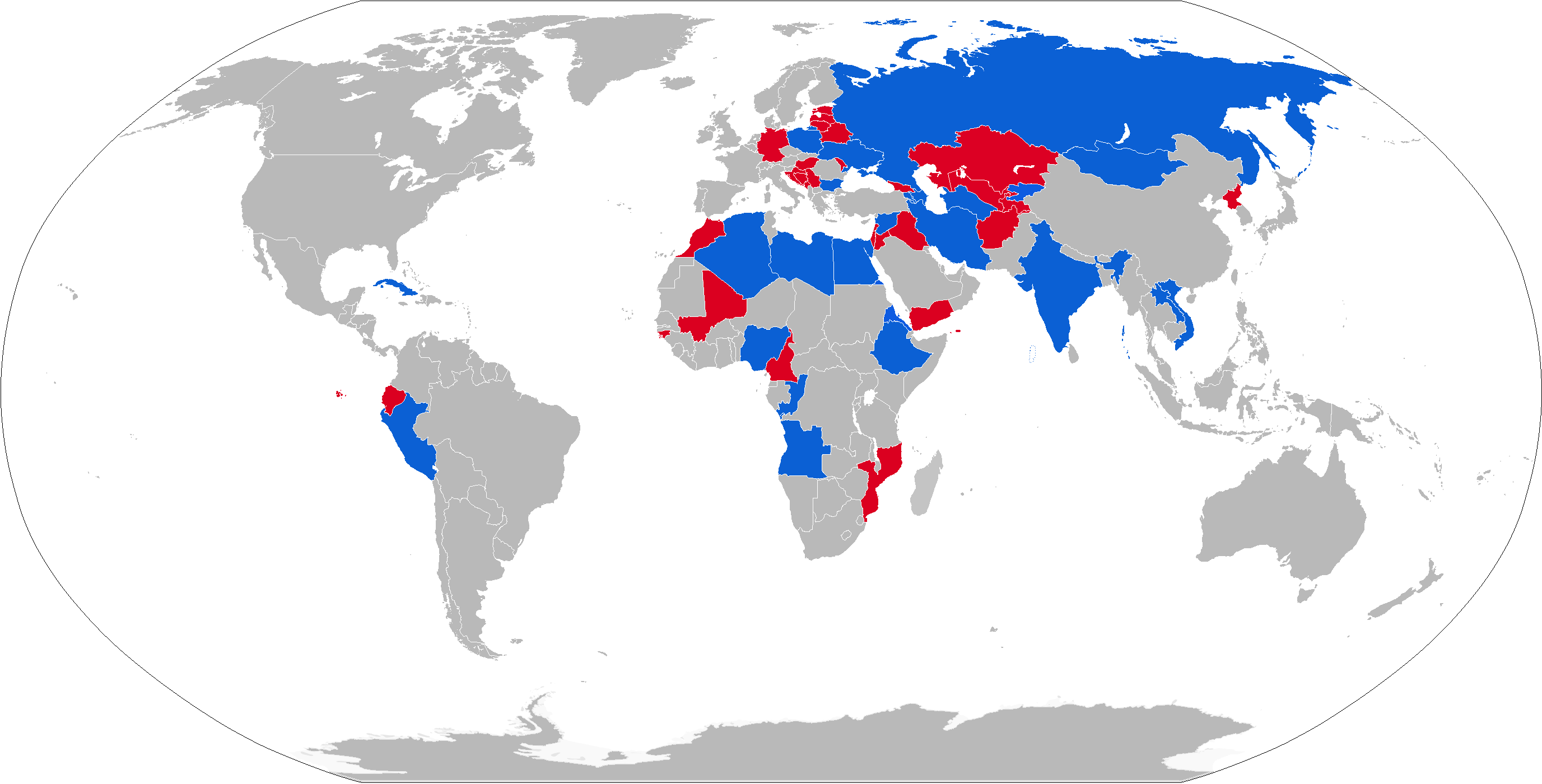
Map of ZSU-23-4 operators Current Former

=== Current ===
- Algeria − Estimated by the International Institute for Strategic Studies to have 225 ZSU-23-4s in service as of 2024
- Angola
- Armenia
- Azerbaijan
- Bulgaria
- Chad − 6 as of 2024
- Congo
- Cuba
- Egypt − 120 in service with the Army and 230 with the Air Defence Command as of 2024
- Eritrea
- Ethiopia
- India − 75 in service as of 2024
- Iran − The first batch of 30 supplied in 1971. 100 in service as of 2024
- Jordan − 48 as of 2024
- Kyrgyzstan - 24 as of 2024
- Laos
- Nigeria
- Peru − 35 in service as of 2024
- Poland − 20 ZSU-23-4MP Bialas and 2 ZSU-23-4s in service as of 2024. Some were donated to Ukraine
- Russia − Unknown number in service with the Army and 60 with the Marines as of 2024
- Syria
- Turkmenistan − 48 as of 2024
- Ukraine − Unknown number in service with the Army and Marines as of 2024
- Vietnam
- Zambia − 4 as of 2024

=== Non-state ===
- (Libya) Libyan National Army
- Sahrawi Arab Democratic Republic
- Syrian Democratic Forces
- Syrian opposition

=== Former ===
- Afghanistan − 20
- Bosnia and Herzegovina − 18, received from Russia in 1997
- Czechoslovakia − 100, licence built
- East Germany − 150
- Ecuador − 34
- Hungary − 14
- Iraq − 200+ in 2002
- Islamic State − At least 2 in 2016, captured from the Syrian Army
- Israel − 60 in 2002
- Lebanon − ex-PLO vehicles operated by the Lebanese Army (2), Lebanese Forces (3), Al-Mourabitoun (3), Amal Movement (3 seized from the Al-Mourabitoun), and People's Liberation Army (2 loaned by Libya) during the Lebanese Civil War.
- Libya − 250 in 2002
- Mali − 3 or 4 in 2013
- Mongolia
- Nicaragua − Sold to Ecuador in 1997
- North Korea − 100+ in 2002
- Palestine Liberation Organization − Used in Lebanon
- Somalia − 4
- South Yemen − 50
- Soviet Union − Passed on to successor states.
- Yemen − 30+ in 2002

== See also ==
- 2K22 Tunguska – (Soviet Union)
- M163 VADS – (United States)
- M247 Sergeant York – (United States)
- SIDAM 25 – (Italy)
- KS-23 – (Soviet Union), 23 mm shotgun, made from rejected ZSU-23-4 barrels
- Korkut – (Turkey)
- Flakpanzer Gepard – (West Germany)

== Bibliography ==
- Abi-Chahine, Bassel (2019). The People's Liberation Army through the eyes of a lens, 1975–1991. Jdeideh (Beirut): Éditions Dergham. ISBN 978-614-459-033-1.
- Cullen, Tony; Foss, Christopher F., eds. (1992). Jane's Land-Based Air Defence: 1992-93 (PDF) (5th ed.). Surrey: Jane's Information Group. ISBN 978-0-7106-0979-3. Archived from the original (PDF) on 27 July 2023.
- Guardia, Mike (2015). Self-Propelled Anti-Aircraft Guns of the Soviet Union. New Vanguard No. 222. illustrated by Henry Morshead. Oxford: Osprey Publishing. ISBN 9781472806222.
- International Institute for Strategic Studies (2024). The Military Balance 2024. Taylor & Francis. ISBN 978-1-040-05115-3.
- Kassis, Samer (2019). Invasion of Lebanon 1982. Abteilung 502. ISBN 978-84-120935-1-3.
- Koll, Christian (2009). Soviet Cannon: A Comprehensive Study of Soviet Arms and Ammunition in Calibres 12.7mm to 57mm. Linz, Austria: Christian Koll. ISBN 978-3-200-01445-9. OCLC 424511896. Archived from the original on 19 October 2009.
- O'Halloran, James C.; Foss, Christopher F., eds. (2002). Jane's Land-Based Air Defense 2002-2003 (15th ed.). Janes Information Group. ISBN 978-0-7106-2437-6.
- Perrett, Bryan (1987). Soviet Armour Since 1945. London: Blandford Press. ISBN 0-7137-1735-1. OCLC 19847519.
- Sayigh, Yezid (1997). Armed Struggle and the Search for State: The Palestinian National Movement, 1949-1993. Clarendon Press. ISBN 978-0-19-829265-4.
- Sex, Zachary; Abi-Chahine, Bassel (2021). Modern Conflicts 2 – The Lebanese Civil War, From 1975 to 1991 and Beyond. Modern Conflicts Profile Guide. Vol. II. AK Interactive. EAN 8435568306073.
- Shirokorad, A. (February 1998), ""Shilka" i drugie otechestvennye ZSU" ["Shilka" and Other Native SPAAGs], Bronekollektsiya (in Russian)
- Zaloga, Steve [Steven J.] (1993). ZSU-23-4 Shilka & Soviet Air Defense Gun Vehicles. Hong Kong: Concord Publications. ISBN 962-361-039-4. OCLC 48683481.
- Tom Cooper & Sergio Santana, Lebanese Civil War Volume 1: Palestinian diaspora, Syrian and Israeli interventions, 1970-1978, Middle East@War No. 21, Helion & Company Limited, Solihull UK 2019. ISBN 978-1-915070-21-0
