= List of anti-aircraft guns =

Anti-aircraft guns are weapons designed to attack aircraft. Such weapons commonly have a high rate of fire and are able to fire shells designed to damage aircraft. They also are capable of firing at high angles, but are also usually able to hit ground targets as well in a direct fire role.

== Towed and static anti-aircraft guns ==
| Caliber (mm) | Number of barrels | Number of missile launchers | Weapon name | Country of origin | Period |
|---|---|---|---|---|---|
| 12.7 | 1 | | DShK | Soviet Union | World War II / Korean War / Cold War / Vietnam War / modern |
| 12.7 | 1 | | M2 Browning | United States | World War II / Korean War / Cold War / Vietnam War / modern |
| 12.7 | 4 | | M45 Quadmount | United States | World War II / Korean War / Cold War / Vietnam War |
| 12.7 | 1 | | NSV machine gun | Soviet Union | Cold War / modern |
| 12.7 | 1 | | Kord machine gun | Russia | Modern |
| 13.2 | 1 | | MG 18 TuF | German Empire | World War I |
| 13.2 | 1–2 | | Hotchkiss M1929 machine gun | France | Interwar / World War II |
| 13.2 | 1–2 | | Breda Model 1931 Machine Gun | Kingdom of Italy | Interwar / World War II |
| 14.5 | 1 | | ZPU-1 | Soviet Union | Cold War / modern |
| 14.5 | 2 | | Type 58 | China | Cold War |
| 14.5 | 2 | | ZPU-2 | Soviet Union | Cold War / modern |
| 14.5 | 4 | | Type 56 | China | Cold War |
| 14.5 | 4 | | ZPU-4 | Soviet Union | Cold War / modern |
| 20 | 1 | | Becker Type M2 | Germany | World War I |
| 20 | 1 | | Madsen 20 mm cannon | Denmark | World War II |
| 20 | 1 | | Solothurn ST-5 | Switzerland | World War II |
| 20 | 1 | | Automatkanon m/40 | Sweden | World War II |
| 20 | 1 | | Oerlikon 20 mm cannon | Switzerland | Interwar / World War II / Cold War |
| 20 | 2 | | Hispano-Suiza HS.404 | France | World War II / Korean War |
| 20 | 1 | | 2 cm FlaK 30 | Nazi Germany | World War II |
| 20 | 1 | | 2 cm FlaK 38 | Nazi Germany | World War II |
| 20 | 1 | | 2 cm GebFlaK 38 | Nazi Germany | World War II |
| 20 | 1 | | Cannone-Mitragliera da 20/77 (Scotti) | Kingdom of Italy | World War II |
| 20 | 1 | | Breda Model 35 | Kingdom of Italy | World War II |
| 20 | 1 | | Nkm wz.38 FK | Poland | World War II |
| 20 | 1-4 | | Polsten | Poland / United Kingdom | World War II |
| 20 | 1 | | Oerlikon GAI-BO1 | Switzerland | Cold War / modern |
| 20 | 1 | | Type 98 20 mm AA Machine Cannon | Japan | World War II |
| 20 | | | Rheinmetall Rh202 | Germany | Cold War |
| 20 | 1 | | Tarasque | France | Modern |
| 20 | | | 20 mm modèle F2 gun | France | Modern |
| 20 | 2 | | TCM-20 | Israel | Cold War |
| 20 | 2 | | 20 ITK 40 VKT | Finland | World War II |
| 20 | 2 | | Type 2 20 mm AA Machine Cannon | Japan | World War II |
| 20 | 2 | | Type 4 20 mm Twin AA Machine Cannon | Japan | World War II |
| 20 | 3 | | Zastava M55 | Yugoslavia | Cold War |
| 20 | 4 | | FlaKv 38 | Nazi Germany | World War II |
| 20 | 6 | | M167 VADS | United States | Vietnam War / Cold War / modern |
| 23 | 2 | | ZU-23-2 | Soviet Union | Cold War / modern |
| 23 | 2 | | Type 85/YW 306 | China | Cold War |
| 25 | | | Mitrailleuse de 25 | France / Japan | Interwar / World War II |
| 25 | | | Luftvärnsautomatkanon M/32 | Sweden | Interwar / World War II |
| 25 | | | 25 mm automatic air defense gun M1940 (72-K) | Soviet Union | Interwar / World War II |
| 25 | 1–2 | | Type 61 25 mm | China | Cold War |
| 25 | 2 | | Type 96 25 mm AT/AA gun | Japan | World War II |
| 30 | 2 | | 3 cm MK 303 Flak | Nazi Germany | World War II |
| 30 | 2 | | PLDvK vzor 53 | Czechoslovakia | Cold War |
| 30 | 2 | | Artemis 30 | Greece | Cold War |
| 35 | 2 | | Oerlikon 35 mm twin cannon | Switzerland | Modern |
| 35 | 2 | 8 | Skyshield | Switzerland | Modern |
| 35 | 6 | | NBS C-RAM | Germany | Modern |
| 37 | 1 | | 3.7 cm SockelFlak L/14.5 | German Empire | World War I |
| 37 | | | Cannone-Mitragliera da 37/54 (Breda) | Italy | World War II |
| 37 | | | Canon de 37 mm Modèle 1925 | France | World War II |
| 37 | | | QF 1 pounder pom-pom | United Kingdom | World War I |
| 37 | | | 3.7 cm FlaK 36 | Nazi Germany | World War II |
| 37 | | | 3.7 cm FlaK 37 | Nazi Germany | World War II |
| 37 | | | 3.7 cm FlaK 43 | Nazi Germany | World War II |
| 37 | | | 37 mm Gun M1 | United States | World War II |
| 37 | | | 37-mm air-defense gun M1939 (61-K) | Soviet Union | World War II / Cold War |
| 37 | | | Type 55 | China | Cold War |
| 37 | 2 | | Type 63 | China | Cold War |
| 37 | 2 | | Type 74 | China | Cold War |
| 37 | 5 | | Flaming onion | German Empire | World War I |
| 40 | | | Vickers 40 mm AT/AA gun | United Kingdom | World War II |
| 40 | | | Bofors L/60 | Sweden | Interwar / World War II / Cold War |
| 40 | | | Bofors (Chrysler) 40 mm/56 | United States | World War II / Korean War / Cold War / Vietnam War |
| 40 | | | Bofors L/70 | Sweden | Cold War / modern |
| 40 | | | Breda L/70 | Italy | Cold War / modern |
| 45 | | | 45 mm anti-aircraft gun (21-K) | Soviet Union | World War II |
| 50 | | | 5 cm FlaK 41 | Nazi Germany | World War II |
| 57 | | | Bofors 57 mm L/60 | Sweden | Cold War / modern |
| 57 | | | S-60 | Soviet Union | Cold War |
| 57 | | | Burileanu | Kingdom of Romania | World War I |
| 57 | | | Type 59 | China | Cold War |
| 75 | | | 75 mm FRC M27 | Belgium | World War II |
| 75 | | | Canon de 75 antiaérien mle 1913-1917 | France | World War I |
| 75 | | | Canon de 75 mm modèle 1924 | France | World War II |
| 75 | | | Canon de 75 CA modèle 1940 Schneider | France | World War II |
| 75 | | | PLK vzor CS | Czechoslovakia | Cold War |
| 75 | | | 75 mm armata wz.36 | Poland | World War II |
| 75 | | | Bofors 75 mm Model 1929 | Sweden | Interwar / World War II |
| 75 | | | 7.5 cm Flak. L/60 | Nazi Germany | World War II |
| 75 | | | 7.5 cm L/45 M/16 anti aircraft gun | Norway | World War II |
| 75 | | | 7.5 cm L/45 M/32 anti aircraft gun | Norway | World War II |
| 75 | | | Type 4 75 mm AA gun | Japan | World War II |
| 75 | | | Type 11 75 mm AA gun | Japan | World War II |
| 75 | | | Type 88 | Japan | World War II |
| 75 | | | 7.5 cm kanon PL vz. 37 | Czechoslovakia | World War II |
| 75 | | | Cannone da 75/46 C.A. modello 34 | Kingdom of Italy | World War II |
| 75 | | | Cannone da 75/27 A.V. | Kingdom of Italy | World War I |
| 75 | | | 75 mm Gun M1916 | United States | World War I |
| 75 | | | Skysweeper | United States | Cold War |
| 75 | | | Vickers Model 1931 | United Kingdom | World War II |
| 76.2 | | | Cannone da 76/40 C.A. | Kingdom of Italy | World War II |
| 76.2 | | | Cannone da 76/40 modificata 35 | Kingdom of Italy | World War II |
| 76.2 | | | Cannone da 76/45 C.A. | Kingdom of Italy | World War I - World War II |
| 76.2 | | | QF 3 inch 20 cwt | United Kingdom | World War I / World War II |
| 76.2 | | | QF 12 pounder 12 cwt AA gun | United Kingdom | World War I |
| 76.2 | | | QF 13 pounder 6 cwt AA gun 13 pounder Mk III | United Kingdom | World War I |
| 76.2 | | | QF 13 pounder Mk IV AA gun | United Kingdom | World War I |
| 76.2 | | | QF 13 pounder 9 cwt 18 pdr gun sleeved down to 3 inch | United Kingdom | World War I |
| 76.2 | | | 3-inch M1917 gun | United States | World War I / Interwar / World War II |
| 76.2 | | | 3-inch M1918 gun | United States | World War I / Interwar |
| 76.2 | | | 3-inch anti-aircraft gun M3 | United States | Interwar / World War II |
| 76.2 | | | 3"/23 caliber gun | United States | World War I / World War II |
| 76.2 | | | 3"/50 caliber gun | United States | World War I / World War II / Korean War / Cold War / Vietnam War |
| 76.2 | | | 3"/70 Mark 26 gun | United States | Cold War |
| 76.2 | | | 76-mm air-defense gun M1914/15 | Russian Empire | World War I |
| 76.2 | | | 76 mm air defense gun M1931 | Soviet Union | World War II |
| 76.2 | | | 76.2 mm/55 (3") 34-K Pattern 1935 | Soviet Union | World War II |
| 76.2 | | | 76-mm air-defense gun M1938 | Soviet Union | World War II |
| 76.2 | | | 7.62 cm FlaK L/30 | German Empire | World War I |
| 76.2 | | | 8 cm L/30 M. 14 R. | Austria-Hungary | World War I |
| 76.2 | | | Type 3 80 mm AA gun | Japan | World War II |
| 76.5 | | | 8 cm Luftfahrzeugabwehr-Kanone M5/8 M.P. | Austria-Hungary | World War I |
| 76.5 | | | Cannone da 77/28 C.A. | Kingdom of Italy | World War II |
| 76.5 | | | Škoda 76.5 mm L/50 | Czechoslovakia | World War II |
| 76.5 | | | 8 cm PL kanon vz. 37 | Czechoslovakia | World War II |
| 77 | | | 7.7 cm FlaK L/27 | German Empire | World War I |
| 77 | | | 7.7 cm FlaK L/35 | German Empire | World War I |
| 80 | | | 8 cm Luftvärnskanon m/40 | Sweden | Interwar / World War II / Cold War |
| 83.5 | | | 8.35 cm PL kanon vz. 22 | Czechoslovakia | World War II |
| 85 | | | 85-mm air-defense gun M1939 (52-K) | Soviet Union | World War II |
| 88 | | | FlaK 16 | German Empire | World War I |
| 88 | | | FlaK 18 | Nazi Germany | World War II |
| 88 | | | FlaK 41 | Nazi Germany | World War II |
| 88 | | | Type 99 88 mm AA gun | Japan | World War II |
| 90 | | | Canon de 90 mm Modèle 1926 | France | World War II |
| 90 | | | 90 mm Gun M1/M2/M3 | United States | World War II / Cold War |
| 90 | | | Cannone da 90/53 | Kingdom of Italy | World War II |
| 90 | | | 9 cm kanon PL vz. 12/20 | Czechoslovakia | World War I / World War II |
| 94 | | | QF 3.7 inch | United Kingdom | World War II |
| 100 | | | KS-19 | Soviet Union | Cold War |
| 100 | | | Type 59 | China | Cold War |
| 100 | | | Type 14 10 cm AA gun | Japan | World War II |
| 102 | | | QF 4 inch Mk V naval gun | United Kingdom | World War I / Interwar / World War II |
| 105 | | | 10.5 cm FlaK 38 | Nazi Germany | World War II |
| 105 | | | 10,5 cm Luftvärnskanon m/42 | Sweden | World War II / Cold War |
| 113 | | | QF 4.5 inch Mk II | United Kingdom | World War II |
| 120 | | | 120 mm Gun M1 ("Stratosphere") | United States | World War II / Cold War |
| 120 | | | Type 3 12 cm AA gun | Japan | World War II |
| 120 | | | Type 10 120 mm AA gun | Japan | World War II |
| 127 | | | 5"/25 caliber gun | United States | World War II |
| 127 | | | 5"/38 caliber gun | United States | World War II / Korean War / Cold War / Vietnam War |
| 128 | | | 5-inch/54-caliber Mark 16 gun | United States | World War II / Korean War / Cold War / Vietnam War |
| 128 | | | 12.8 cm FlaK 40 | Nazi Germany | World War II |
| 130 | | | KS-30 | Soviet Union | Cold War |
| 133 | | | QF 5.25 inch Mark I | United Kingdom | World War II |
| 150 | | | Type 5 15 cm AA gun | Japan | World War II |
| 152 | | | 152 mm air defense gun KM-52 | Soviet Union | Cold War |

== Self-propelled anti-aircraft guns ==
| Caliber (mm) | Number of barrels | Number of missile launchers | Weapon name | Country of origin | Period |
|---|---|---|---|---|---|
| 7.62 | 4 | | 4M motorized quad Maxim | Soviet Union | 1931–42 |
| 12.7 | 4 | | M16 half-track | United States | World War II / Korean War |
| 12.7 | 2 | | T-90 self-propelled anti-aircraft gun | Soviet Union | 1942-43 (prototype) |
| 20 | 1 | | Flakpanzer 38(t) | Nazi Germany | World War II |
| 20 | 1 | | Type 98 half-track | Japan | World War II |
| 20 | 1 | | 20 mm AA machine cannon carrier truck | Japan | World War II |
| 20 | 1 | | 20 mm anti-aircraft tank Ta-Se | Japan | World War II |
| 20 | 2 | | Type 98 20 mm AAG tank | Japan | World War II |
| 20 | 2 | | Centaur AA Mk I and Mk II | United Kingdom | World War II |
| 20 | 3 | | BOV APC | Yugoslavia | Cold War |
| 20 | 2 | | Crusader III 20mm anti-aircraft tank Mk II | United Kingdom | World War II |
| 20 | 4 | | Wirbelwind | Nazi Germany | World War II |
| 20 | 4 | | Tank AA, 20mm quad, Skink | Canada | World War II |
| 20 | 6 | | M163 VADS | United States | Vietnam War / Cold War / modern |
| 20 | 6 | 4 | Machbet | Israel | Modern |
| 23 | 4 | | ZSU-23-4 Shilka | Soviet Union | Cold War / modern |
| 23 | 4 | 4 | ZSU-23-4MP Biala | Poland | Modern |
| 25 | 4 | | Sidam-25 | Italy | Cold War |
| 25 | 2 | 4 | Type 95 SPAAA | China | Modern |
| 25 | | | ZiS-42 motorized anti-aircraft | Soviet Union | early World War II |
| 25 | 2 | | ZSU-25 | Soviet Union | 1945 |
| 30 | 2 | | Kugelblitz | Nazi Germany | World War II |
| 30 | 2 | | AMX-13 DCA | France | Cold War |
| 30 | 2 | | PLDvK-53/59 (M53/59) | Czechoslovakia | Cold War |
| 30 | 2 | | Wildcat SPAA | Germany | Cold War / modern |
| 30 | 2 | 4 | BRAMS | Slovakia | Modern |
| 30 | 2 | 8 | 2K22 Tunguska | Soviet Union | Cold War / modern |
| 30 | 2 | 12 | Pantsir-S1 | Russia | Modern |
| 35 | 2 | | Flugabwehrkanonenpanzer Gepard | Germany | Cold War / modern |
| 35 | 2 | | Fliegerabwehrpanzer 68 | Switzerland | Cold War |
| 35 | 2 | | PZA Loara | Poland | Modern |
| 35 | 2 | | Marksman | United Kingdom | Modern |
| 35 | 2 | | Type 87 | Japan | Modern |
| 35 | 2 | | Type 09 SPAAA | China | Modern |
| 35 | 2 | | KORKUT | Turkey | Modern |
| 37 | 2–4 | | Flakpanzer Coelian | Nazi Germany | World War II |
| 37 | 1 | | Möbelwagen | Nazi Germany | World War II |
| 37 | 1 | | Ostwind | Nazi Germany | World War II |
| 37 | 1 | | ZSU-37 | Soviet Union | 1944-1948 |
| 37 | 2 | | Type 63 | China | Cold War / Vietnam War |
| 40 | 1 | | Landsverk L-62 Anti II | Sweden | World War II |
| 40 | 2 | | Luftvärnskanonvagn fm/43 | Sweden | Cold War |
| 40 | 1 | | Luftvärnskanonvagn 9040 | Sweden | Modern |
| 40 | 2 | | 40M Nimród | Hungary | World War II |
| 40 | 1 | | Pierce-Arrow armoured AA lorry | United Kingdom | World War I |
| 40 | 1 | | Crusader III 40mm anti-aircraft tank Mk I | United Kingdom | World War II |
| 40 | 2 | | M19 multiple gun motor carriage | United States | World War II / Korean War |
| 40 | 2 | | M42 Duster | United States | Cold War / Vietnam War |
| 40 | 2 | | M247 Sergeant York | United States | Cold War (cancelled) |
| 57 | 2 | | ZSU-57-2 | Soviet Union | Cold War / Vietnam War |
| 75 | 1 | | Autocanon de 75mm mle 1913 | France | World War I |
| 76 | 1 | | Otomatic air defense tank | Italy | Modern |
| 76.2 | 1 | | YaG-10 motorized anti-aircraft | Soviet Union | World War II (1940) |
| 77 | 1 | | 7.7 cm Leichte Kraftwagengeschütze M1914 | German Empire | World War I |
| 88 | 1 | | Pz. Sfl. IVc | Nazi Germany | World War II |
