= Type 65 =

Type 65 can refer to:

- Type 65 torpedo, a Soviet (later: Russian) torpedo
- Type 65 assault rifle, a Taiwanese assault rifle
- Type 65 military uniform, a version of the Chinese army's uniform
- Type 65 anti-aircraft gun, a Chinese 37 mm anti-aircraft gun
- Type 63/65 anti-aircraft gun, the unofficial name for a Vietnamese self-propelled anti-aircraft gun
