= Type 63 =

Type 63 may refer to:

- Type 63 (armoured personnel carrier) (YW531)
- Type 63/65 self-propelled anti-aircraft gun – unofficial name for a Vietnamese unnamed self-propelled anti-aircraft gun
- Type 63 (tank)
- Type 63 mortar – 60 mm mortar
- Type 63 multiple rocket launcher – 107mm MRL
- Type 63 multiple rocket launcher – 130 mm MRL, similar to the Russian BM-14
- Type 63 assault rifle
- Type 63 field gun, origin Thailand
- Type 63 rifle, North Korean version of the SKS rifle
