= Type 53 =

Type 53 may refer to:

- Bugatti Type 53, motor vehicle produced by the auto-maker Bugatti
- Bristol Type 53, an experimental British military aircraft first flown in 1922
- Cadillac Type 53, motor vehicle produced by the auto-maker Cadillac
- Polaroid Type 53, a discontinued large format instant film, similar to Polaroid type 55.
- Type 53 torpedo, a Russian torpedo
- Type 53 carbine, a Chinese version of the Mosin–Nagant
- Type 53 machine gun, a Chinese version of the Degtyaryov machine gun
- Type 53 heavy machine gun, a Chinese version of the SG-43 Goryunov
- Type 53 82 mm mortar, a Chinese version of the 82-BM-37
- Type 53 120 mm mortar, a Chinese version of the 120-PM-43 mortar
- Tarasque Type 53 T2, a 20 mm anti-aircraft gun adopted by the French Army
