= Flaming onion =

WW1-era German anti-aircraft gun

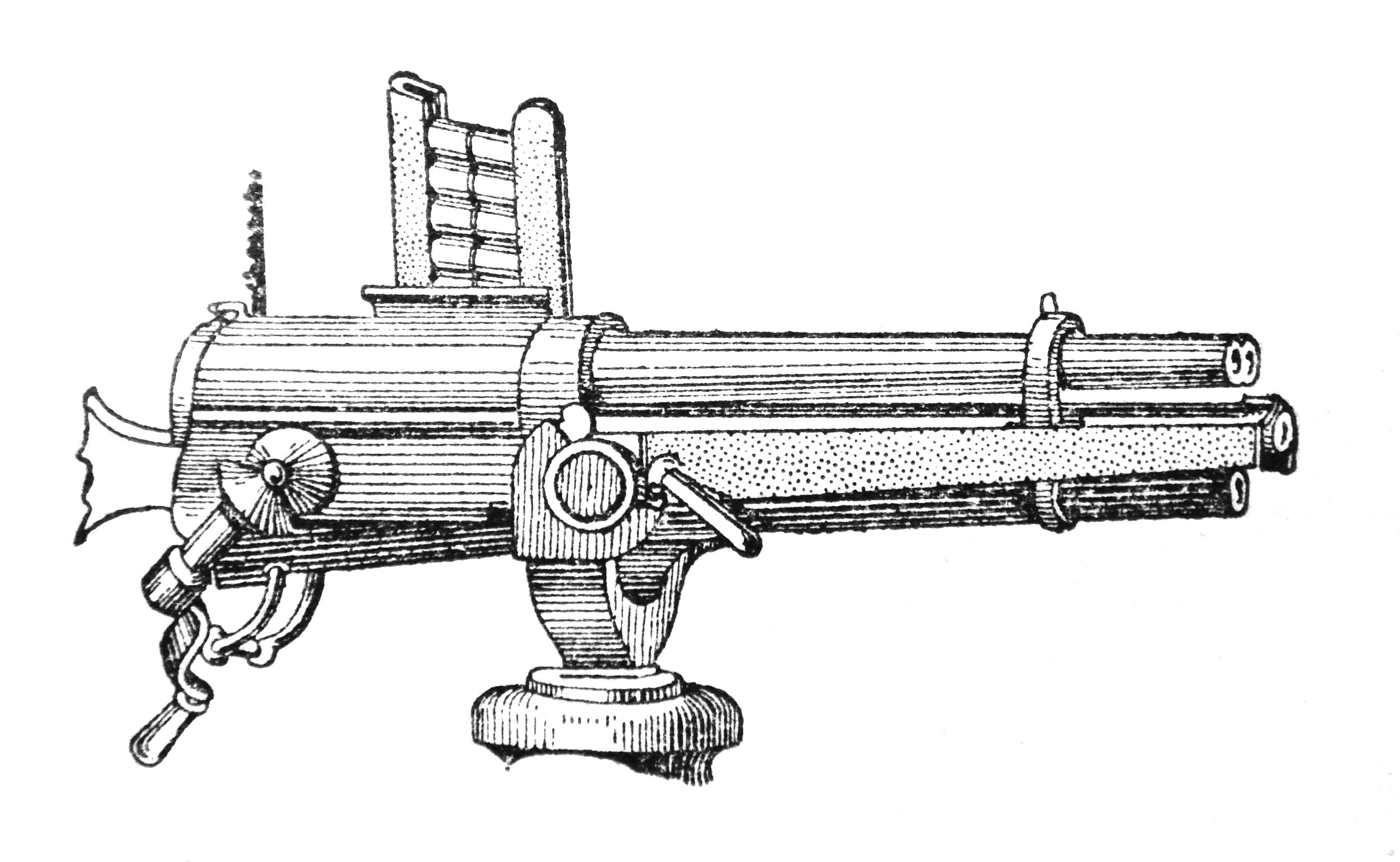
Hotchkiss cannons like this were used as naval guns, infantry support guns, and anti-aircraft guns by Germany during World War I.

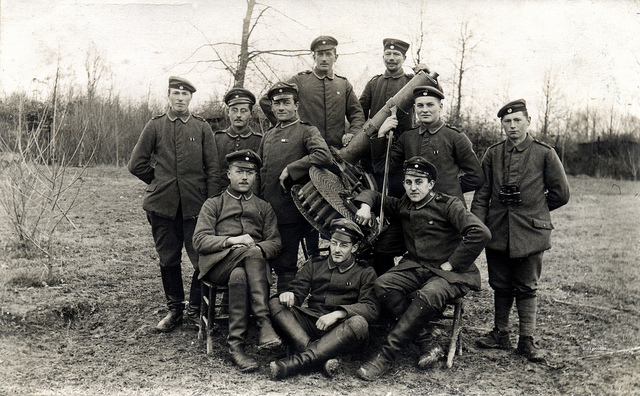
A Maxim Flak M14 Anti-Aircraft Crew.

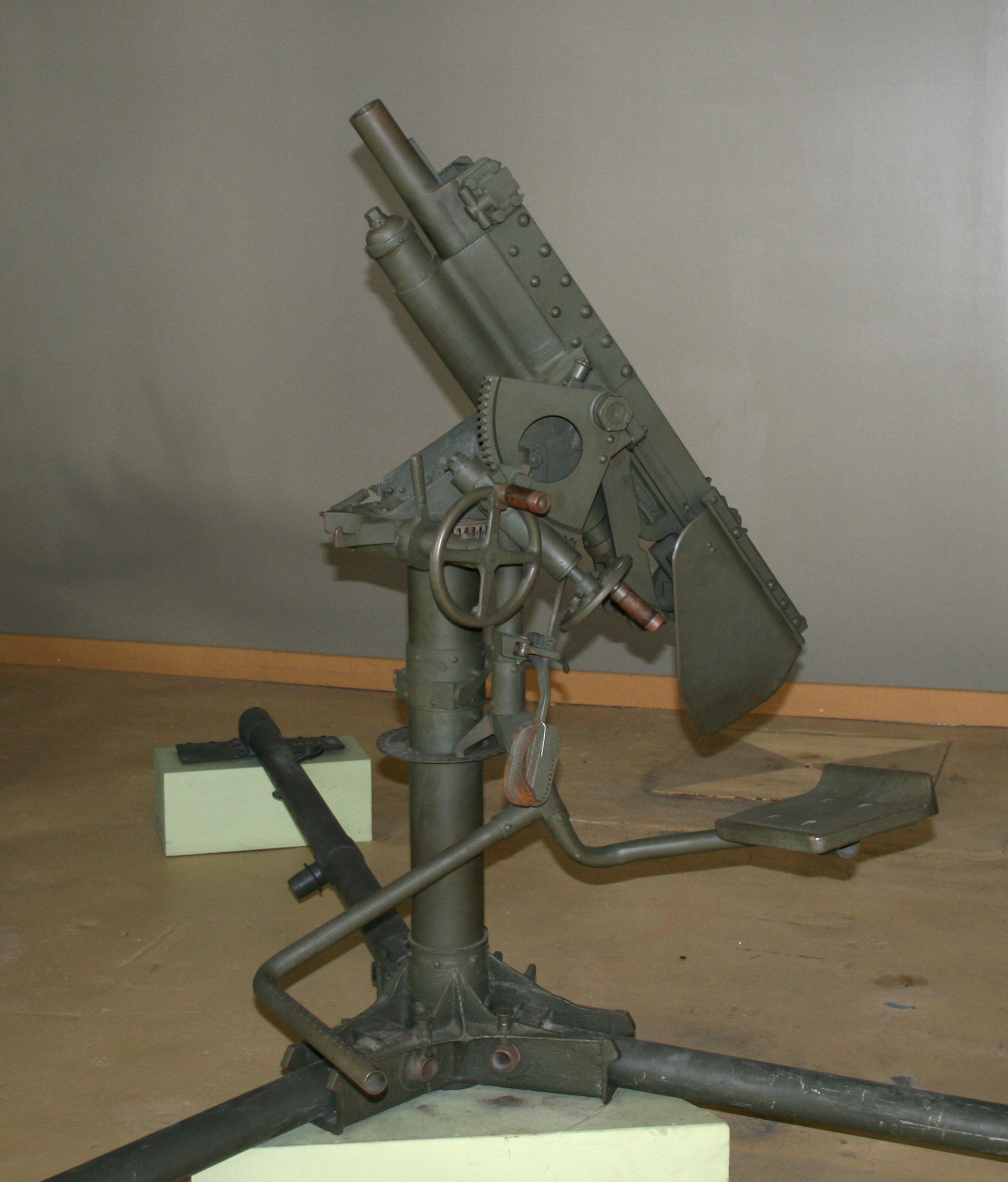
A 3.7 cm SockelFlak L/14.5

The flaming onion was a 37 mm Hotchkiss revolving-barrel anti-aircraft gun used by the German army at the beginning of World War I, the name referring to both the gun, and especially the flare or tracer ammunition it fired. The American "balloon-buster" ace, Frank Luke, was a prominent victim of later versions of this device, and it was mentioned in Eddie Rickenbacker's book Fighting the Flying Circus and in many "Biggles" stories. Later in the war the term was also applied to any sort of anti-aircraft fire that used a visible tracer, appearing in reports of combat from the Battle of Taranto, for instance.

The first "flaming onion" weapon was a 37mm Hotchkiss type, smooth bore, short barreled Gatling-type revolving cannon called a "lichtspucker" (light spitter) that was designed to fire flares at low velocity in rapid sequence across a battle area. This gun had five barrels and could launch a 37 mm artillery shell about five thousand feet (1,500 m). To maximize the chance of a strike, all five rounds were discharged as rapidly as possible, giving the "string of flaming onions" effect. Because larger caliber anti-aircraft rounds were fired more slowly, this gun's rapid rate of fire and the perspective from the pilot's seat, left many fliers thinking that the rounds were chained together or otherwise attached by strings of wire, and they feared being shredded by it. Other 3.7 cm anti-aircraft guns such as the Maxim Flak M14 and 3.7 cm SockelFlak L/14.5 also shared the "Flaming Onion" nickname.

Because all launchers were located well behind the lines, none were captured until the last days of the war on the Western Front. Because the early Hotchkiss weapon was not designed for anti-aircraft use, it did not have purpose-designed ammunition, but the flares were thought to be dangerous to doped-fabric covered aircraft. It appears that the design of specialist ammunition took place in tandem with design of higher velocity automatic anti-aircraft weapons; which may explain why the standard heavy automatic AA gun used by the Germans in World War II was of 37 mm caliber.

The name "flaming onion" was also used for a number of unrelated military topics. One of these was the mythical German device that exploded in such a way that it resembled a bomber being hit, although these also went by a variety of other names, including "scarecrows". It also included a napalm rocket used by the RAAF during the Korean War, It is also the nickname of a military insigne that depicts an old-fashioned grenade with a lit fuse. The device is in various armies; examples include The Canadian Grenadier Guards, The Princess Louise Fusiliers, the British Royal Engineers and Royal Artillery (displayed on their "collar dogs"), and the U.S. Army's ordnance departments.

== See also ==
- Anti-aircraft warfare
