= QF 13-pounder Mk IV AA gun =

QF 13 pounder Mk IV anti-aircraft gun
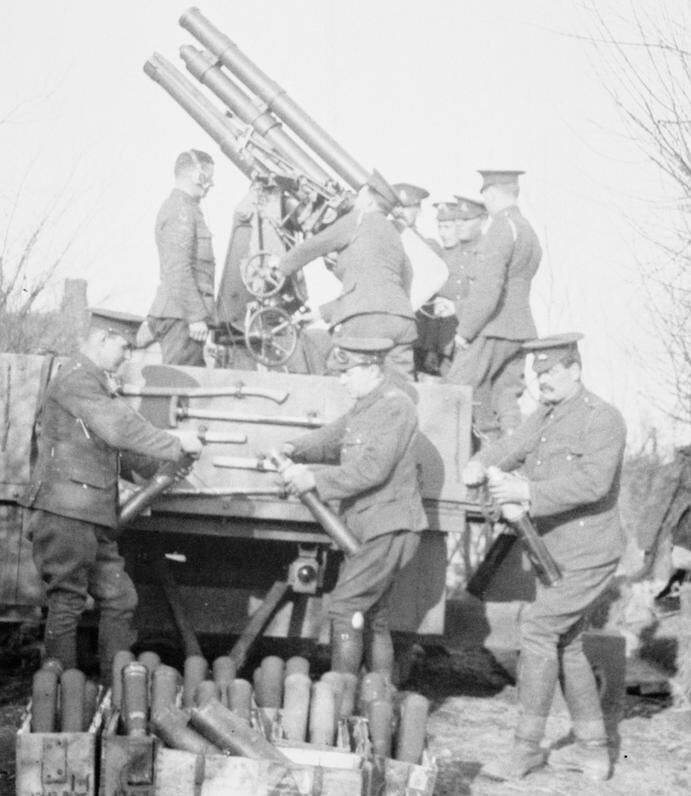
- A posed photo from early in World War I, showing gunners setting fuzes
- Type: Anti-aircraft gun
- Place of origin: United Kingdom

Service history
- In service: 1915–1918
- Used by: British Empire
- Wars: World War I

Production history
- Designer: Elswick Ordnance Company
- Manufacturer: Elswick Ordnance Company
- Produced: 1914
- No. built: 6

Specifications
- Barrel length: Bore: 5 feet 6 inches (1.68 m); Total: 5 feet 10 inches (1.78 m)
- Shell: 12.5 pounds (5.67 kg) Shrapnel; later HE
- Calibre: 3-inch (76.2 mm)
- Breech: Nordenfelt eccentric screw
- Recoil: Hydro-spring
- Carriage: high-angle mounting on lorry
- Elevation: 0° - 85°
- Traverse: 360°
- Muzzle velocity: 1,600 ft/s (490 m/s) approx.

The Ordnance QF 13-pounder Mk IV anti-aircraft gun was an Elswick Ordnance commercial 3 inch 13-pounder gun of which 6 were supplied during World War I. The Ordance QF 13-pounder MK IV is unrelated to the other British Mks 13-pounder.

== History ==
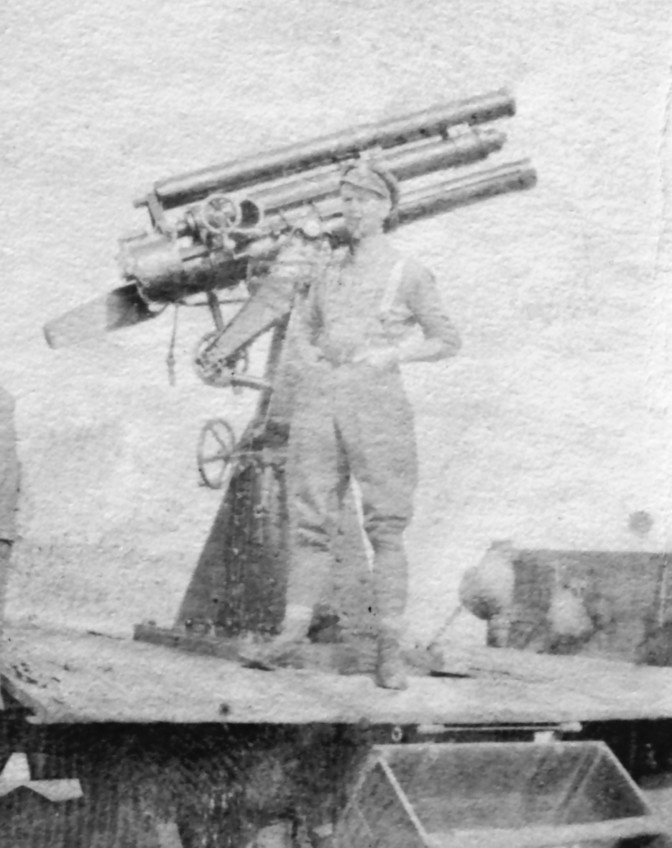
Gunner of 99th Anti-aircraft Section at Salonika, with gun mounted on a Thornycroft lorry.

Elswick Ordnance had already developed the gun as a commercial venture and supplied the existing 6 guns to the British government in 1915 when the need for anti-aircraft guns became urgent. All 6 were eventually sent to the Western Front and then various other theaters. Precise theaters of service are difficult to ascertain due to writers often not differentiating between various Mks of 13-pounder guns. 2 guns are known to have been operated by 99th Anti-Aircraft Section at Salonika from July 1917 until the end of the war.

It is visibly identified by having 2 recoil/recuperator cylinders above the barrel. The cylinder immediately above the barrel is slightly shorter than the barrel, and the top cylinder is slightly longer than the barrel. The overall appearance is of a standard 13-pounder with an additional, slightly longer, recuperator cylinder on top. The gun breech also differed from standard British practice, in that it used a Nordenfelt breech similar to that of the French 75, but inverted : the breech was opened and closed by rotating it about an axis near the top of the barrel, which uncovered and covered the slot for entering the cartridge, rather than unscrewing and swinging it out as with the typical British Welin or Asbury breech.

== See also ==
- List of anti-aircraft guns
