= Type 65 (military uniforms) =

Chinese People's Liberation Army uniform

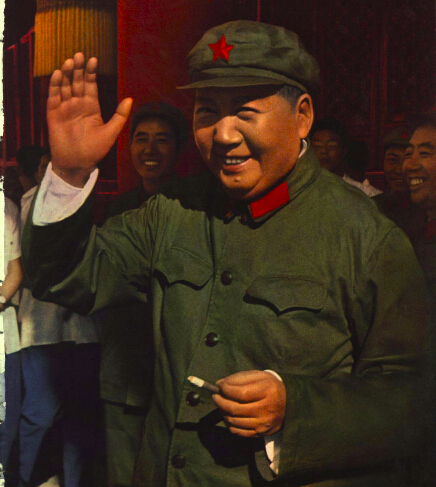
Mao Zedong in a 65-style military uniform

Type 65 uniform (Chinese: 中国人民解放军65式军服) of the Chinese People's Liberation Army is the standard military uniform that the PLA began to equip in 1965. The Type 65 uniform is the longest-serving uniform of the PLA to date. It is called the Type 65 uniform because it was officially adopted in 1965.

== Overview ==
On May 22, 1965, the Ninth Session of the Standing Committee of the Third National People's Congress decided to abolish the military rank system, and on this basis, completely abolish the Type 55/58 uniforms. The new uniforms abolished the complicated decorations and only wore full red five-pointed stars and red collar tabs, and dress uniforms were also abolished. Officers and soldiers uniformly wore liberation caps. Due to the long service time, the Type 65 uniforms have become a stereotype of the People's Liberation Army in the world. At the same time, politically, the Type 65 uniforms are also regarded as one of the symbols of the Cultural Revolution.

== Clothing ==
Type 65 uniforms The main body of the Type 65 uniforms for men uniforms uniformly adopted stand-up collars, while the women uniforms uniforms adopted small stand-up collars and wore liberation caps. The color of the army uniforms was grass green, the air force uniforms were grass green for the upper garment and sea blue for the lower garment, and the navy uniforms were gray. Since the Type 65 uniforms abolished the military rank system, officers and soldiers could only be distinguished by the details of the pocket style of the uniforms.

The officers' uniforms had four unbuttoned pockets, while the soldiers' uniforms had two buttoned pockets. In the early days of the Type 65 uniform's distribution, a large number of Type 55 uniforms with Type 65 uniform decorations were worn together with the Type 65 uniform. In winter, a fur-lined hat and a double-breasted coat with a fur collar were worn. The summer uniforms for all officers and soldiers were made of pure cotton poplin, and the winter uniforms were made of pure cotton khaki.

== Type 71 Uniform ==
In 1971, with the development of textile technology in the People's Republic of China, the Type 65 uniform's single cotton fabric was replaced with a synthetic fabric blended from three materials. This fabric was called "Dacron", and the Type 65 uniform using this synthetic fabric was called the Type 71 uniform. At the same time, the PLA's honor guard and the Central Guard Regiment adopted the Type 65 uniform made of coarse wool twill.

== Type 74 Uniform ==
On May 1, 1974, the Type 65 uniform underwent a major design change. Army female soldiers began to be issued brimless soft caps and skirts, naval officers' uniforms were changed to white and they were given peaked caps, and soldiers began to be issued sailor uniforms. The modified uniforms were called the Type 74 uniforms.

Type 78 uniforms In 1978, the People's Liberation Army carried out another large-scale improvement on the uniform fabric based on the Type 71 uniforms. The new uniforms used a chemical synthetic fabric called "polyester twill". Due to the use of this fabric, the weight of the new uniforms was reduced and the quality was improved. The improved uniforms were called the Type 78 uniforms.

== Decoration ==
The decoration of the Type 65 military uniform was extremely simple, using only a five-pointed red star and a pair of red collar tabs as decoration. At the time, it was called "a red star on the head and a revolutionary red flag on both sides" and this simple decoration once became a symbol of the People's Liberation Army.

== In culture ==
The Type 65 uniform, due to its long service period (1965-1985), has become a stereotype and cultural symbol of the People's Liberation Army. At the same time, during the Cultural Revolution, the unmarked Type 65 uniform was welcomed by a large number of Red Guards, and even Mao Zedong himself wore the Type 65 uniform when meeting with Red Guards. Therefore, the Type 65 uniform, along with Quotations from Chairman Mao Tse-tung, Mao Zedong badges, Red Guard armbands, etc., became a cultural symbol of the Cultural Revolution.
