= Bofors 75 mm Model 1929 =

Bofors 75 mm and 80 mm guns
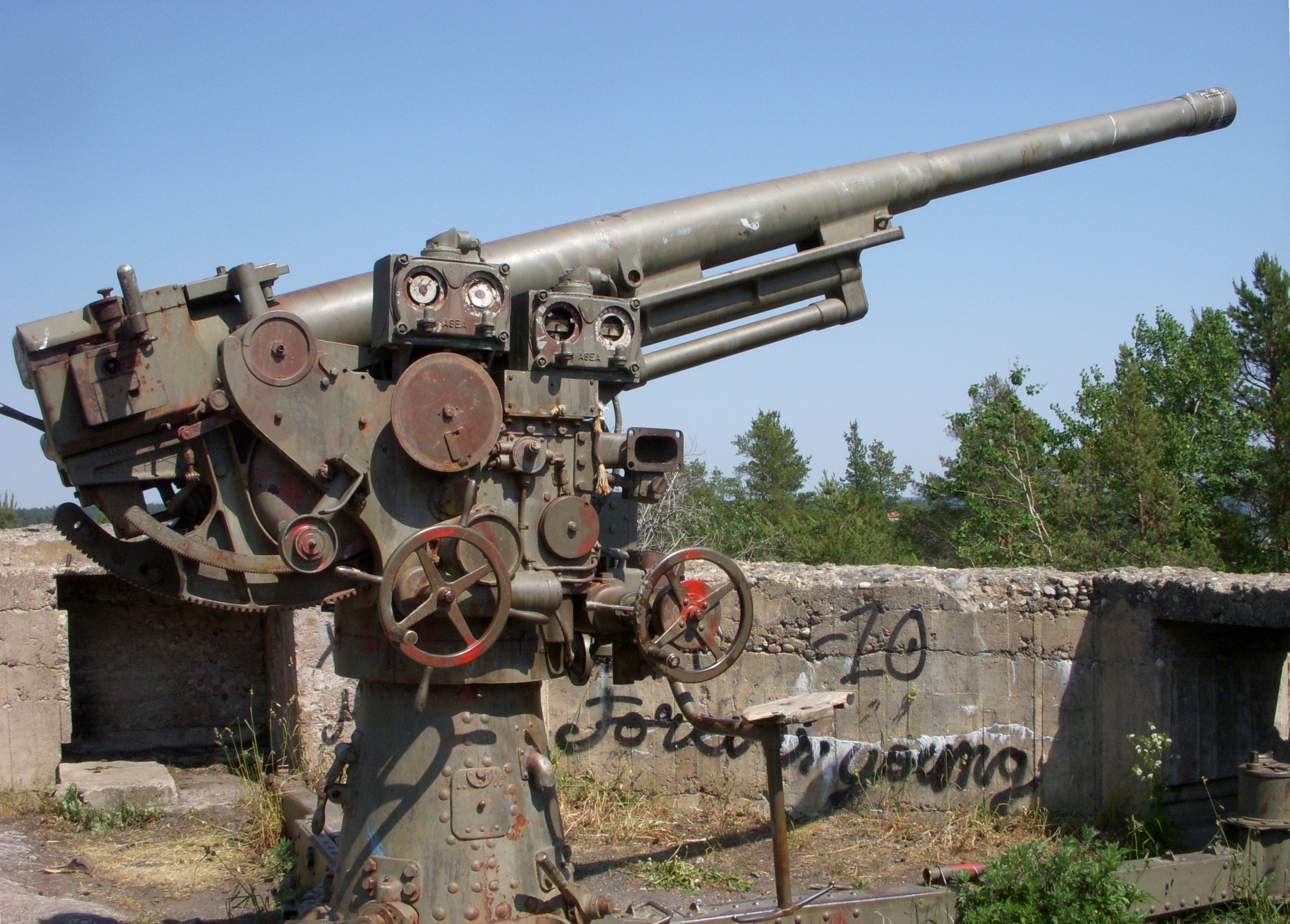
- Bofors '7,5 cm luftvärnskanon m/29' as part of Swedish coastal fortifications. Note that the gun is missing the recuperator above the barrel and some other parts.
- Type: Anti-aircraft gun
- Place of origin: Sweden

Service history
- In service: 1930–present
- Used by: Argentina; China; Dutch East Indies; Finland; Greece; Hungary; Persia; Thailand; Netherlands
- Wars: World War II

Production history
- Designer: Bofors AB, Krupp
- Designed: 1928
- Manufacturer: Bofors AB
- Produced: 1930

Specifications
- Mass: 7.5 cm m/30: combat 3,300 kg (7,300 lb); 8 cm m/29: travel 4,200 kg (9,300 lb), combat 3,300 kg (7,300 lb)
- Length: 7.5 cm m/30: 5.9 m (19 ft 4 in)
- Barrel length: 7.5 cm m/30: 3.9 m (12 ft 10 in) L/52; 8 cm m/29: 4 m (13 ft) L/50
- Crew: dependent on use
- Shell: 7.5 cm m/30: 75×604mmR
- Shell weight: 7.5 cm m/30: 6.4 kg (14 lb); 8 cm m/29: 8 kg (18 lb)
- Caliber: 7.5 cm m/30: 75 mm (3.0 in); 8 cm m/29: 80 mm (3.1 in)
- Elevation: -3° / +80°
- Traverse: 360°
- Muzzle velocity: 7.5 cm m/30: 850 m/s (2,800 ft/s); 8 cm m/29: 750 m/s (2,500 ft/s)
- Maximum firing range: 7.5 cm m/30: 11 km (36,000 ft); 8 cm m/29: 10 km (33,000 ft)

Bofors 75 mm and Bofors 80 mm were two closely related designs of anti-aircraft and general-purpose artillery. Less well known than the 40 mm quick-firing AA gun, the gun was nevertheless adopted by armed forces of numerous countries during World War II, including Argentina, China, the Dutch East Indies, Finland, Greece, Hungary, Persia and Thailand. It was closely related to the 8.8 cm Flak 18, one of the best-known AA guns of World War II, which was partially based on it. Some pieces captured by the Japanese in China served as the blueprint for the Type 4 75 mm AA Gun, a reverse-engineered clone of the Bofors 75mm gun.

== History and development ==
World War I AA guns were often pieces of standard medium-calibre artillery modified for anti-aircraft fire. However, fast development of aerial warfare meant that a higher muzzle velocity was needed to target modern planes flying faster and at higher altitudes. Having lost the war, Germany had been forbidden from developing new weapons of most types by the Treaty of Versailles. However, the Krupp company almost immediately started cooperation with the Swedish Bofors (partially owned by Krupp) to develop a new AA gun. By 1925 Krupp acquired a controlling interest in the Swedish firm and a team of German experts was sent to Sweden.

The development of a new gun was funded secretly by the Reichswehr. The resulting 75 mm gun proved adequate to the Swedes, but extensive trials of two German prototypes (the 7.5 cm Flugabwehrkanone L/60 and 7.5 cm Flugabwehrkanone L/59) by the German army proved unsatisfactory and the Germans requested a heavier design. The 75 mm was then modified to include a larger calibre barrel, which was further developed into the 8.8 cm Flak 18, one of the best-known AA guns of World War II.

Nevertheless, despite the German unwillingness to buy the 75 mm variant, the Swedish company decided to start serial production anyway. There were many notable differences between Krupp's design and the one eventually produced by the Swedish company, but both guns shared a similar layout and a cruciform firing platform, which allowed the gun to traverse full 360 degrees and fire in all directions. The platform was lowered to the ground from two wheeled axles, which had to be removed before firing. One of major advantages of the Swedish design over the 88 eventually adopted by Germany was its simplicity: it lacked complicated fire-control mechanisms, but was easy enough to operate by less-well trained crews in poorer countries.

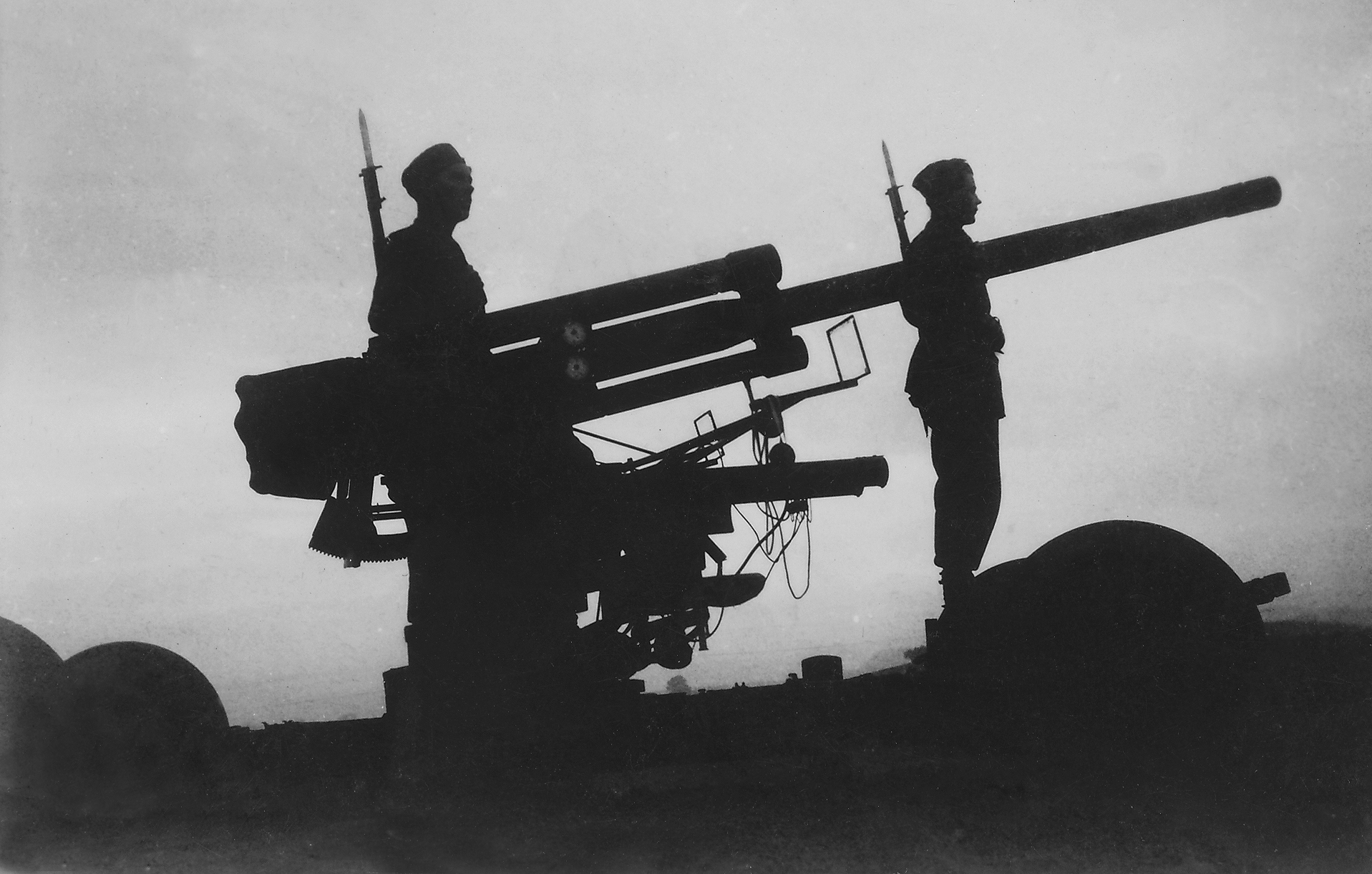
The m/29 and m/30 guns formed the backbone of the Swedish passive air defence during and immediately after World War II

== Operational use ==
=== Sweden ===
The Swedish gun entered service in the Swedish Army under two distinct designations: luftvärnskanon m/29 (an extremely similar gun was produced few years earlier by German-affiliated HIH Siderius in the Netherlands) and luftvärnskanon m/30, both produced either in 75 mm ("7,5 cm") and 80 mm ("8 cm") bore, depending on the order. Later, a slightly modified 75 mm luftvärnskanon m/30-37 (also known as luftvärnskanon m/37) gun entered service.

=== Finland ===
In November 1929 Finland bought eight early prototypes and test-series guns of the mobile variant and pressed them into service as 76 ItK/28 B and 76 ItK/29 B, ItK standing for IlmaTorjuntaKanuuna, "Anti-air gun". Unlike later models, the gun used a different transport system with one heavy axle and two wheels. During the Winter War the guns were coupled with Vickers M34 Vc fire-control mechanical computers.

=== Hungary ===
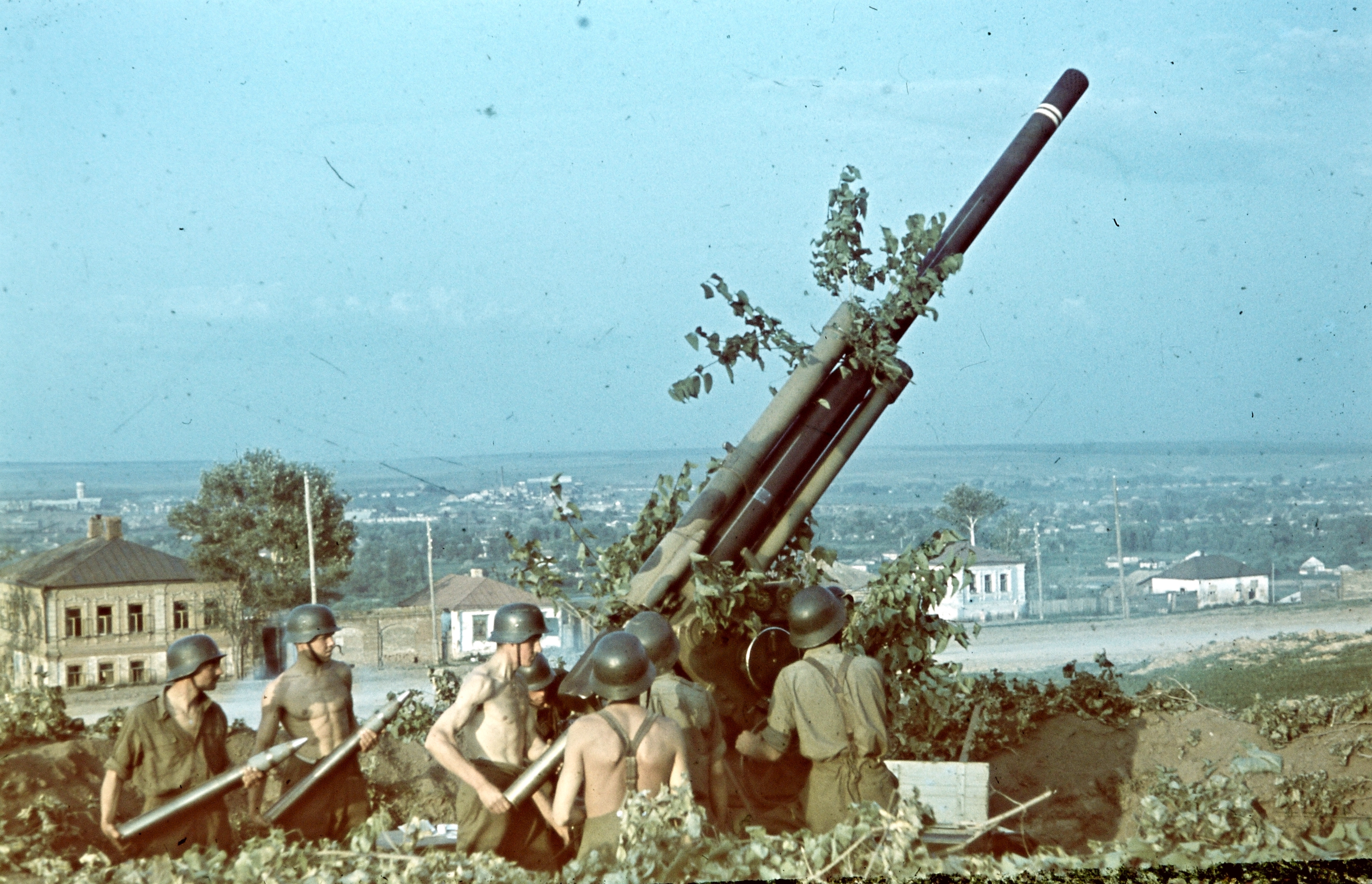
Hungarian 8-cm 29M in Russia, 1942

One of the largest batches of the gun were bought by Hungary (all in 80 mm variant), which successfully used it on the Eastern Front of World War II both in anti-aircraft and anti-tank role (under the designation of 8 cm 29M (Légvédelmi Ágyú)). György Szebeny also designed a version of the 40M Nimród self-propelled AA gun armed with the 80 mm Bofors instead of the original 40 mm gun, but it never went into production.

=== Other countries ===
In 1938 Persia bought 24 pieces of the luftvärnskanon m/37, intended for 6 batteries of 4 guns each. The outbreak of World War II prevented any further deliveries.

Greece ordered 80 mm variant and used it to reinforce the air defence of the Metaxas Line.

Between 1935 and 1938 the Royal Netherlands East Indies Army ordered 52 pieces of the luftvärnskanon m/37 gun in 80 mm L/50 variant. Out of those 36 were delivered, 12 on mobile cruciform platforms and the rest to be used on fixed positions. Most were delivered in parts and then assembled at Wilton-Fijenoord facilities. The Dutch East Indies forces used the guns to bolster the defence of key ports, notably eight pieces were protecting Soerabaja against the Japanese invasion.

== See also ==
- 8.8 cm Flak 18/36/37/41: German anti-aircraft gun based on the Bofors Model 1929.
