= 7.5 cm Flak. L/60 =

- Type: Anti-aircraft gun
- Place of origin: Sweden

Service history
- Used by: Nazi Germany; Brazil; Spain
- Wars: World War II

Production history
- Designer: Bofors; Krupp
- Designed: 1928
- Manufacturer: Krupp

Specifications
- Mass: 5,200 kg (11,500 lb)
- Barrel length: 4.5 m (14 ft 9 in) L/60
- Shell: 75 x 604 mm R
- Shell weight: 6.3 kg (13 lb 14 oz)
- Caliber: 7.5 cm (3.0 in)
- Breech: Horizontal semi-automatic sliding-wedge
- Recoil: Hydro-pneumatic
- Carriage: 4 wheel dual axle carriage with cruciform outriggers
- Elevation: -5° to +85°
- Traverse: 360°
- Rate of fire: 25 rpm (cyclic); 15 rpm (practical)
- Muzzle velocity: 850 m/s (2,800 ft/s)
- Effective firing range: 9 km (30,000 ft) AA ceiling
- Maximum firing range: 14.2 km (8.8 mi) horizontal

The 7.5 cm Flak. L/60 was a German anti-aircraft gun built during the 1930s and used by Germany in limited numbers during the Second World War. Although not produced in great numbers its features were further developed in the 8.8 cm Flak 18/36/37/41 series of guns.

== History ==
After the defeat of the Central Powers in World War I Germany faced a prohibition on new weapons development imposed by the Versailles treaty. However, Krupp sidestepped these restrictions by opening foreign subsidiaries or by entering into joint-development agreements with companies such as Bofors to develop a new anti-aircraft gun. The development of the gun was secretly funded by the Reichswehr and in 1925 Krupp acquired a controlling interest in Bofors and a team of German experts was sent to Sweden.

The resulting gun the Bofors 75 mm Model 1929 proved adequate for the Swedes, but trials of 7.5 cm Flak. L/60 proved unsatisfactory and the Germans requested a heavier design. The 75 mm was then modified to include a larger caliber barrel, which was further developed into the 8.8 cm Flak 18/36/37/41, one of the best-known AA guns of World War II.

Despite German unwillingness to buy the 75 mm variant, Bofors decided to start serial production anyway and the Bofors 75 mm Model 1929 proved an export success. Krupp also began production of the 7.5 cm Flak. L/60 for foreign customers such as Brazil and Spain. At the outbreak of war in 1939 undelivered guns were seized and assigned to the Kriegsmarine who employed them as coastal artillery and anti-aircraft guns.

== Bibliography ==
- Chris Bishop, ed. (2002). "8.8-cm Flak 18 and Flak 37". The Encyclopedia of Weapons of World War II. Sterling Publishing Company. p. 540. ISBN 9781586637620.
- (in German) Peter Chamberlain; Terry Gander (2006). Enzyklopädie deutscher Waffen: 1939 - 1945 [Encyclopaedia of German Arms: 1939-1945]. Motorbuch-Verlag spezial. transl. Herbert Jäger (2 ed.). Motorbuch-Verlag. p. 371. ISBN 9783613024816.
- James D. Crabtree (1994). On Air Defense. Military profession. Greenwood Publishing Group. p. 221. ISBN 9780275947927. ISSN 1074-2964.
- J. E. Kaufmann; Robert M. Jurga. Fortress Europe: European Fortifications Of World War II. Cambridge: Da Capo Press. ISBN 9780786749874.
- J. E. Kaufmann; H. W. Kaufmann (2007). Fortress Third Reich: German Fortifications and Defense Systems in World War II (reprint ed.). Cambridge: Da Capo Press. p. 369. ISBN 9780306816352.
- (in Polish) Stefan Pataj (1976). Artyleria lądowa: 1871-1970 [Land-based artillery, 1871-1970]. Warsaw: Wydawnictwa Ministerstwa Obrony Narodowej. p. 497.
