= M42 Duster =

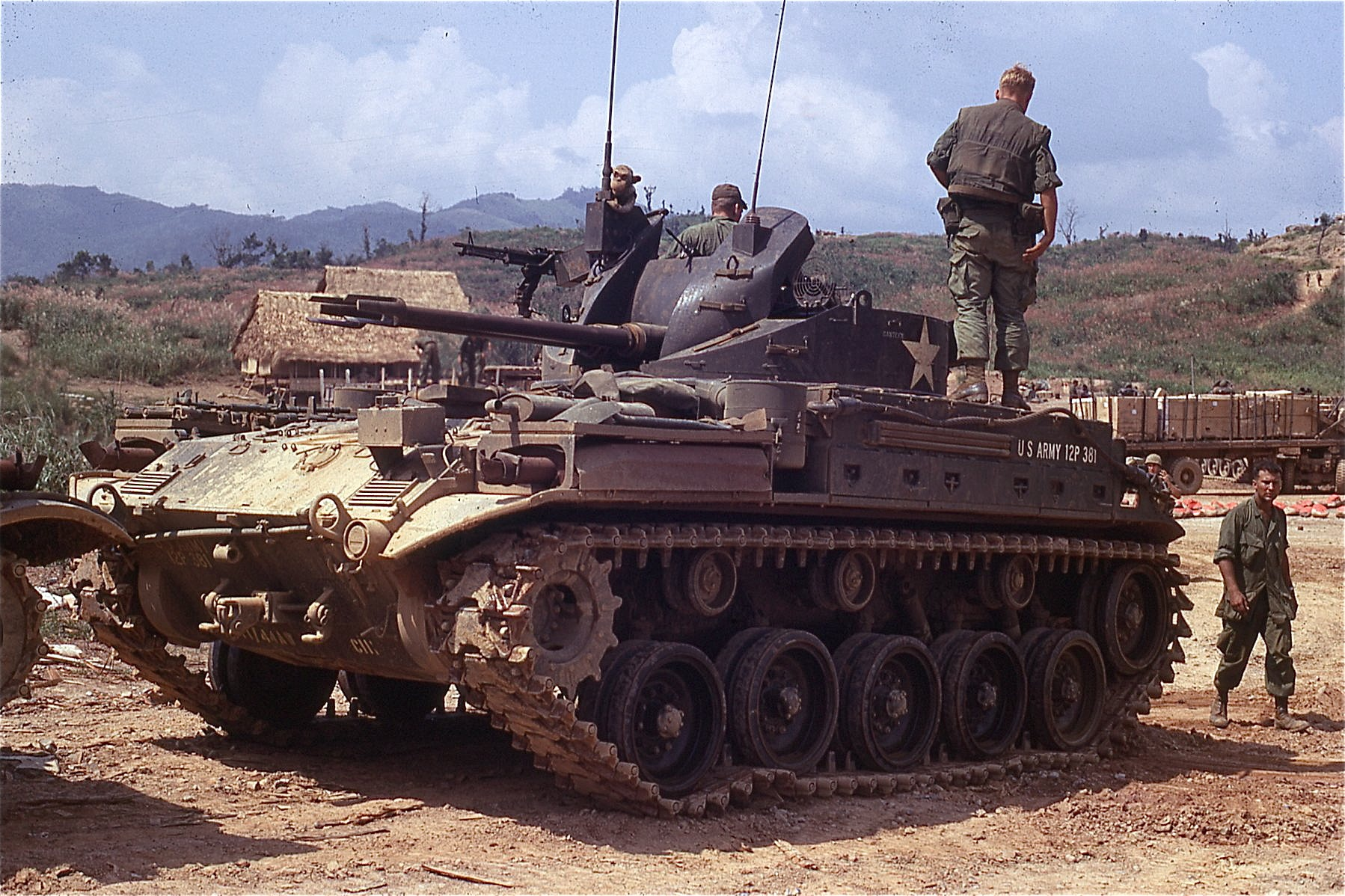
- An M42 Duster used for road security along Route 9, South Vietnam in 1968
- Type: Self-propelled anti-aircraft gun
- Place of origin: United States

Service history
- Wars: Vietnam War; Sino-Vietnamese War; Lebanese Civil War; 2025 Cambodian–Thai clashes

Production history
- Manufacturer: General Motors Corporation
- No. built: 3,700

Specifications
- Mass: 24.8 t (loaded)
- Length: 5.82 m (19 ft 1 in)
- Width: 3.23 m (10 ft 7 in)
- Height: 2.85 m (9 ft 4 in)
- Crew: 4–6
- Armor: 9–25 mm
- Main armament: M2A1 40 mm twin anti-aircraft gun with 336 rounds
- Secondary armament: 1 × M1919A4 7.62 mm machine gun or 7.62mm M60 machine gun
- Engine: 6-cylinder air-cooled gasoline 500 hp (375 kW)
- Power/weight: 22.2 hp/t
- Suspension: torsion bar
- Operational range: 160 km (99 mi)
- Maximum speed: 72 km/h (45 mph)

The M42 40 mm self-propelled anti-aircraft gun, or Duster, is an American armored light air-defense gun built for the United States Army from 1952 until December 1960, in service until 1988. Production of this vehicle was performed by the tank division of the General Motors Corporation. It used components from the M41 light tank and was constructed of all-welded steel.

A total of 3,700 M42s were built. The vehicle has a crew of six and weighs 22,500 kg (49,500 lb) fully loaded. Maximum speed is 45 mph (72 km/h) with a range of 100 miles (160 km). Armament consists of fully automatic twin 40 mm M2A1 Bofors, with a rate of fire of 2×120 rounds per minute (rpm) enabling nearly 85 seconds of fire time before running out of ammo, and either a .30 caliber Browning M1919A4 or 7.62mm M60 machine gun. The 500 hp, six-cylinder, Continental (or Lycoming Engines), air-cooled, gasoline engine is located in the rear of the vehicle. It was driven by a cross-drive, two-speed Allison transmission.

Although the M42 was initially designed for an anti-aircraft role, it proved to be effective against unarmored ground forces in the Vietnam War, primarily against standard infantry.

== Development ==
During the course of the Korean War, the U.S. Army decided to phase out all vehicles based on the M24 Chaffee chassis, such as the M19 multiple gun motor carriage 40 mm anti-aircraft, in favor of designs that utilized the chassis of the M41. Since the 40 mm guns were still seen as an effective anti-aircraft weapon, a modified version of the gun mount used in the M19 was mounted in a redesigned turret to accommodate the larger turret ring of the M41 and designated as the M42.

The 40 mm guns were initially planned to be aimed with the assistance of a radar fire control system housed in a secondary vehicle of similar design but this idea was scrapped as development costs mounted.

== Service history ==
Production of the M42 began in early 1952 at GM's Cleveland Tank Plant. The U.S. Army started accepting delivery of the M42 in October 1952. It entered service in late 1953 and replaced a variety of different anti-aircraft systems in armored divisions. In 1956, the M42 received a new engine and other upgrades along with other M41 based vehicles, becoming the M42A1. Production was halted in December 1959 with 3,700 examples made during its production run, but it continued to be used in Army service until the early 1960s, when it was transferred to the Army National Guard.

Sometime in the late 50s, the U.S. Army reached the conclusion that anti-aircraft guns were no longer viable in the jet age and began fielding a self-propelled version of the HAWK SAM instead. Accordingly, the M42 was retired from front line service and passed to the National Guard with the last M42s leaving the regular Army by 1963, except for the 4th Battalion, 517th Air Defense Artillery Regiment in the Panama Canal Zone, which operated two batteries of M42s into the 1970s.

=== Vietnam War ===
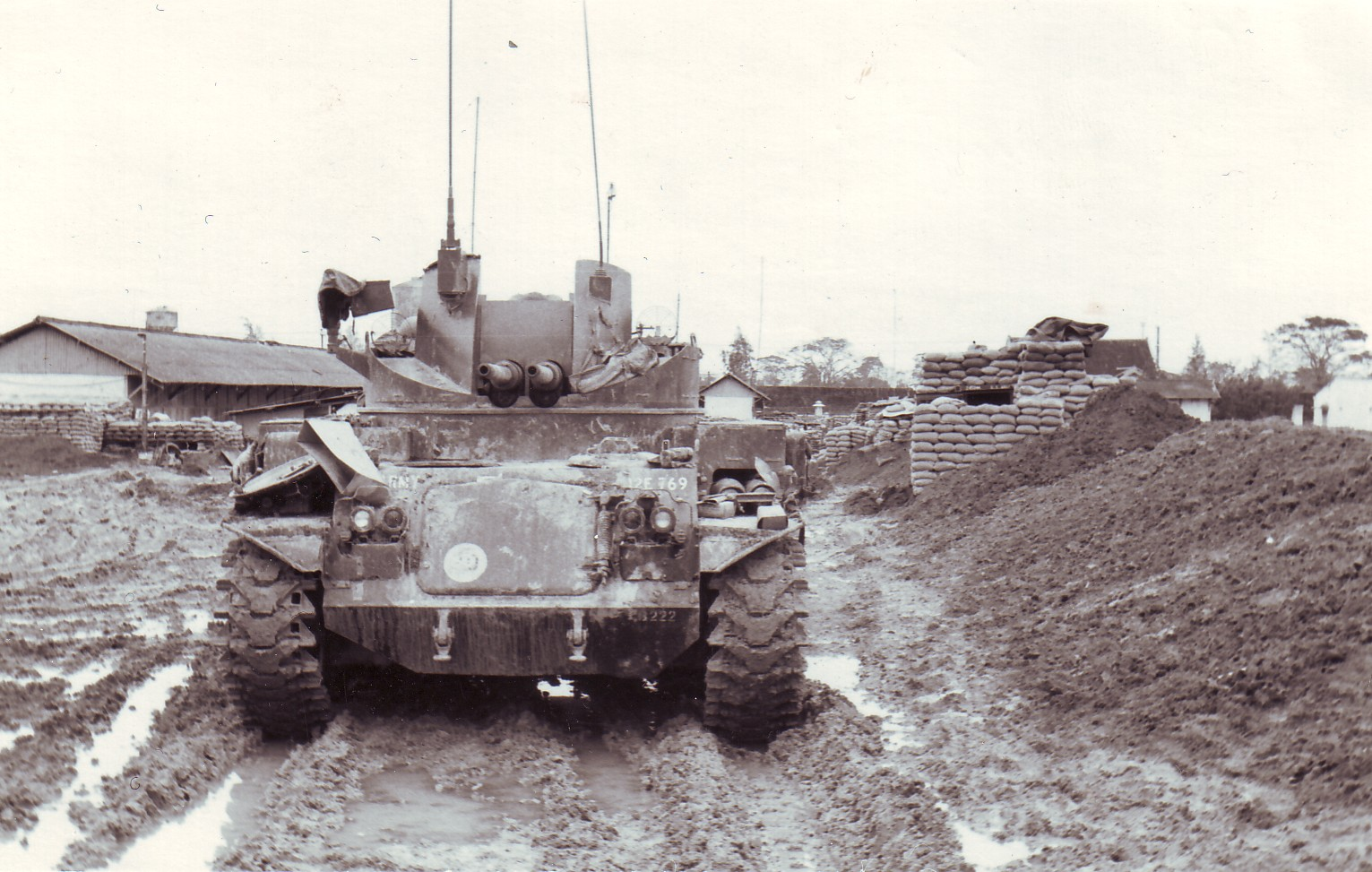
M42 Duster, MACV compound at Quảng Trị City, February 1968.

The HAWK missile system performed poorly in low altitude defense. To ensure some low altitude anti-aircraft capability for the ever-increasing amount of forces fielded in South Vietnam, the Army began recalling M42A1s back into active service and organizing them into air defense artillery (ADA) battalions. Starting in the fall of 1966, the U.S. Army deployed three battalions of Dusters to South Vietnam, each battalion consisting of a headquarters battery and four Duster batteries, each augmented by one attached Quad-50 battery and an artillery searchlight battery.

Despite a few early air kills, the air threat posed by North Vietnam never materialized and ADA crews found themselves increasingly involved in ground support missions. Most often the M42 was on point security, convoy escort, or perimeter defense. The Duster was soon found to excel in ground support. The 40 mm guns proved to be effective against massed infantry attacks. According to an article that appeared in Vietnam Magazine:

M-55s and M-42s were old pieces of equipment that needed a lot of maintenance and required hard-to-get spare parts. The gasoline-powered Dusters were particularly susceptible to fires in the engine compartment. Thus, despite its cross country capability, it was not wise to use the Duster in extended search and destroy operations in heavy jungle terrain because of excessive wear on engines, transmissions, and suspensions.

On the plus side, the Duster was essentially a fairly simple piece of machinery on which the crews could perform maintenance. Better yet, the Duster's high ground clearance and excellent suspension-system design gave it an ability to withstand land mine explosions with minimal crew casualties.

Although the Duster's 40mm shell had a terrific blast and fragmentation effect, it also had a highly sensitive point-detonating fuse that limited effectiveness in heavy vegetation. Under those conditions, the better weapon was the Quad, because the heavy .50-caliber projectile could easily punch through cover that would detonate the Duster's 40mm shell too early for it to be effective. At long ranges, however the 40mm shell was far more useful, particularly against field formations. The Duster also was able to deliver indirect fires by using data from field artillery fire-directions centers.

Soldiers of the 1-44th Artillery and their Marine counterparts in I Corps set the pattern of Quad and Duster operations. Because of an early scarcity of armored-combat vehicles, M-42s were first used as armor. Often thankful men quickly learned the value of high volumes of 40mm and .50-caliber fire, both in the field and perimeter defenses. Quads beefed up the defenses of remote fire bases, while Dusters accompanied both supply and tactical convoys along contested highways to break up ambushes. Dusters of Battery C, 1-44th Artillery, led the task force of Operations Pegasus that broke the siege of Khe Sanh in April 1968. Dusters and Quads provided critical final-protective fires throughout Vietnam during the Tet offensive and later took part in Operation Lam Son 719. Whenever fire support was needed, M-42s and M-55s could be found.

==== Units ====
Most of the Duster crew members had their AIT training in the 1st Advanced Individual Training Brigade (Air Defense) at Fort Bliss, Texas. Some of the Duster NCOs had received training at the Non Commissioned Officers Candidate School which was also held at Fort Bliss, Texas.

The 1st Battalion, 44th Artillery was the first ADA battalion to arrive in South Vietnam in November 1966. A self-propelled M42A1 Duster unit, the 1-44th supported the Marines at places like Con Thien and Khe Sanh Combat Base as well as Army divisions in South Vietnam's rugged I Corps region. The battalion was assigned to I Field Force, Vietnam and was located at Đông Hà. In 1968 it was attached to the 108th Artillery Group (Field Artillery). Attached to the 1-44th was G Battery 65th Air Defense Artillery equipped with Quad-50s and G Battery 29th Artillery Searchlights. The 1-44th served alongside the 3rd Marine Division along the Vietnamese Demilitarized Zone (DMZ) in I Corps thru December 1971. Sergeant Mitchell W. Stout, a member of C Battery, 1-44th Artillery was awarded the Medal of Honor.

The second Duster battalion to arrive in Vietnam was the 5th Battalion, 2nd Air Defense Artillery. Activated in June 1966 it arrived in Vietnam in November 1966 and was diverted to III Corps, II Field Force, Vietnam and set up around Bien Hoa Air Base. Attached units were D Battery71st Air Defense Artillery equipped with Quad-50s and I Battery, 29th Artillery Searchlights. The "Second First" served the southern Saigon region through mid 1971. D-71st Quads remained active through March 1972.

The third Duster battalion to arrive was the 4th Battalion, 60th Air Defense Artillery. Activated in June 1966 it arrived in Vietnam in June 1967 and set up operations in the Central Highlands, based out of An Khê (1967–70) and later Tuy Hoa (1970-71). Attached units were E Battery 41st Artillery equipped with Quad-50s and B Battery, 29th Artillery Searchlights (which were already in country since October 1965). Members of these units not only covered the entire Central Highlands, but also supported firebases and operations along the DMZ to the north and Saigon to the south.

Each Duster Battalion had four line batteries (A, B, C, D) and a headquarters battery. Each battery had two platoons (1st, 2nd), which contained four sections each with a pair of M42A1 Dusters. At full deployment there were roughly 200 M42 Dusters under command throughout the entire war. The Duster and Quads largely operated in pairs at firebases, strong points, and in support of engineers building roads and transportation groups protecting convoys. At night they protected the firebases from attack and were often the first targets of enemy sappers, rockets, and mortars. Searchlight jeeps operated singly but often in support of a Duster or Quad section at a firebase.

Between the three Duster battalions and the attached Quad-50 and Searchlight batteries over 200 fatalities were recorded.

=== Post Vietnam ===
The three M42A1 equipped ADA battalions (1-44th, 4-60th and 5-2d) deactivated and left Vietnam in late December 1971. Most if not all of the in-country Dusters were turned over to ARVN forces. Most of the training Dusters at Fort Bliss were returned to various National Guard units. The U.S. Army maintained multiple National Guard M42 battalions as a corps-level ADA asset. 2nd Battalion, 263rd Air Defense Artillery Regiment, headquartered in Anderson, SC was the last unit to operate the M42 when the system was retired in 1988.

=== Thai-Cambodia Clashes ===
On July 24, 2025, video evidence showed M42s being transported out of Bangkok, likely heading towards the frontline with Cambodia.

== Operators ==
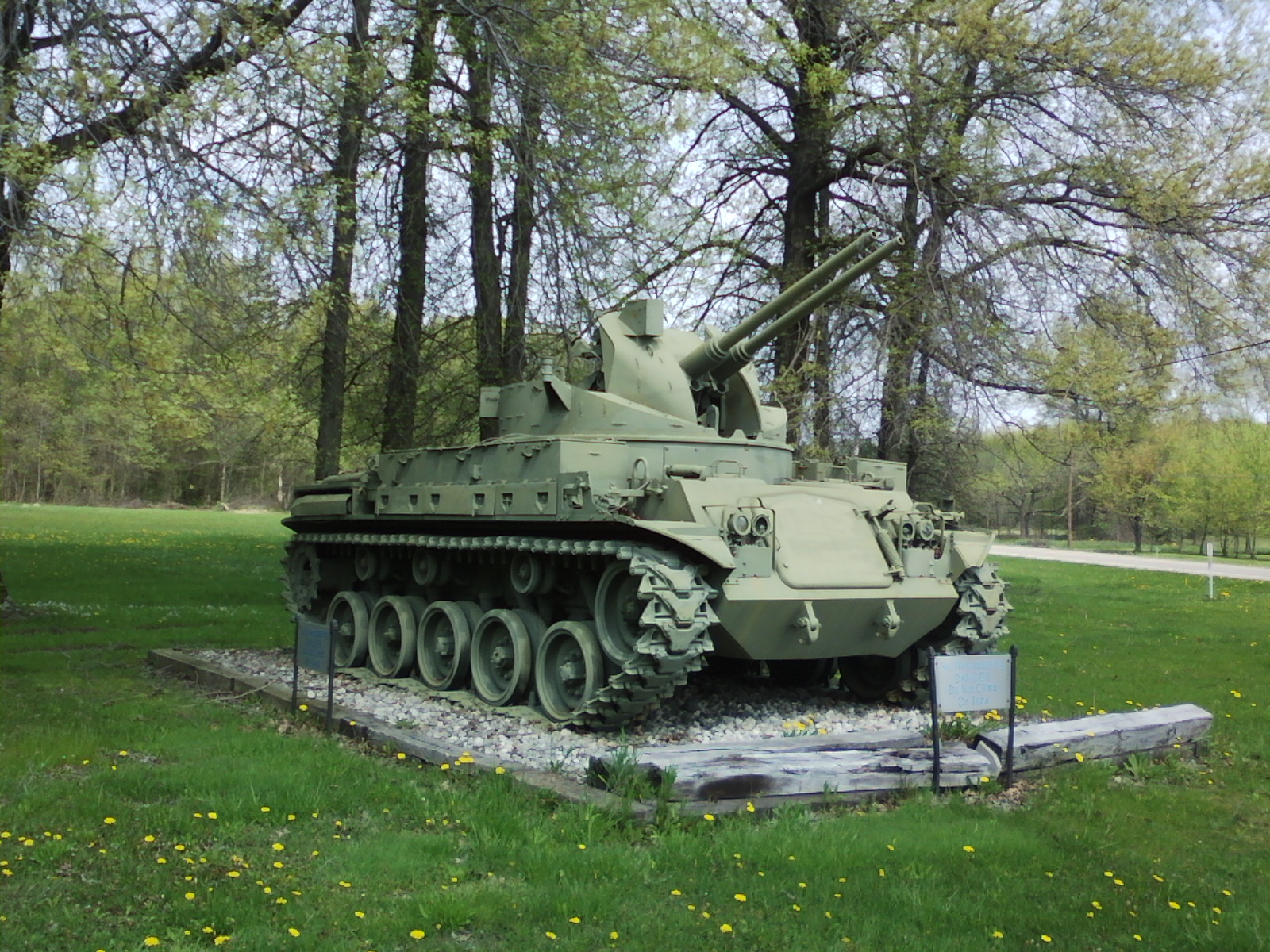
M42 on display at American Legion Post 713 Deerfield, Ohio.

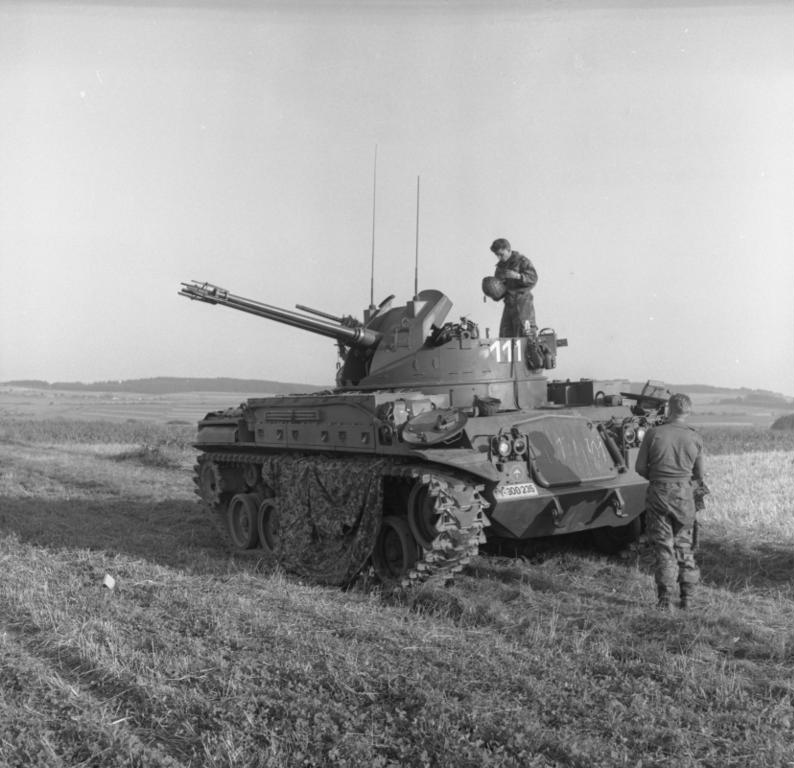
M42 used by German Bundeswehr.

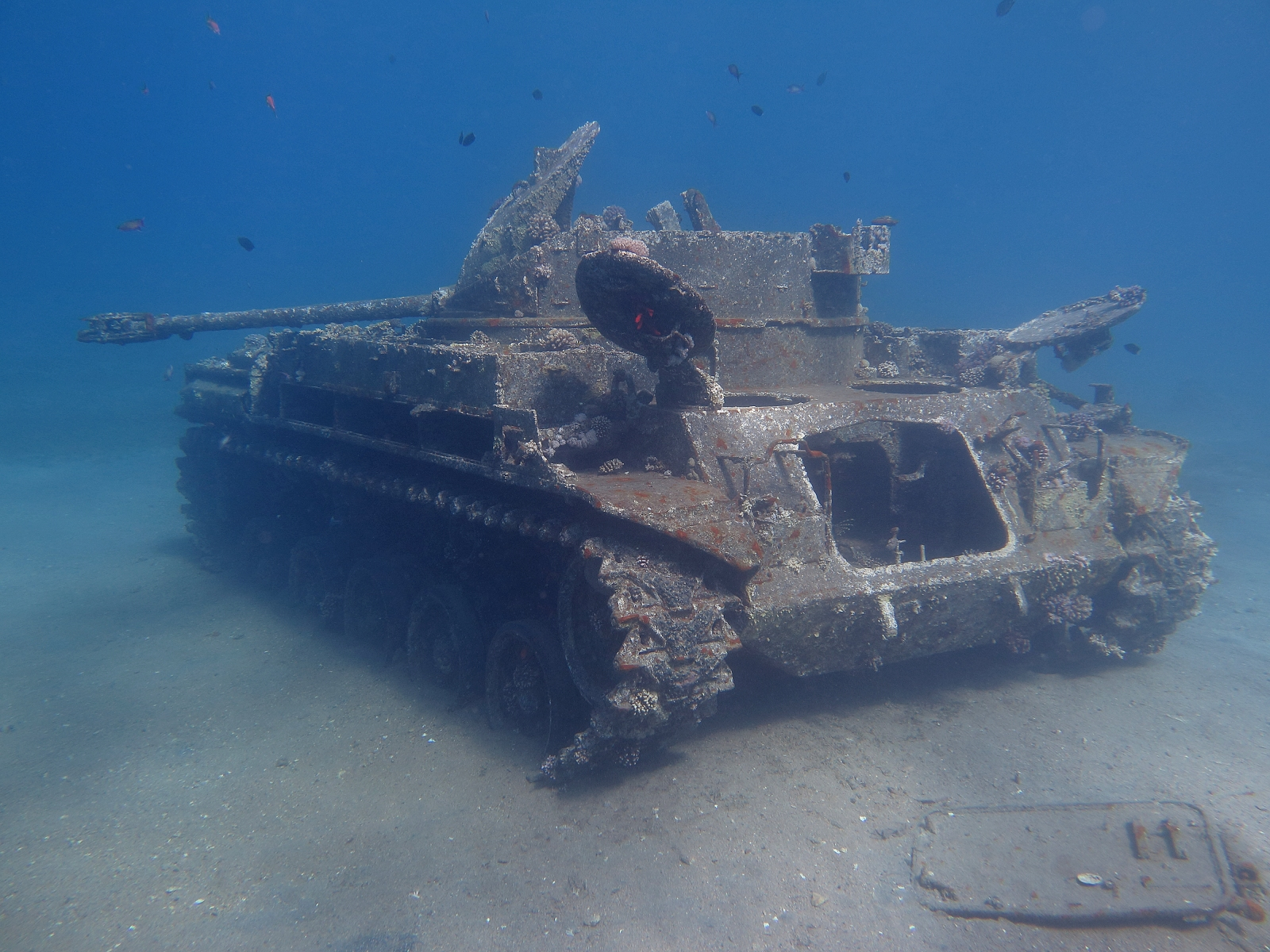
The sunken M42 in the Gulf of Aqaba in December 2017

- Greece: Hellenic Army, from surplus West German stocks
- Taiwan: Republic of China Army, Republic of China Marine Corps
- Thailand: Royal Thai Army, notably used in the 2025 Cambodian–Thai clashes.
- Tunisia: 18 M42 Duster twin-mounted 40 mm self-propelled AAG
- Vietnam: Captured from South Vietnam, who had them after being transferred by the US to the South Vietnamese forces in 1973; was captured and inherited by the Liberation Army as well as the People's Army of Vietnam. All are being stored and in inactive reserve status.

=== Former operators ===
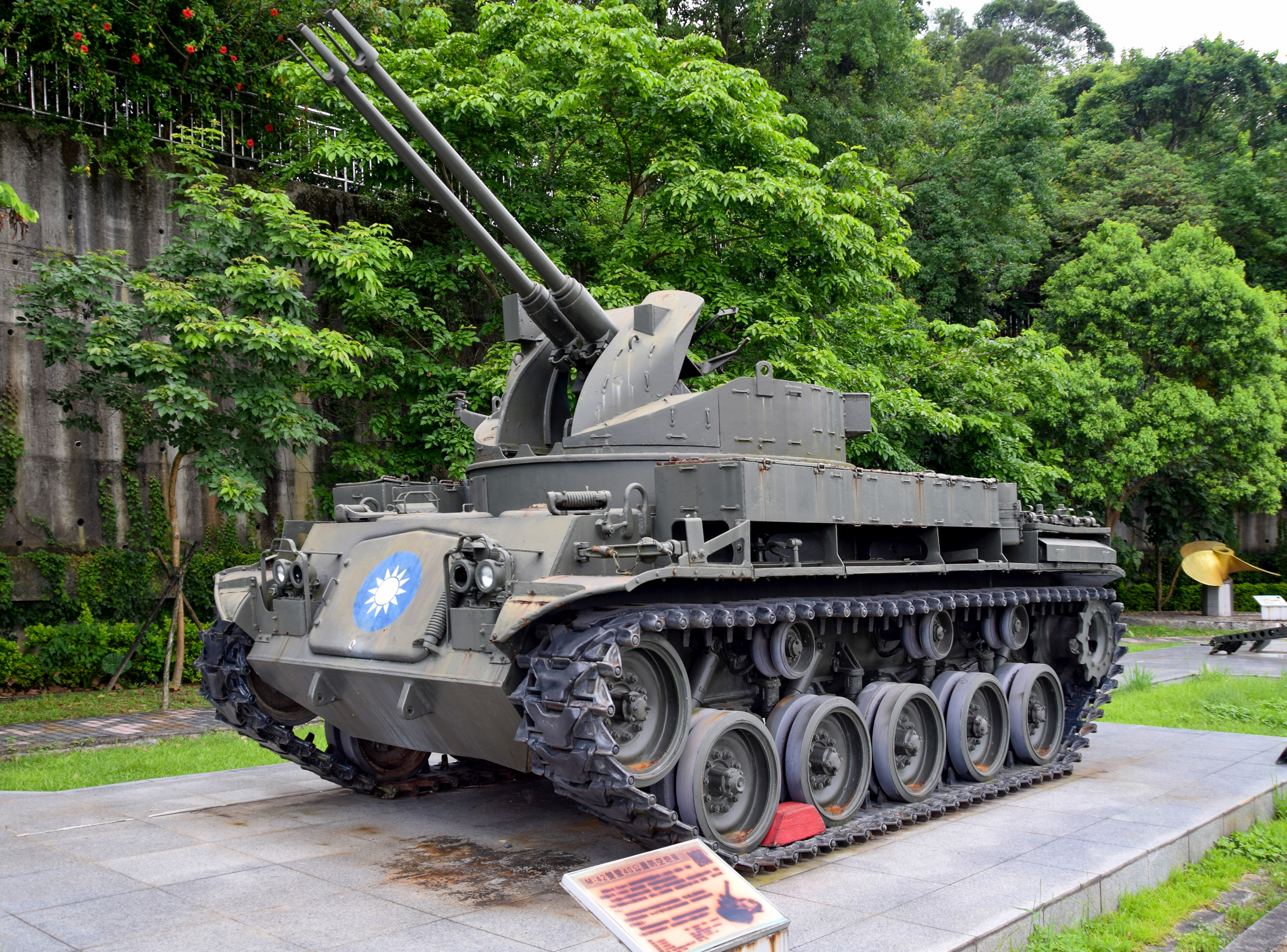
A former ROCA M42 Duster AA tank on display

- Austria: After the end of the Cold War, all 38 M42A1 Dusters were phased out in 1992.
- Japan: Japan Ground Self Defense Force, 22 M42A1 Dusters, retired from service in 1994.
- Jordan: Royal Jordanian Army, Phased out - One now sits on the sea bed in Aqaba, acting as a dive attraction and artificial reef.
- Lebanon: 15 M42A1 Dusters in service with the Lebanese Army (1958–1984).
- Pakistan: Pakistan Army, Phased out
- Kingdom of Greece / Greek junta
- West Germany: From 1956 on 496 M42 supplied to the air-defence battalion of the divisions, replaced by Flakpanzer Gepard SPAAG starting in 1976.
- Turkey: Replaced by a new ASELSAN 35mm Self Propelled Air Defense Gun (Korkut)
- United States: US Army, Army National Guard, United States Marine Corps, last units retired in 1988.
- Republic of Venezuela: Venezuelan Army, retired from service in 1989
- South Vietnam: Were delivered by the US to the South Vietnamese forces in 1973.
- North Vietnam: Captured from South Vietnam, who had them after being transferred by the US to the South Vietnamese forces in 1973; was captured and inherited by the Liberation Army as well as the People's Army of Vietnam

=== Non-state operators ===
- Army of Free Lebanon: 4 seized from Lebanese Army stocks.
- Al-Mourabitoun: Seized from Lebanese Army stocks.
- Guardians of the Cedars: Seized from Lebanese Army stocks.
- Kataeb Regulatory Forces: Seized from Lebanese Army stocks; passed on to the Lebanese Forces.
- Tigers Militia: Seized from Lebanese Army stocks.
- Lebanese Arab Army: Seized from Lebanese Army stocks.
- Lebanese Forces: Inherited from the Kataeb Regulatory Forces.
- People's Liberation Army (Lebanon): Seized from Lebanese Army stocks.

== Variants ==
- M42A1: received the AOSI-895-5 engine (500 hp).
- Type 64: Taiwanese light tank variant produced by combining turrets of decommissioned M18 tank destroyers with surplus M42 hulls. Compartments over the track guards for spare Bofors gun barrels were replaced with storage boxes of the stock M41 tank. One battalion worth (50+) of conversions were made.
- AMX-13/M41E1 Ráfaga: Venezuelan self-propelled AA gun variant produced by combining turrets of decommissioned M42A1 Dusters towers (M41E1) with surplus AMX-13M51 hulls, with improvements in fire control for night operations and on original chassis. One anti-aircraft battery worth of +/−10 conversions was made.
- GE Beetle

== See also ==
- G-numbers
- ZSU-57-2—Comparable Soviet self-propelled AA gun
- Type 63
