= 20 mm Tarasque =

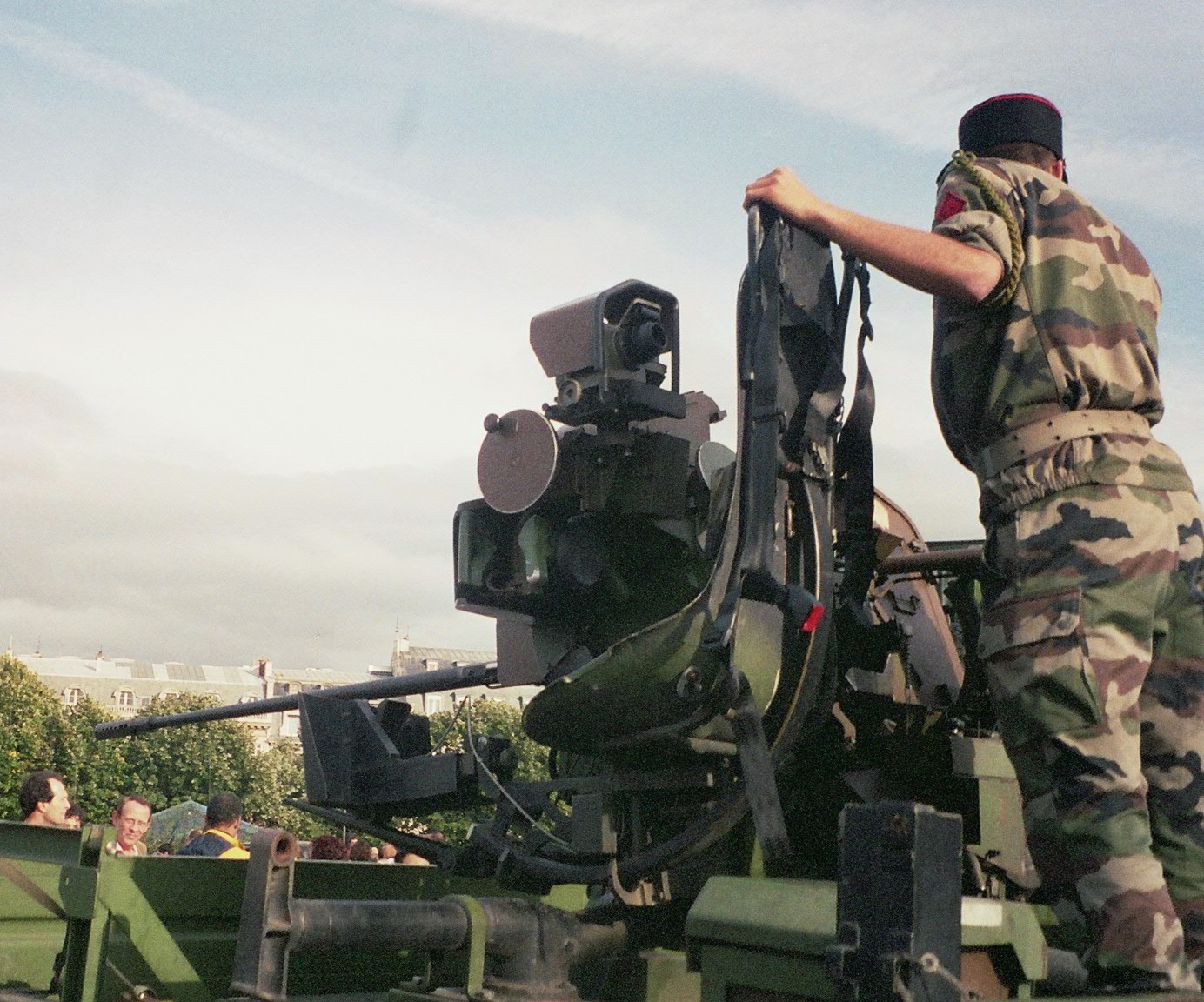
- National Defense days, Esplanade des Invalides, Paris, France, September 24-25, 2005
- Type: Anti-aircraft gun
- Place of origin: France

Service history
- Used by: France

Specifications
- Mass: Travel: 840 kg (1,850 lb); Combat: 650 kg (1,430 lb)
- Length: Travel: 4.30 m (14 ft 1 in)
- Barrel length: 2.065 m (6 ft 9 in)
- Width: Travel: 1.27 m (4 ft 2 in)
- Height: Travel: 1.47 m (4 ft 10 in)
- Crew: 6
- Shell: HE/I; 125 g (4.4 oz)
- Caliber: 20 mm (0.79 in)
- Barrels: 1
- Action: Gas-operated reloading
- Elevation: -8 degrees to +83
- Traverse: 360 degrees
- Rate of fire: 740 rpm (cyclic)
- Muzzle velocity: 1,050 m/s (3,400 ft/s)
- Effective firing range: Horizontal: 2,500 m (8,200 ft); Vertical: 2,000 m (6,600 ft)
- Maximum firing range: Horizontal: 6,000 m (20,000 ft); Vertical: 4,500 m (14,800 ft)

The Tarasque Type 53 T2 is a 20 mm anti-aircraft gun adopted by the French Army. The Tarasque is based on the M693 F2 20 mm auto-cannon and mounted on a light two-wheeled trailer that can be towed by a jeep and brought into action in only 20 seconds. The Tarasque can be used against both aerial and ground targets and there is a 5× magnification telescopic sight for use against ground targets and a 1× magnification sight for anti-aircraft use. The Tarasque carriage is powered by an auxiliary hydraulic pump which provides power for both traverse and elevation. As a backup the Tarasque can also be powered manually if the hydraulic system fails.
