= 3.7 cm SockelFlak L/14.5 =

WW1-era German light anti-aircraft gun

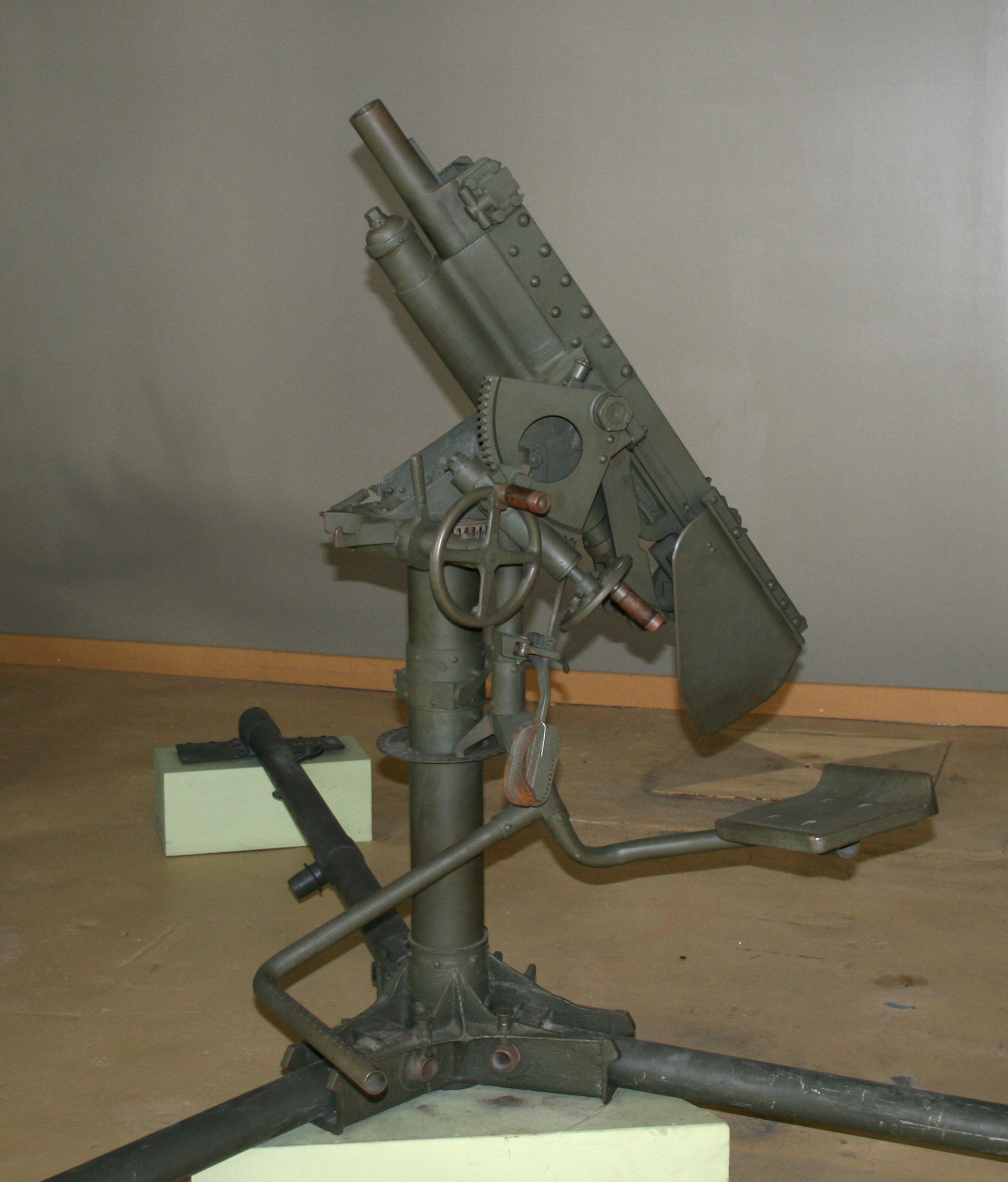
- A 3.7 cm SockelFlak L/14.5 gun at the Musée Royal de l'Armée, Belgium.
- Type: Anti-aircraft gun
- Place of origin: German Empire

Service history
- Used by: German Empire
- Wars: World War I

Production history
- Designer: Krupp
- Designed: 1917
- Manufacturer: Krupp
- Produced: 1917
- No. built: 150

Specifications
- Mass: Transport: 670 kg (1,480 lb); Combat: 215 kg (474 lb)
- Barrel length: 97 cm (3 ft 2 in) L/14.5
- Shell: Fixed QF 37 x 101 SR
- Shell weight: .45 kg (1 lb)
- Caliber: 37 mm (1.5 in)
- Action: Gas-operated semi-automatic
- Carriage: Tripod
- Elevation: -5° to +80°
- Traverse: 360°
- Rate of fire: 120 rpm cyclic
- Muzzle velocity: 350 m/s (1,100 ft/s)
- Effective firing range: Horizontal: 5 km (3 mi)
- Maximum firing range: Vertical: 2,200 m (7,200 ft)

The 3.7 cm SockelFlak L/14.5 was an early German light anti-aircraft gun deployed in limited numbers towards the end of the First World War.

== History ==
The SockelFlak started life as defensive armament for Zeppelin airships against fighter attack. However, once defenders discovered that airships filled with hydrogen were vulnerable to machine guns firing tracer ammunition Zeppelin losses mounted and the Germans switched to less vulnerable bomber aircraft. This meant that the SockelFlak needed to find a new role.

As the threat posed by ground attack aircraft increased the need for specialized anti-aircraft guns also increased. At first, all of the combatants employed heavy machine guns and light field guns on improvised anti-aircraft mounts to combat reconnaissance and ground attack aircraft. Heavy machine guns were often placed on improvised pedestal mounts while light field guns were typically propped up on earthen embankments or scaffolds to point the muzzle pointed skyward. A heavy machine gun was capable of shooting down an attacking aircraft but the amount of time on target was brief and the probability of scoring a killing blow with rifle caliber rounds wasn't that great. While a medium caliber anti-aircraft gun 75–88 mm (3.0–3.5 in) was capable of destroying an attacking aircraft with one shot, its slow rate of fire combined with its slow elevation and traverse limited its usefulness against small fast moving targets at short range. Instead, the niche for medium caliber anti-aircraft guns was as a barrage weapon firing timed explosives at distant targets. What was needed was a fast firing, mobile, and easy to wield weapon which could fire a small explosive round to destroy an attacking aircraft with a few well-placed shots. It was under these conditions that the SockelFlak was redesigned to fulfill the light anti-aircraft role.

== Design ==
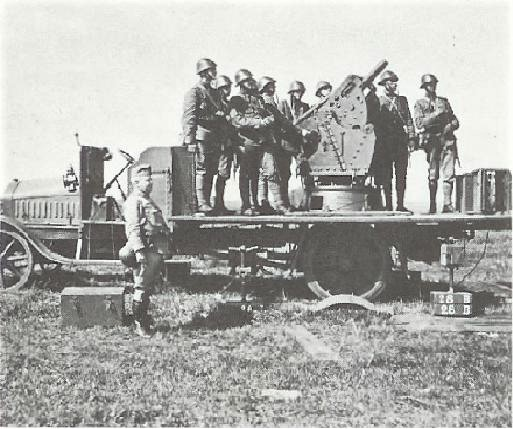
A Dutch mobile anti-aircraft gun during World War II. These mobile anti-aircraft guns were sold to the Dutch after the German defeat in World War I.

The SockelFlak was a gas-operated automatic cannon which fired a 37 mm (1.5 in) steel base fused explosive round with two brass driving bands. The gun was mounted on a light three-legged pedestal mount with a seat for the gunner and could be broken down into four loads for short-range transport or carried in one piece on a cart by a two-horse team for longer trips. There were two spade grips for aiming and the gun was fired by a trigger operated by the gunner's knee while seated. Since the gun wasn't originally meant for field use it was prone to stoppages due to dust and dirt. It had a cyclic rate of fire of 120 rounds per minute but its top loaded 10 round clip was slow to change, which meant that although easy to wield it had a limited time on target and slow practical rate of fire. The first 20 guns were delivered in December 1917 and by the time of the armistice, there were 150 in service.
