= Type 63/65 self-propelled anti-aircraft gun =

Self-propelled anti-aircraft gun based on T-34 tank

~Type 63/65
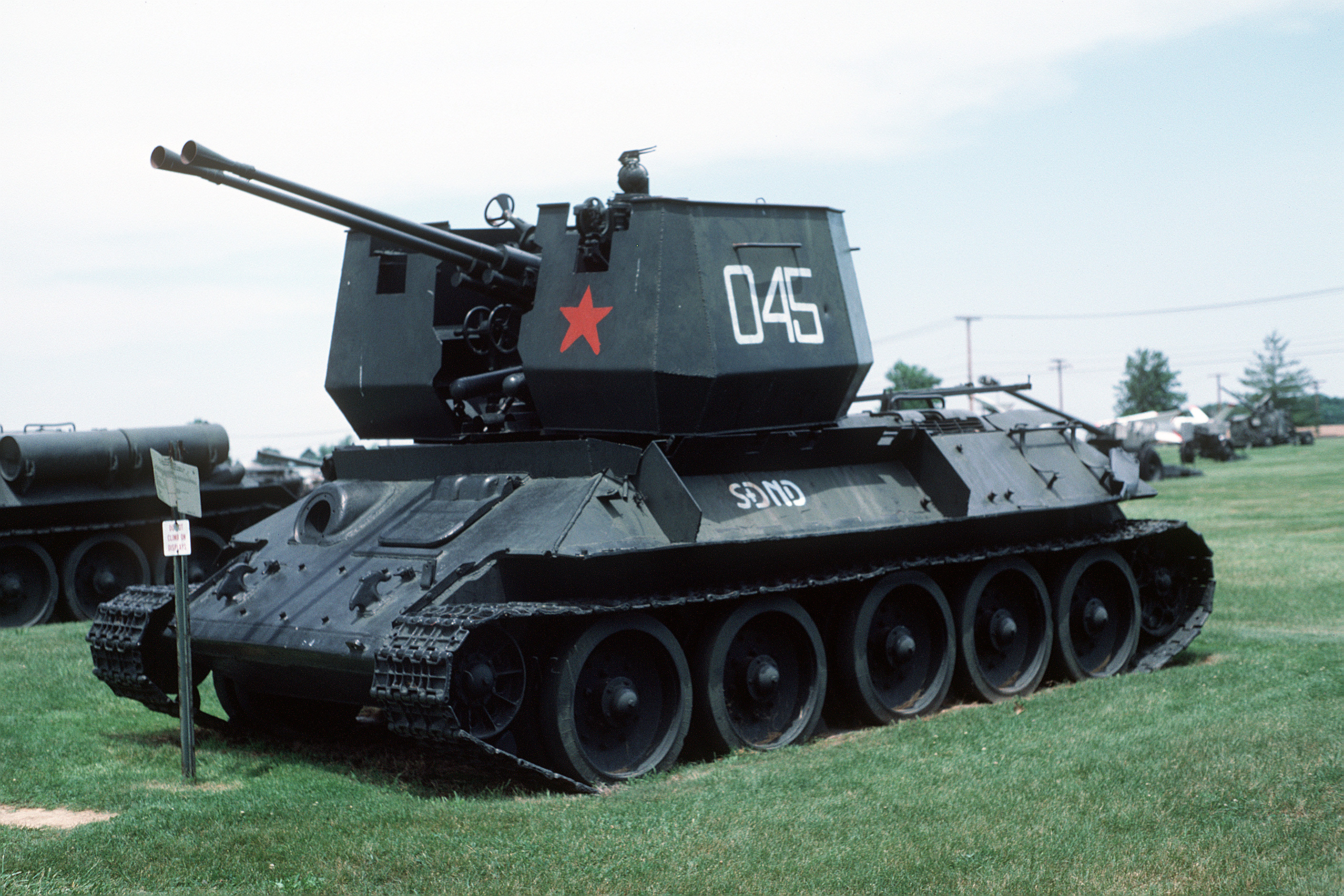
- A Type 65 on display at the U.S. Army Aberdeen Proving Grounds
- Type: Self-propelled anti-aircraft gun
- Place of origin: Vietnam

Service history
- Wars: Vietnam War

Specifications
- Mass: 32 tonnes (35.2 tons)
- Length: 6.432 metres (21 feet 1.2 inches)
- Width: 2.99 metres (9 feet 10 inches)
- Height: 2.99 metres (9 feet 10 inches)
- Crew: 6
- Armor: 18–45 mm (0.71–1.77 in)
- Main armament: Type 65 37 mm (1.5 in) anti-aircraft gun
- Engine: V-2-34 Diesel engine 500 hp (370 kW)
- Power/weight: 18.1 hp/tonne (13.5 kW/tonne)
- Suspension: Christie
- Operational range: 300 km (190 mi)
- Maximum speed: Road: 55 km/h (34 mph)

The Type 65 or Type 63 are popular unofficial names given to an unnamed Vietnamese improvised self-propelled anti-aircraft gun mounting a Chinese twin-barrelled 37 mm Type 65 anti-aircraft gun onto a Soviet T-34-85 medium tank chassis.

== Etymology ==
The vehicle has no known official name. The name Type 65 derive directly from the Chinese-supplied gun system.

The earliest known reference to the name "Type 63" comes from the book "A Compendium of Armaments and Military Hardware" by Christopher Chant (1987). It may derive from mispellings of Type 65 or conflation with other Chinese systems like the unrelated Type 63 AFV.

== Description ==
The Type 63/65 is based on a T-34-85 hull produced by UTZ 183 (Uralsky Tankovij Zavod). The turret was removed and replaced by a Chinese-supplied dual 37 mm Type 65 anti-aircraft gun carriage in an open-top box turret. The guns were loaded manually with 5-round clips.

While the Type 63/65 firepower was on par with contemporary anti-aircraft systems, such as the M42 Duster, due to the lack of hydraulic elevation systems, the guns had to be elevated manually. Because of this, the Type 63/65 was ineffective against fast moving, low flying aircraft, and while it proved somewhat effective in the ground support anti-armour role, it was ineffective against then-modern main battle tank armour of the Vietnam War.

=== Construction ===
The modification was crudely made, with basic materials. The T-34/85 hull had its turret removed and the turret ring was bolted over with a steel plate using 27 bolts. The plate was reinforced with a vertical steel beam welded to the hull floor and the bottom of the roof plate. A 37 mm Type 65 twin-barrels anti-aircraft gun was removed from its 4-wheeled carriage and it's traversing gearbox was bolted to the middle of the steel plate. A turret was made from welded sheet metal and bolted to the floor of the anti aircraft gun mount. The only ammunition stowage was two metal bins, one located on each side of the outside of the hull. A travel lock made from channel iron is located on the engine deck of the tank.

== Service history ==
The Type 63/65 was part of a series of SPAAGs improvised by the NVA during the Vietnam War. The NVA was supplied with T-34-85 tanks and SU-76:s from Soviet Union and used them during the Vietnam War. These vehicles were proven inadequate in the later years of the war, so they were converted into self-propelled anti-aircraft guns due to a need for anti-aircraft equipment. It unknown how many conversion were made or when they were retired from service in People's Army of Vietnam.

The only known Type 63/65 was captured by the ARVN 4th Infantry Regiment during the 1972 Easter Offensive. This vehicle was turned over to the United States military and shipped to Bayonne, New Jersey in the Summer of 1975. From there it was shipped to Aberdeen Proving Ground where it was evaluated. It was placed on display at the Aberdeen Proving Grounds where it remained until the early 2010s, when it was transferred to the Air Defense Artillery Museum in Fort Sill, Oklahoma.

This vehicle had the number "045" painted on at least the left turret panel (presumably on both sides of the turret), which suggests there may have been more examples manufactured, but no other vehicles are currently known. Similar Vietnamese SPAAGs exist, including a T-34 hull with a 57 mm AZP S-60 anti-aircraft gun mounted in turret with a similar design, also missing the hull machine gun.

== Myths ==
Akin to its name, there are a lot of myths regarding the vehicle. One of the most infamous myths claims it is of Chinese manufacture.

Many sources state that the armament are paired "Type 63" anti-aircraft guns, however, the no such gun exist. The Chinese Type 65 is a twin-barreled system from the start.

== Operators ==
- North Vietnam - A single vehicle was made and later captured by ARVN during 1972 Easter Offensive.
- South Vietnam - At least one captured from the Vietnamese People's Army. This single vehicle was later shipped to Aberdeen Proving Ground where it was evaluated.

== Bibliography ==
- Hogg, Ian (2000). Twentieth-Century Artillery. Friedman/Fairfax Publishers. ISBN 1-58663-299-X.
- Dougherty, Martin J. (2007). The World's Worst Weapons. Amber Books Ltd. ISBN 978-1-905704-36-1.
