= Congregation B'nai Jacob (Woodbridge, Connecticut) =

Conservative synagogue in Woodbridge, Connecticut, US

- Location in Connecticut

Religion
- Affiliation: Conservative Judaism
- Ecclesiastical or organizational status: Synagogue
- Leadership: Rabbi Rona Shapiro
- Status: Active
- Notable artwork: Jean-Jacques Duval stained-glass windows

Location
- Location: 75 Rimmon Road, Woodbridge, Connecticut 06525
- Country: United States
- Interactive map of Congregation B'nai Jacob
- Coordinates: 41°20′18″N 73°00′11″W

Architecture
- Architects: Fritz Nathan; Bertram Bassuk
- Type: Synagogue architecture
- Style: Modernist
- Established: 1882 (as a congregation)
- Completed: 1961

Website
- bnaijacob.org

The Congregation B'nai Jacob (transliterated from Hebrew as "Sons of Jacob") is a Conservative Jewish congregation and synagogue located at 75 Rimmon Road, in Woodbridge, Connecticut, in the United States.

== History ==
Congregation B'nai Jacob was established in New Haven in 1882. Founded by Orthodox Ashkenazi Jewish refugees fleeing pogroms in the Russian Empire, it was first on Temple Street in New Haven, then moved to George Street in 1912, in a building completed in the Moorish Revival style.

In 1961, the congregation moved to Woodbridge, following the construction of a new synagogue designed by Fritz Nathan and Bertram Bassuk in the Modernist style. A defining feature of the sanctuary is an impressive display of stained-glass windows by Jean-Jacques Duval.

"Duval’s greatest success ... was his ability to create full walls of stained glass that actually helped emphasize and strengthen the shape of the space instead of distracting from it. Duval has demonstrated this talent for making architectural walls that complemented the architecture design in many synagogue and church commissions. Most of his stained glass windows are not to be seen through, or even to be looked at as pictures. Rather, they enclose the viewer to create a container of worship space."

— Samuel D. Gruber, Jewish art historian, 2011.

Rona Shapiro was appointed the congregation's first female rabbi in 2013.

== Notable members ==
- Josh Zeid, American-Israeli baseball player
