= Congregation Mishkan Israel =

Reform synagogue in Hamden, Connecticut, US

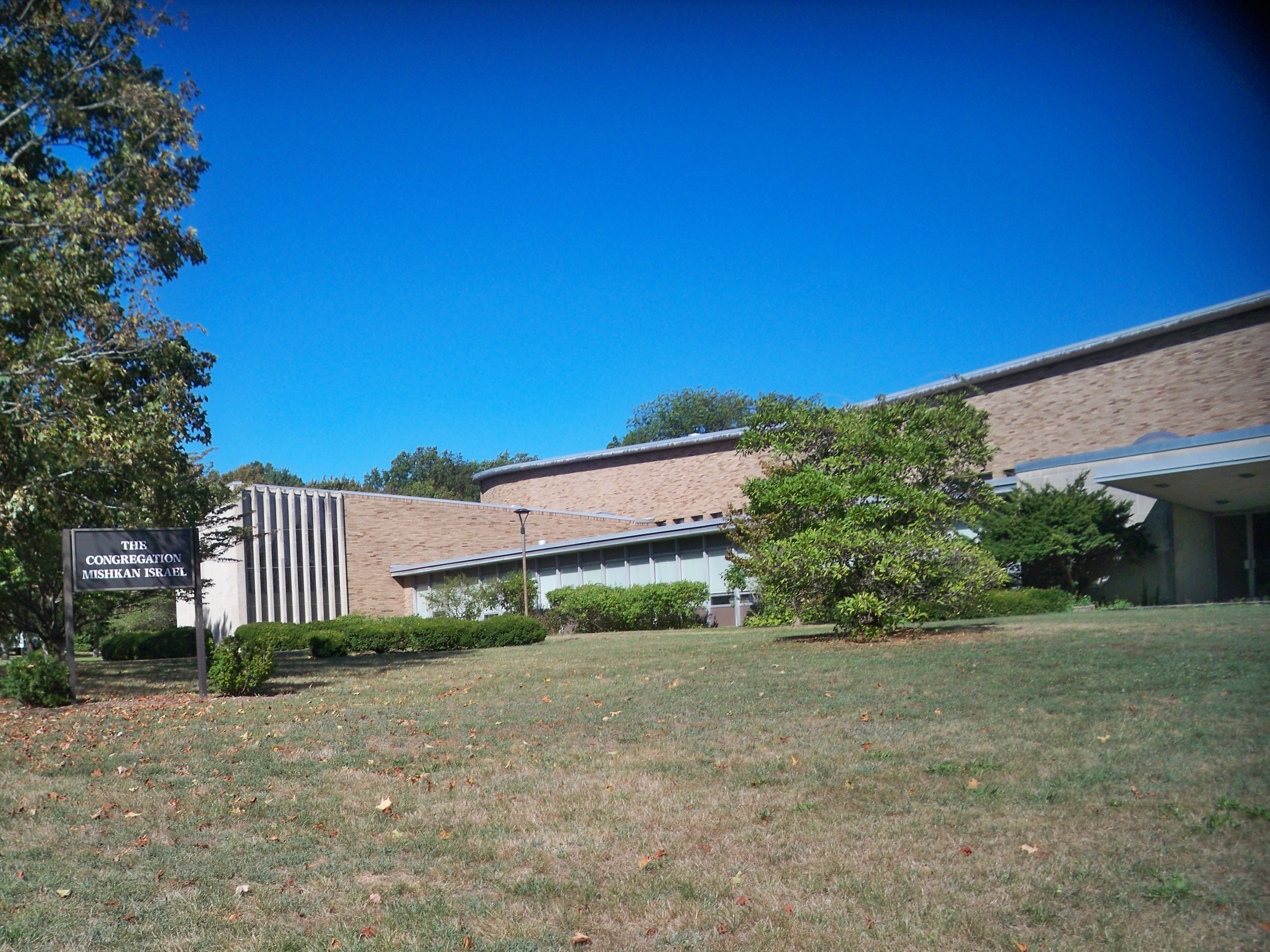
- Congregation Mishkan Israel

- Location in Connecticut

Religion
- Affiliation: Reform Judaism
- Ecclesiastical or organizational status: Synagogue
- Leadership: Rabbi Daniel Schaefer; Cantor Sierra Fox; Rabbi Herbert N. Brockman; (Emeritus)
- Status: Active
- Notable artworks: Jean-Jacques Duval stained-glass; Ben Shahn ark (1960)

Location
- Location: 785 Ridge Road, Hamden, Connecticut 06517
- Country: United States
- Interactive map of Congregation Mishkan Israel
- Coordinates: 41°21′23″N 72°54′04″W

Architecture
- Architects: 1897: Arnold W. Brunner; Thomas Tryon; 1960: Fritz Nathan
- Type: Synagogue
- Style: Moorish Revival (1897); Modernist (1960)
- General contractor: Mariani Construction Co. (1960)
- Established: 1840 (as a congregation)
- Completed: 1856 (Court Street); 1897 (Audubon Street); 1960 (Ridge Road)

Specifications
- Length: 330 feet (100 m) (1960)
- Width: 180 feet (55 m) (1960)
- Dome: Two (1897)
- Site area: 9.4 acres (3.8 ha) (1960)
- Materials: Red brick (1897); Limestone, brick, glass (1960)

Website
- cmihamden.org
- Temple Mishkan Israel (1897)
- U.S. Historic district – Contributing property
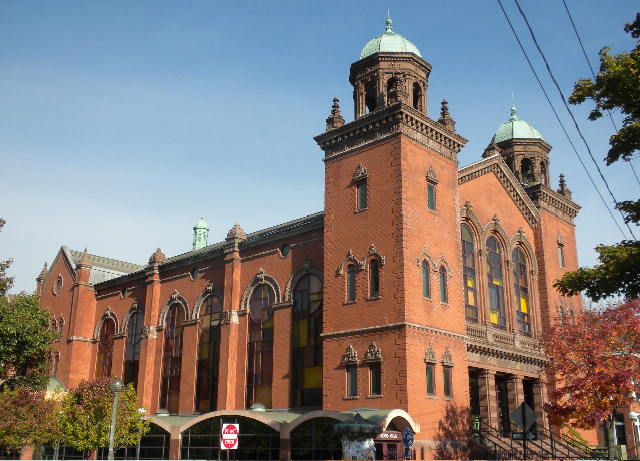
- Former 1897 synagogue, now arts high school
- Location: 55 Audubon Street, New Haven, CT
- Coordinates: 41°18′39″N 72°55′13″W
- Part of: Orange Street Historic District (ID85002314)
- Designated CP: September 12, 1985
- Temple Mishkan Israel (1960)
- U.S. National Register of Historic Places
- Location: 785 Ridge Road, Hamden
- NRHP reference No.: 100006598
- Added to NRHP: May 20, 2021

Congregation Mishkan Israel is a Reform Jewish congregation and synagogue, located at 785 Ridge Road, in Hamden, Connecticut, in the United States. Founded in 1840, it is the oldest Jewish congregation in both Connecticut and New England, and the 14th oldest continuous operating synagogue in the United States.

== History ==
The congregation was founded by 15 to 20 New Haven Jewish families, mostly from Bavaria, in 1840, when Jews were not allowed to form their own religious societies. These families took turns hosting services and event at their homes until the Connecticut Legislature, in 1843, enabled Jews to officially establish synagogues by allowing non-Christian organizations to incorporate in the state.

Mishkan Israel's first gatherings were held in a room above the Heller-Mendelbaum store at the corner of Grand and State Street in New Haven, Connecticut; reported in the local newspaper at the time:

Whilst we have been busy converting the Jews in other lands, they have outflanked us here, and effected a footing in the very centre of our own fortress.

— New Haven Register, May 26, 1843.

The congregation aligned with the Reform movement in 1856; and in the same year purchased the former Third Congregation Church, a Greek Revival church building on Court Street between State and Orange Street.

Its second synagogue building, built in 1897, was located, also in New Haven, at 55 Audubon Street, on the corner of Orange Street. Designed by Arnold W. Brunner and Thomas Tryon in the Moorish Revival style, the former synagogue building is a contributing property in the Orange Street Historic District, listed on the National Register of Historic Places on September 12, 1985. The building is notable for its twin façade domed-towers, ornately carved brownstone windows, and door trimmings. The building is now used as a performing arts space for ACES Educational Center for the Arts, a performing arts high school.

In 1960, the congregation moved to its current and third site, on Ridge Road in Hamden. The building was designed by German architect, Fritz Nathan in the Modernist style, and features stained-glass windows by Jean-Jacques Duval. This building was added to the National Register of Historic Places on May 20, 2021.

== Social activism ==
Mishkan Israel became a bastion of liberal religious thought and social activism in the 1950s and 1960s. Then Rabbi Robert E. Goldburg was an outspoken advocate for civil rights, and was arrested in a freedom march along with Martin Luther King and other clergy in 1964. Earlier, Dr. King had delivered a sermon at Mishkan Israel in 1961, helping to dedicate the new facility, which had relocated to Hamden. It is said to have been Dr. King's only preaching from a pulpit in the greater New Haven area.

Rabbi Goldburg stirred congregants’ passions with his strong and eloquent political voice raised frequently in support of racial justice and opposition to the Vietnam War. Dr. Daniel Ellsberg, Alger Hiss, Stokely Carmichael, and William Sloan Coffin were guest speakers at the behest of Rabbi Goldburg. Goldburg officiated at Marilyn Monroe's conversion to Judaism and at her Jewish wedding ceremony with Arthur Miller.

== Current leadership ==
Rabbi Daniel Schaefer, who grew up in the Mishkan Israel congregation and was ordained in 2018 by Hebrew College, has served as the rabbi since the summer of 2024. Before that, he was assistant rabbi at Temple Ohabei Shalom in Brookline, Massachusetts and the Interim Director for Jewish Life at Georgetown University. Rabbi Brian P. Immerman served as Mishkan Israel rabbi from 2018 to 2024. He succeeded Rabbi Herbert N. Brockman, now the emeritus, who had been the spiritual leader at Mishkan Israel for over 30 years. Rabbi Brockman taught and engages in community projects, and has been at the forefront of interfaith understanding and justice, not only in New Haven, but also nationally and internationally. The current cantor is Cantor Sierra Fox, who was ordained and received her Master of Sacred Music from Hebrew Union College. She succeeded Arthur Giglio, now emeritus, who held the position for 17 years.

The annual Martin Luther King Interfaith Service was inaugurated in 2010 by Rabbi Brockman as a tribute to Rabbi Goldburg and Martin Luther King's historic connection to Mishkan Israel.

The late peace activist Bruce M. Cohen served as rabbi of Mishkan Israel prior to founding Interns for Peace.

== Cemetery ==
The Mishkan Israel cemetery was created in 1843.

== See also ==
- Oldest synagogues in the United States
