= Mount Sinai Jewish Center =

Orthodox synagogue in Manhattan, New York

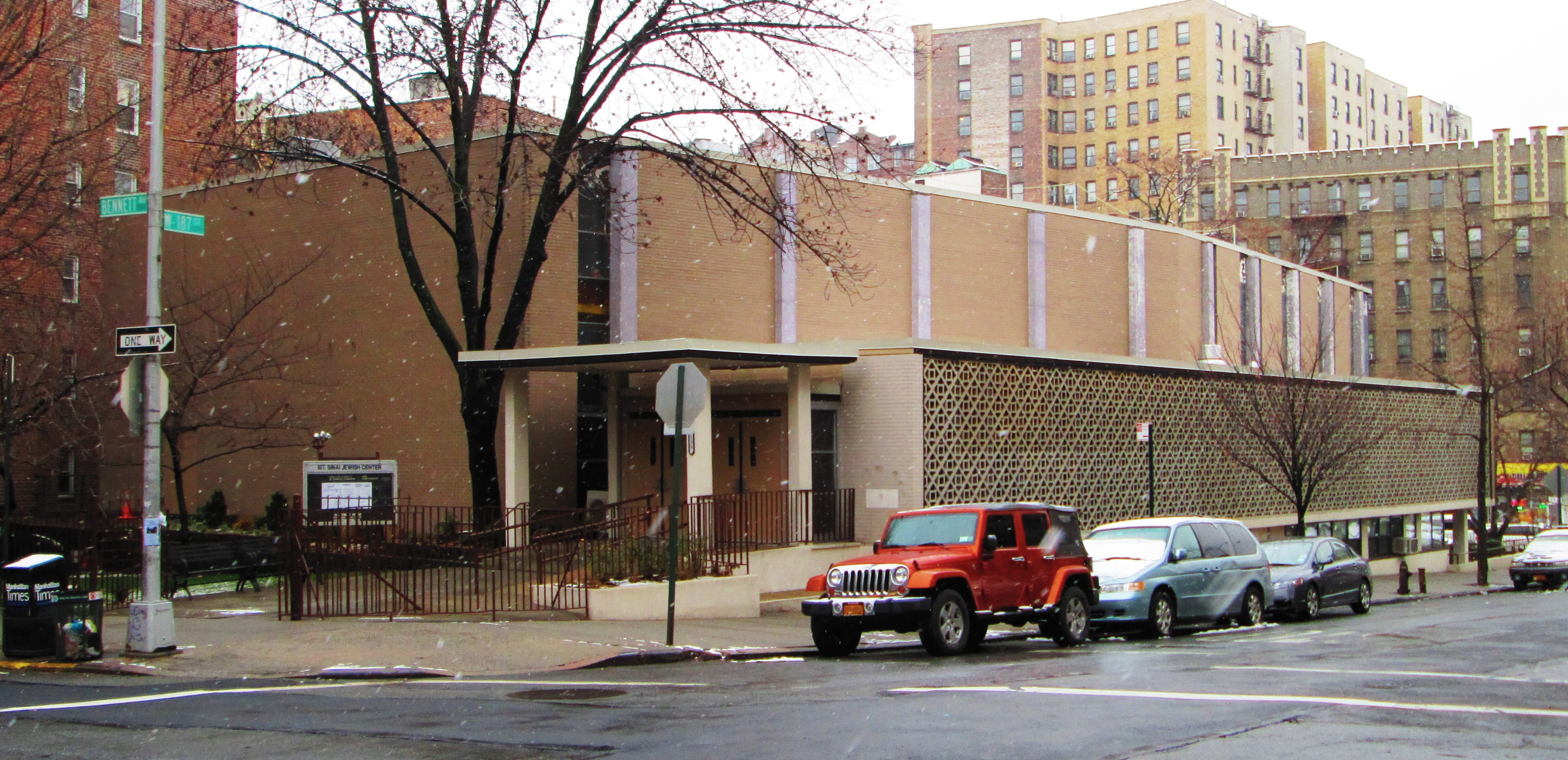
- Mount Sinai Jewish Center in 2013

- Location in New York City

Religion
- Affiliation: Modern Orthodox Judaism
- Rite: Ashkenazi
- Ecclesiastical or organizational status: Synagogue
- Leadership: Rabbi Yaakov Taubes
- Status: Active

Location
- Location: 135 Bennett Avenue, Washington Heights and Hudson Heights, Manhattan, New York 10040
- Country: United States
- Interactive map of Mount Sinai Jewish Center
- Coordinates: 40°51′16.15″N 73°56′2.76″W

Website
- mtsinaishul.com

The Mount Sinai Jewish Center is a Modern Orthodox Jewish congregation and synagogue that practices in the Ashkenazi rite, located in the Washington Heights and Hudson Heights neighborhood of Manhattan in New York City, New York, United States.

The building's main entrance is at 135 Bennett Avenue at the corner of 187th Street, and it spans the entire block to Broadway.

== History ==
The congregation is the successor to many "shuls" that have merged over the past 102 years. Its official title is Congregation Mount Sinai Anshe Emeth and Emes Wozedek of Washington Heights Inc., and Congregation Beth Hillel & Beth Israel.

Since 2002, Mount Sinai has seen a massive resurgence due to the influx of many young, religious Jews moving to the neighborhood.

The stained glass windows in the sanctuary were designed and made by Jean-Jacques Duval.

== Present ==
The current rabbi is Rabbi Yaakov Taubes, who previously served as OU/JLIC Rabbi at the University of Pennsylvania

Mount Sinai offers a wide range of programming for the Washington Heights Jewish community, including prayer services, lectures and programs for children, singles, families and seniors.
