= Peter Gibson =

Peter Gibson may refer to:

- Peter Gibson (judge) (born 1934), British judge
- Peter Gibson (glazier) (1929–2016), British glazier
- Peter Gibson (politician) (born 1975), British politician
