= Orange Street Historic District =

Historic district in Connecticut, United States

- U.S. National Register of Historic Places
- U.S. Historic district
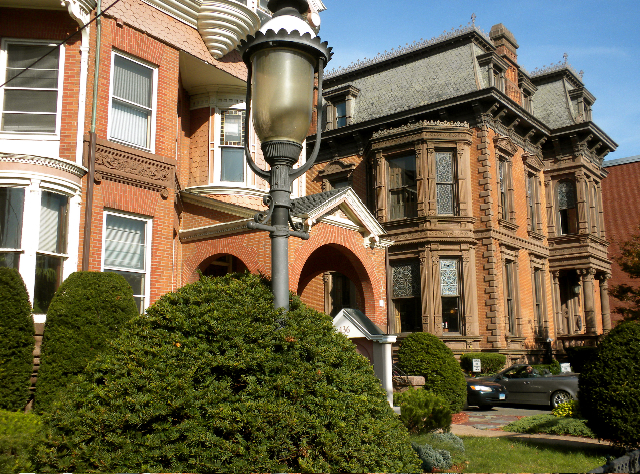
- 436 and 444 Orange Street

- Location within Connecticut Location within the United States
- Location: Roughly bounded by Whitney Avenue, State, Eagle & Trumbull Streets, New Haven, Connecticut
- Coordinates: 41°18′56″N 72°54′55″W
- Area: 125 acres (51 ha)
- Built: 1830
- Architect: Multiple
- Architectural style: Greek Revival, Italianate, Queen Anne
- NRHP reference No.: 85002314
- Added to NRHP: September 12, 1985

The Orange Street Historic District encompasses a large residential in the East Rock section of New Haven, Connecticut. Roughly bounded by Orange, Cottage, Eagle, State, and Audubon Streets, this area saw growth between about 1830 and 1900, and includes a broad diversity of well-preserved 19th-century residential structures. It was listed on the U.S. National Register of Historic Places in 1985. At that time, it included 546 buildings deemed to contribute to the historic character of the area.

New Haven's early economy was based mainly on trade based around its port. In the 1820s, the Farmington Canal opened, spurring a round of industrial development that was accompanied by population growth. The Orange Street area, located northeast of the New Haven Green, was one of the areas that saw significant development during this period. Around 1850, the city became a railroad transportation hub, and its industrial base expanded significantly. Residential growth in the Orange Street area expanded beyond Clark Street, into an area that was until 1850 farmland.

The district is an irregularly shaped area bounded on the northwest by Orange Street, between Audubon and Cottage Streets. The northwestern half of Orange Street is included in the Whitney Avenue Historic District, which abuts the Orange Street Historic District on the west. The southeastern boundary is State Street, although no buildings facing State Street are included. Most of the buildings in the district are residential, and are of wood-frame construction. They are stylistically diverse, with representative examples of styles from the late Federal period of the 1820s to the Colonial Revival of the early 20th century.

== Gallery ==
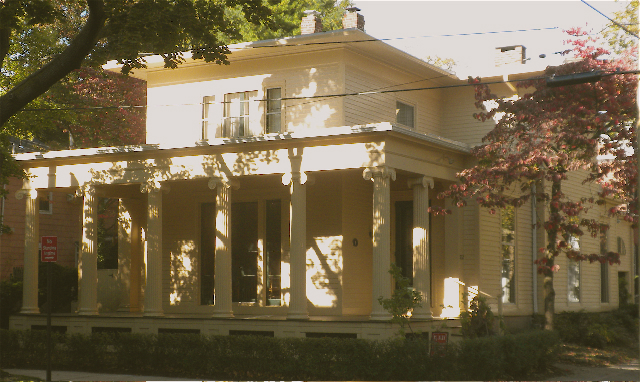
Everard Benjamin House, 232 Bradley Street (1838), with Ionic portico.

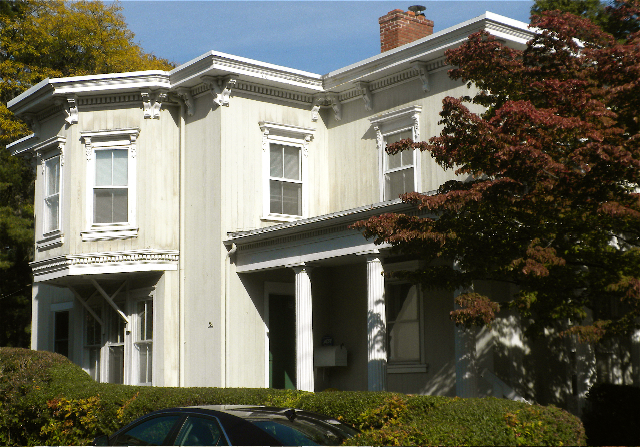
10 Lincoln Street (about 1840).

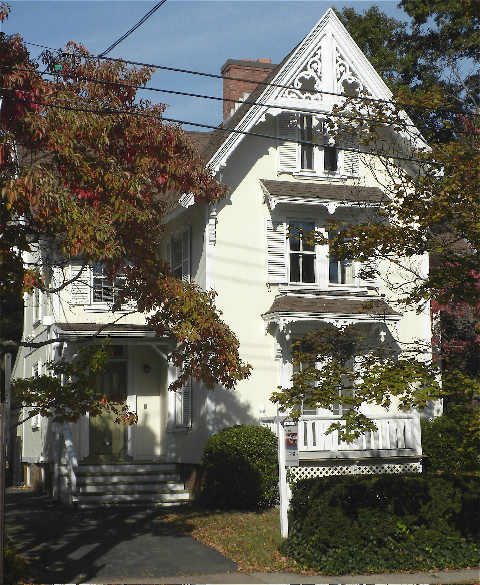
Gothic cottage, 12 Lincoln Street (about 1840).

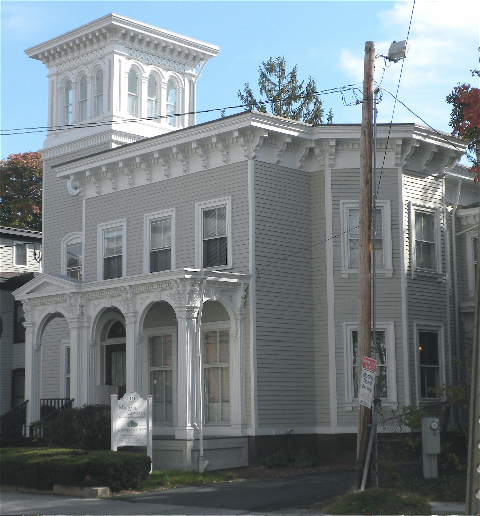
Timothy Lester House 431 Orange Street (1846), towered Italian villa.

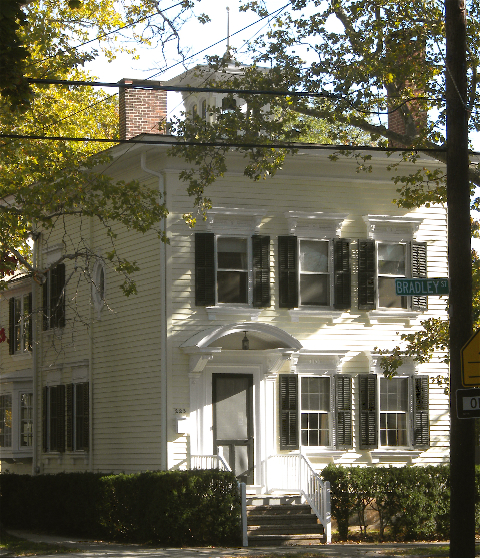
Home of George Dudley Seymour 223 Bradley Street (about 1848).

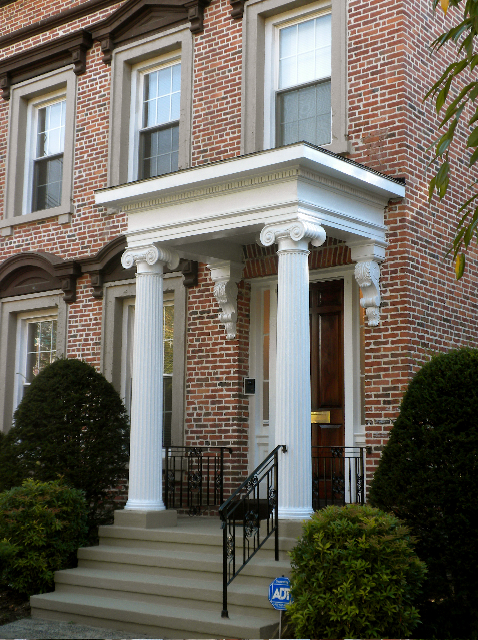
Greek Revival porch, 445 Orange Street (about 1855).

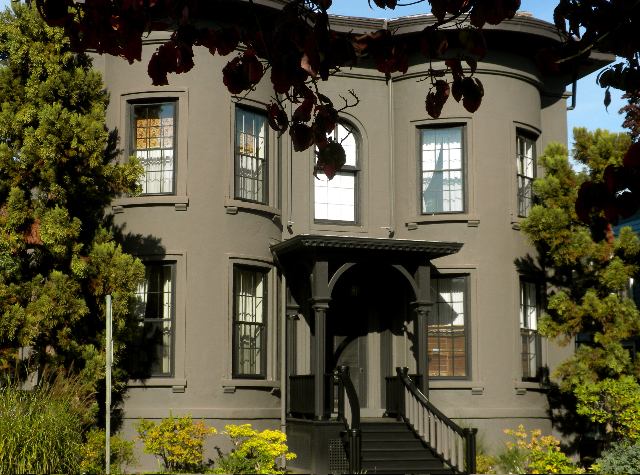
Nehemiah Sperry House, 466 Orange Street (1857).

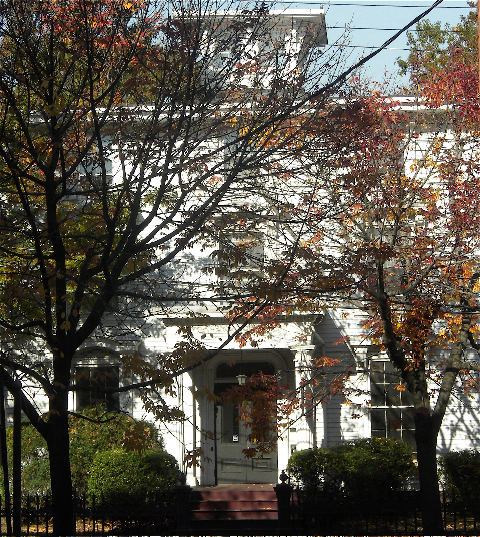
Italian villa, 400 Orange Street (about 1857).

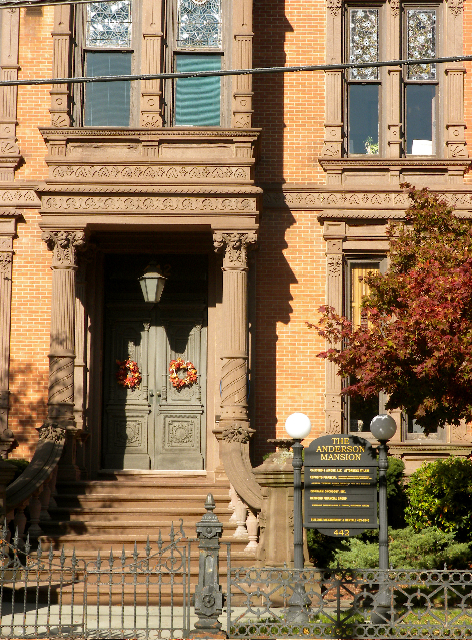
John C. Anderson House, 444 Orange Street (1882).

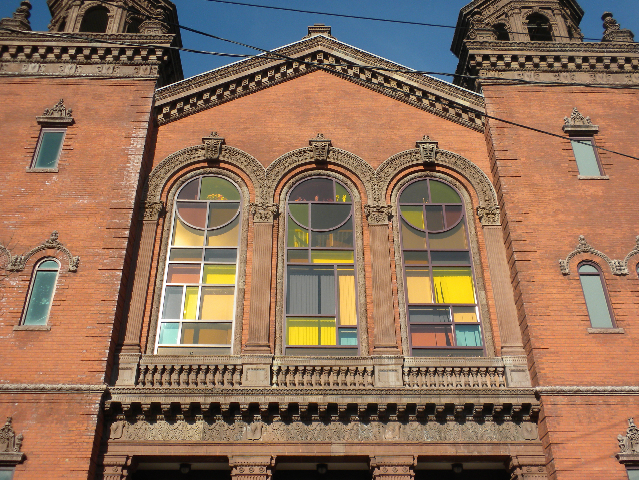
Temple Mishkan Israel, 55 Audubon Street (1897).

== See also ==
- National Register of Historic Places listings in New Haven, Connecticut
