= Julius Freund =

German Jewish art collector (1869–1941)

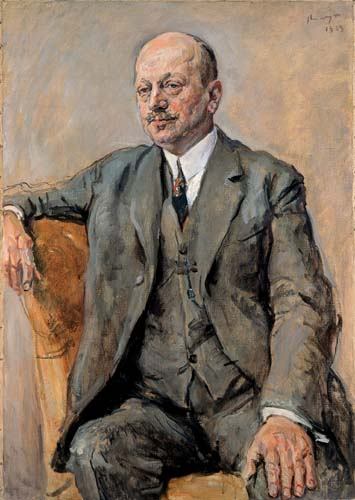
Portrait of Julius Freund by Max Slevogt, 1925

Julius Freund (18 April 1869 – 11 March 1941) was a German entrepreneur and art collector persecuted by the Nazis because he was Jewish.

== Life ==
The Cottbus-born textile manufacturer Julius Freund lived with his wife Clara, née Dresel, in Berlin. In 1908 their daughter Gisèle Freund was born, who became a well-known photographer.

=== Art collection ===
Julius Freund built up an important art collection, which mainly comprised German paintings, drawings, and prints from the 19th and 20th centuries. In 1929 Max Schlichting initiated the exhibition "Hundred Years of Berlin Art", which mainly consisted of works from Freund's collection.

=== Nazi persecution ===
When the Nazis rose to power in Germany in January 1933, the Freund family was persecuted because of their Jewish origins. The Freund's daughter Gisèle emigrated to Paris and Freund tried to move his art collection to safety. On 1 September 1933 Freund moved his art collection - consisting of 383 paintings, drawings and etchings - from Berlin to the Kunstmuseum Winterthur. A total of 415 works of art from the Julius Freund Collection were brought to the Kunstmuseum Winterthur.

On 18 February 1939, Julius and Clara Freund managed to emigrate to the United Kingdom. The Reichsführer SS Heinrich Himmler ordered the confiscation of their property that remained in Germany.

Julius Freund died in exile, in Wigton in northern England, in 1941.

=== Sale of Freund's collection ===
To survive, Clara Freund was forced to sell the art collection located in Switzerland. Art dealer Fritz Nathan organized the sale.

On 21 March 1942, the Julius Freund collection was auctioned off in the gallery of Theodor Fischer in Lucerne; Fischer played a key part in the trading of art looted by the Nazis. The foreword to the auction catalog was written by Freund's daughter Gisela, who had fled to Argentina. In it she stated: "My father, Julius Freund, collected decades and always only from the point of view of artistic value, never in the thought of monetary exploitation". At the same point it is pointed out that it was previously the intention of the collector to "bequeath his artistic possessions ... to a museum". This museum could have been the Märkisches Museum in Berlin. The catalog included large groups of works by Fritz Boehle, Carl Blechen, Daniel Chodowiecki, Lovis Corinth, Caspar David Friedrich, Theodor Hosemann, Käthe Kollwitz, Franz Krüger, Max Liebermann, Hans von Marées, Adolph von Menzel, Max Slevogt, Hans Thoma and Heinrich Zille, as well as other works by artists such as Theodor Alt, Albert Brendel, Ludwig Buchhorn, Carl Gustav Carus, Johan Christian Clausen Dahl, Anselm Feuerbach, Eduard Gaertner, Carl Graeb, Jakob Philipp Hackert, Karl Hagemeister, Johann Peter Hasenclever, Willy Jaeckel, Friedrich Kallmorgen, Max Klinger, Gerhard von Kügelgen, Wilhelm Leibl, Walter Leistikow, Friedrich Eduard Meyerheim, Paul Friedrich Meyerheim, Friedrich von Olivier, Ludwig Richter, Johann Gottfried Schadow, Karl Friedrich Schinkel, Franz Skarbina, Carl Steffeck, Wilhelm Trübner, Lesser Ury, and Anton von Werner. Pictures by the Belgian artists Jean-Baptiste Madou and Léon Mignon were the only works by non-German artists.

Hans Posse, Hitler's special representative for the Führermuseum planned in Linz, wrote to Hitler's confidante Martin Bormann on 11 February 1942 about the Freund collection that it contained "excellent German romantics (especially CD Friedrich) and many masters from the early 19th century. Century like Krüger It should be one of the last opportunities to expand the period of German painting in the first half of the 19th century." Despite the scarce foreign currency of Nazi Germany, Posse acquired from the Freund collection 113 paintings and drawings valued at 62,581.80 francs. While the paintings mostly passed into the possession of the Federal Republic of Germany after the war, 94 from the Weesenstein Castle depot were looted by the Soviet Union.

Swiss collectors and museums also purchased artworks from Freund Collection at the Fischer auction. The Kupferstichkabinett at the Kunstmuseum Basel acquired seven drawings by Blechen, Kollwitz, Liebermann, Marées and Menzel. The Kunsthaus Zürich bought eight drawings from the collection. The Zurich collector Emil Georg Bührle bought works by Blechen, Carus, Gustav Adolf Friedrich, Hosemann, Krüger, Menzel and Slevogt from the auction. Before the auction, the collector Oskar Reinhart acquired a portrait of Caspar David Friedrich by Gerhard von Kügelgen directly from Fritz Nathan.

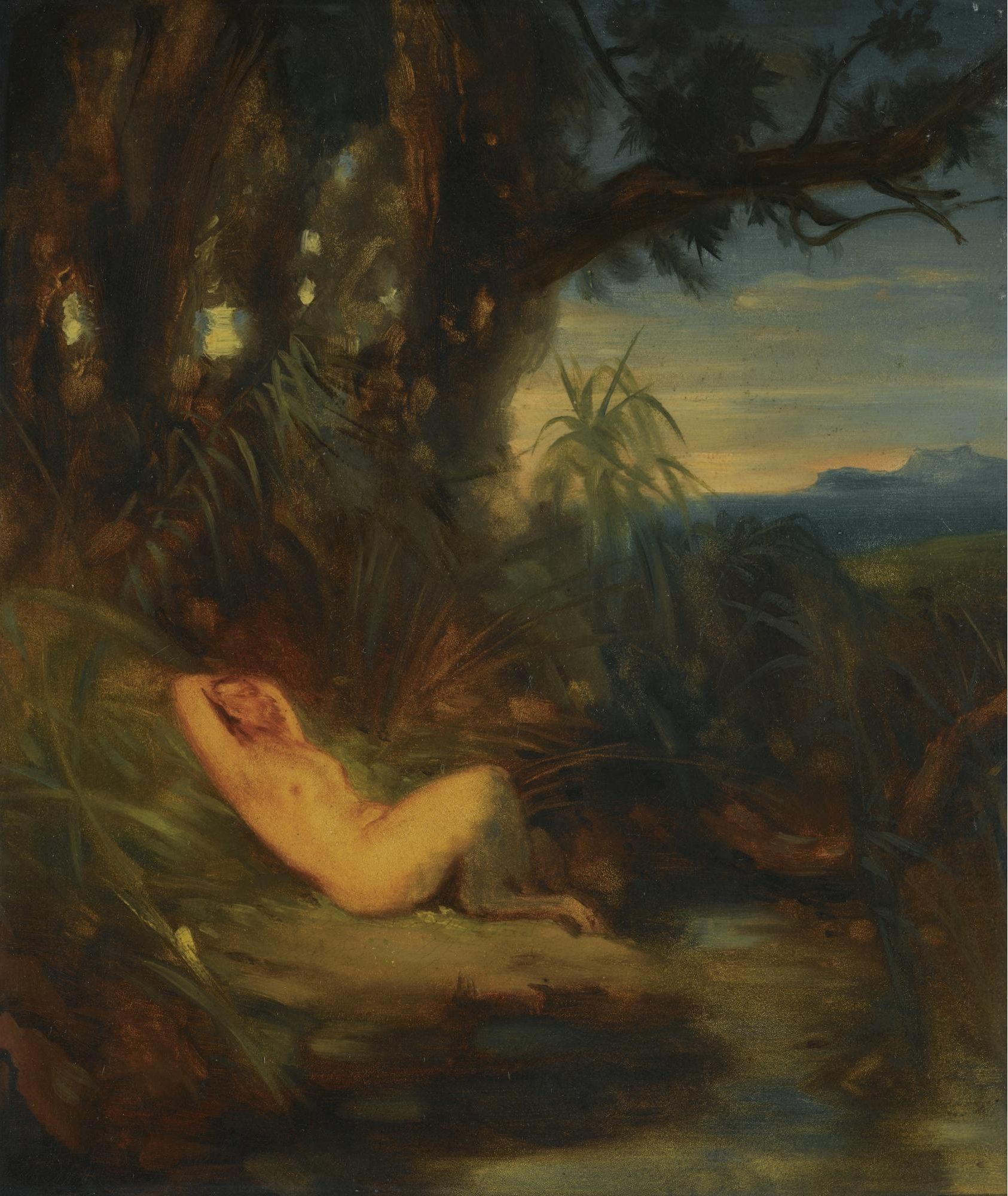
Carl Blechen - Schlafender Faun. Julius and Clara Freund, Berlin and Winterthur The Estate of Julius Freund (by descent from the above; forced sale: Galerie Theodor Fischer, Lucerne, Sammlung Julius Freund, 21 March 1942, lot 36) Deutsche Reich (acquired at the above sale) Bundesrepublik Deutschland (on loan 1968 to the Wallraf-Richartz-Museum (Inventar-Nr. Dep. 0324), Cologne) Restituted to the heirs of Julius Freund in 2009 and sold by Sotheby's on 29 November 2009 L09663 Lot Nr.4

=== Claims and restitution ===
It was only with the Washington Declaration of 1998 issued at the Washington Conference on Holocaust Era Assets that the heirs were able to obtain restitution of some works of art. In 2005 the Germany Advisory Commission ruled in favor of restitution, writing:

In 1939 Julius Freund and his wife, now penniless, emigrated to London because of the persecution measures of the Nazis. After his death in 1941, Clara Freund found herself in 1942 forced for economic reasons to have the collection auctioned in Lucerne at the Galerie Fischer. The pictures mentioned were acquired there by Hans Posse, Hitler's special commissioner for the development of the "Führer museum" in Linz. At the end of the war, the paintings were seized by the Allies, and as art works which at first could not be identified with their owner, were given as a loan by the German state to German museums. Later they were displayed as lost art in the internet database www.lostart.de, in order by this means to find those with justified claims.

In 2005, three paintings by Carl Blechen and a watercolor by Anselm Feuerbach, which had previously been on loan from the Federal Republic of Germany in various museums, were restituted to the Freund heirs. The watercolor The Funeral of the Court Jester by Anselm Feuerbach was previously in the Historical Museum of the Palatinate in Speyer, Blechen's painting Sleeping Faun in the Reeds in the Wallraf-Richartz Museum in Cologne, the painting Mühle im Tal (also mill in Saxon Switzerland) in the Electoral Palatinate Museum of the City of Heidelberg and Romantic Landscape with Ruin (also dawn - ruin) in the Westphalian State Museum in Münster. After restitution to the Freund heirs, Mill in a Valley was sold at Sothebys in 2009. The museum in Münster, which has since been renamed the LWL Museum for Art and Culture, was able to repurchase Blechen's painting from the heirs in 2010.

In 2020 the Saarland Cultural Heritage Foundation restituted several works by Max Slevogt to Freund's heirs who sold them back to the museum:

- Francisco d’Andrade (head study), 1902, oil on canvas
- Der Hafen von Brindisi (Port of Brindisi), 1914, watercolor
- Li-Hung-Tschang, 1900, ink drawing
- Scheherezade erzählt ihre Geschichte dem Kalifen (Scheherazade telling her stories to the caliph), 1901, pen and ink drawing
- Mungos (Mongoose), 1901, watercolor pen and ink drawing
- Klagende Frauen (Klageweiber vor einem Haus) (Grieving women [mourners in front of a house]), around 1898–1903, pen and ink drawing

== Literature ==
- Galerie Fischer (Hrsg.): Sammlung Julius Freund, aus dem Besitz von Frau Dr. G. Freund, Buenos Aires, Gemälde, Aquarelle, Zeichnungen und Druckgraphik. Luzern 1942.
- Esther Tisa Francini, Anja Heuss, Georg Kreis: Fluchtgut – Raubgut. Chronos Verlag, Zürich 2001, ISBN 3-0340-0601-2.
- Birgit Schwarz: Hitlers Museum, die Fotoalben "Gemäldegalerie Linz", Dokumente zum "Führermuseum". Böhlau, Wien 2004, ISBN 3-205-77054-4.

== See also ==
- List of claims for restitution for Nazi-looted art
- Reich Flight Tax
