= Bruce M. Cohen =

American rabbi (1945–2010)

Bruce Mark Cohen
- Born: May 8, 1945; Buffalo, New York, U.S.
- Died: August 2, 2010 (aged 65); White Plains, New York, U.S.
- Education: Cornell University; Hebrew Union College-Jewish Institute of Religion
- Occupation: Rabbi
- Known for: Co-founder of Interns for Peace
- Spouse: Karen Wald Cohen
- Children: 4

Bruce Mark Cohen (May 8, 1945 – August 2, 2010) was an American Rabbi who co-founded the Interns for Peace, an organization founded in Israel in 1976 that is dedicated to fostering understanding between Arabs and Israelis through the training of community development and peace workers.

Cohen was born on May 8, 1945, in Buffalo, New York, where his father was a justice of the New York Supreme Court justice and his mother was a teacher. He earned his undergraduate degree at Cornell University with a major in labor relations. After a professor at Cornell convince him to pursue his spiritual side, Cohen attended Hebrew Union College-Jewish Institute of Religion, where he earned a bachelor's in Hebrew letters in 1970, a master's in 1973, the same year that he received his rabbinic ordination. He later earned a doctorate from the college in 1988.

After five Arab citizens of Israel were killed in Nazareth by Israeli security forces during the Land Day protest on March 30, 1976, his congregants from Congregation Mishkan Israel in Hamden, Connecticut, funded a mission to Israel for Cohen to promote peace. While on his trip to Israel, he met Farhat Agbaria, an Israeli Arab who shared Cohen's vision of peace-building, and the two co-founded Interns for Peace. Interns for Peace aims to foster peace through building personal connections between Arabs and Jews, with Cohen noting that "every time you create contact it's successful because it breaks stereotypes". Cohen sought to overcome longstanding attitudes in which Israeli Arabs are viewed as a fifth column, while Jews are labeled as oppressors. By the time of Cohen's death, the organization had trained 300 volunteers who have worked together on projects ranging from arts festivals to tree planting projects. Cohen's widow, Karen Wald Cohen, continues to serve as international director of Interns for Peace.

Cohen married Karen Wald Cohen in 1989 and adopted four children. He died at age 65 on August 2, 2010, at his home in White Plains, New York due to cancer.
