= Max Slevogt =

German artist

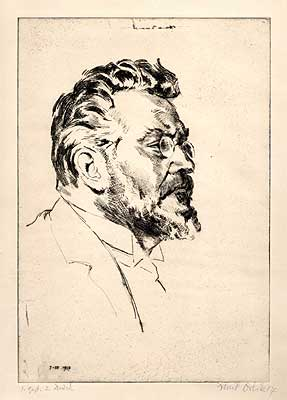
- Slevogt portrayed in a 1917 etching by Emil Orlik
- Born: 8 October 1868; Landshut, Kingdom of Bavaria
- Died: 20 September 1932 (aged 63); Leinsweiler, Bavaria, Germany
- Education: Munich Academy; Académie Julian
- Known for: Painter, scene designer
- Movement: Orientalist

Max Slevogt (8 October 1868 – 20 September 1932) was a German Impressionist painter and illustrator, best known for his landscapes. He was, together with Lovis Corinth and Max Liebermann, one of the foremost representatives in Germany of the plein air style.

== Biography ==
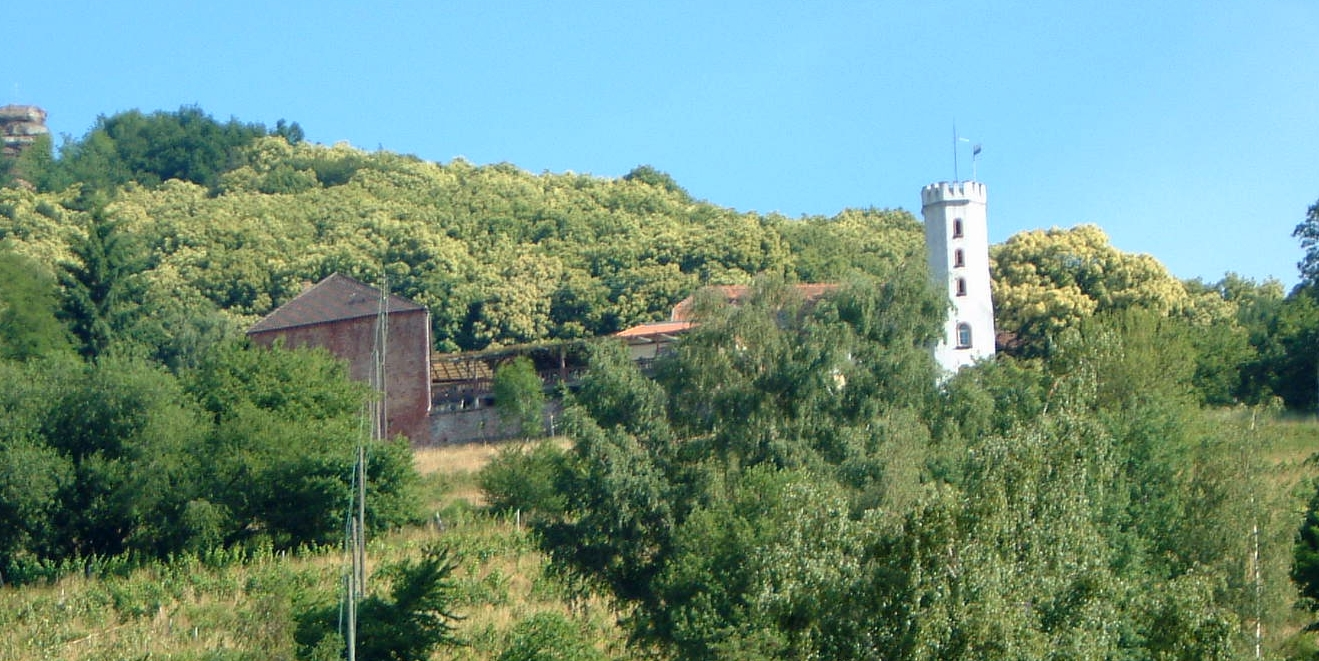
Slevogthof Neukastel

He was born in Landshut, Kingdom of Bavaria, in 1868. From 1885 to 1889 he studied at the Munich Academy, and his early paintings are dark in tone, exemplifying the prevailing style in Munich. In 1889 Slevogt visited Paris, where he attended the Académie Julian. In 1896, he drew caricatures for the magazines Simplicissimus and Jugend, and the next year he had his first solo exhibition in Vienna.

Toward the end of the 1890s his palette brightened. He travelled again to Paris in 1900, where he was represented in the German pavilion of the world exhibition with the work Scheherezade, and was greatly impressed by the paintings of Édouard Manet. In 1901 he joined the Berlin Secession.

A trip to Egypt in 1914 resulted in 21 oil paintings in a fresh bright style, as well as numerous watercolors and drawings; on the return journey he stopped off in Italy. In June he acquired the country seat Neukastel. After the outbreak of World War I he was sent as official war painter to the western front. The war experience brought about a search for new style appropriate to the expression of the horrors of war. Gabriel Ferry's book Der Waldlaufer, published in 1921 in a limited edition, was illustrated with lithographs by Slevogt, many of these show the terror of pursuit and horrors of war.

In the same year he became a member of the Prussian Academy of Arts in Berlin.

He designed scenery for the performance of Mozart's Don Giovanni in the Dresdner state opera in 1924. His work was part of the painting event in the art competition at the 1928 Summer Olympics. In 1929 he was given a large 60th birthday exhibition in the Prussian academy of the arts in Berlin. During the last year of his life he worked on the religious mural Golgatha in the peace church in Ludwigshafen on the Rhine. It was destroyed by bombing raids during World War II.

Max Slevogt died in Leinsweiler (at that time in the Rheinpfalz part of Bavaria) in 1932. He is buried in the burial place of the family Finkler east of his house, the so-called Slevogthof (with wall paintings) at Neukastel.

== Restitutions of artworks ==
In 2020 the Saarland Cultural Heritage Foundation announced the return of the following Max Slevogt works to the heirs of Julius Freund, whose family was racially persecuted as Jews after 30 January 1933 and forced to sell under the Nazis.

- Francisco d'Andrade (Head Study), 1902, oil on canvas.
- The Port of Brindisi, 1914, watercolor
- Li-Hung-Tschang, 1900, ink drawing
- Scheherezade tells her story to the Caliph, 1901, pen drawing
- Mungos, 1901, watercolor pen drawing
- Lamenting Women (Lamenting Women in front of a House), ca.1898–1903, pen and ink drawing

== Selected paintings ==
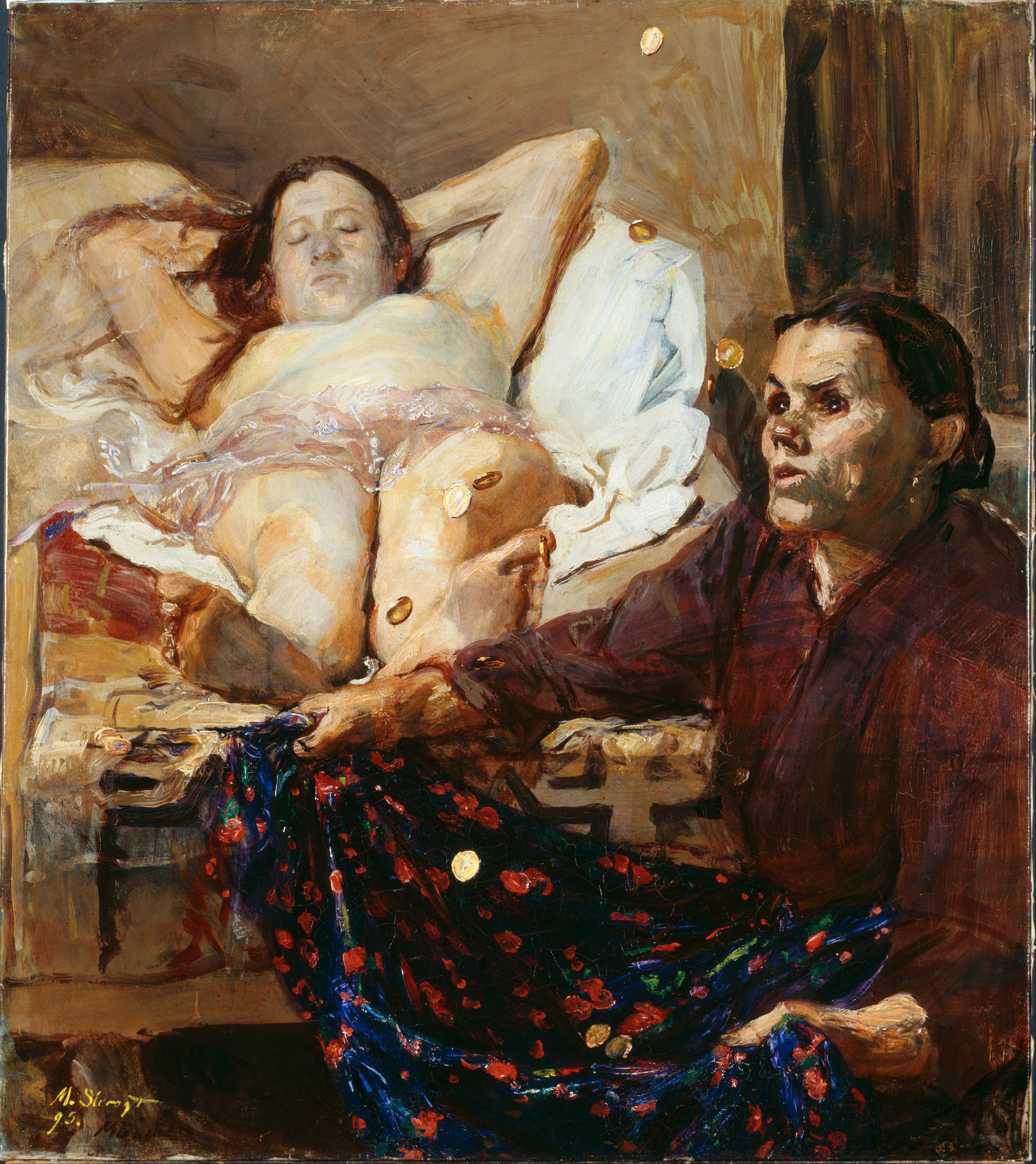
Danaë (1895)

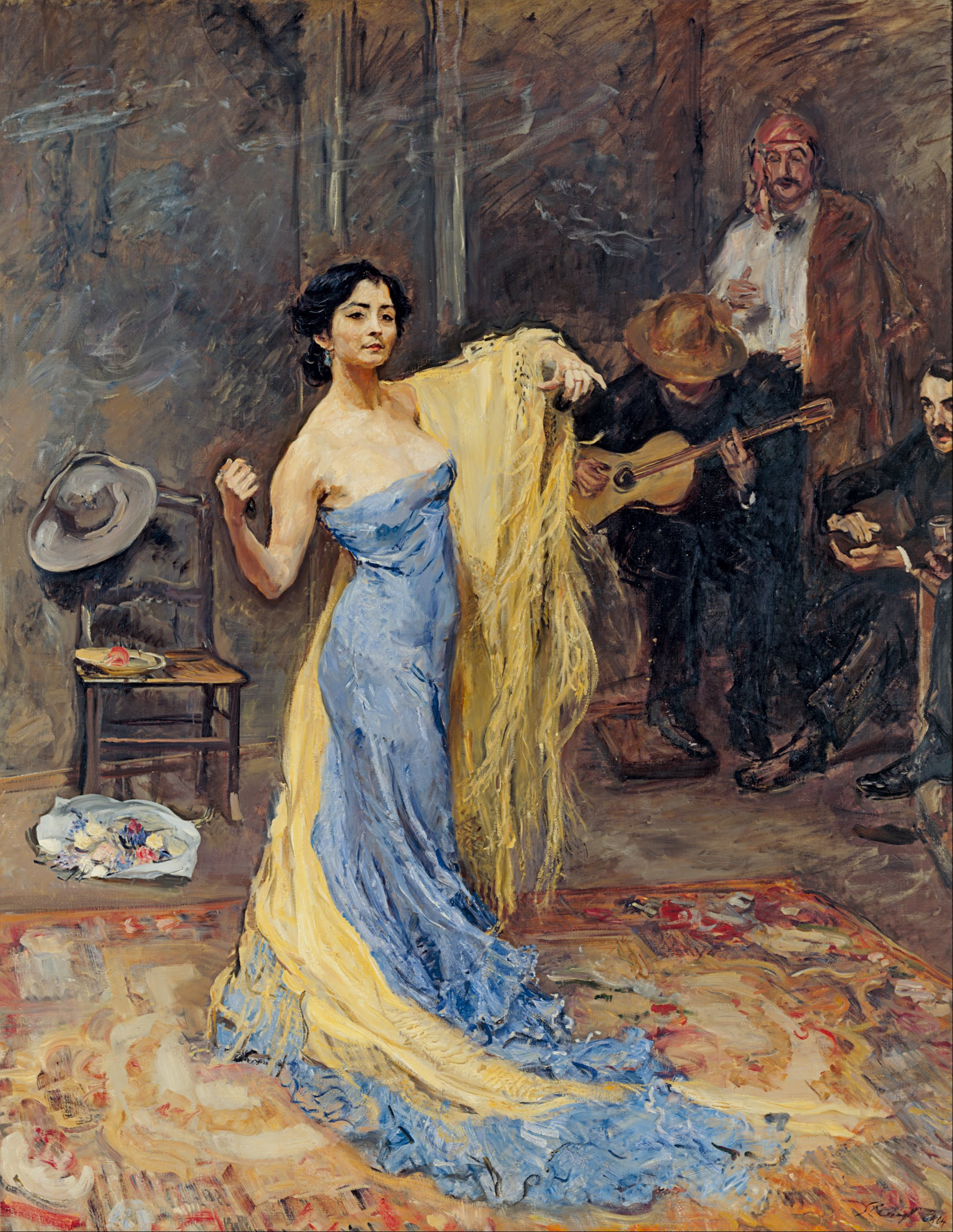
Portrait of the Dancer Marietta di Rigardo (1904)

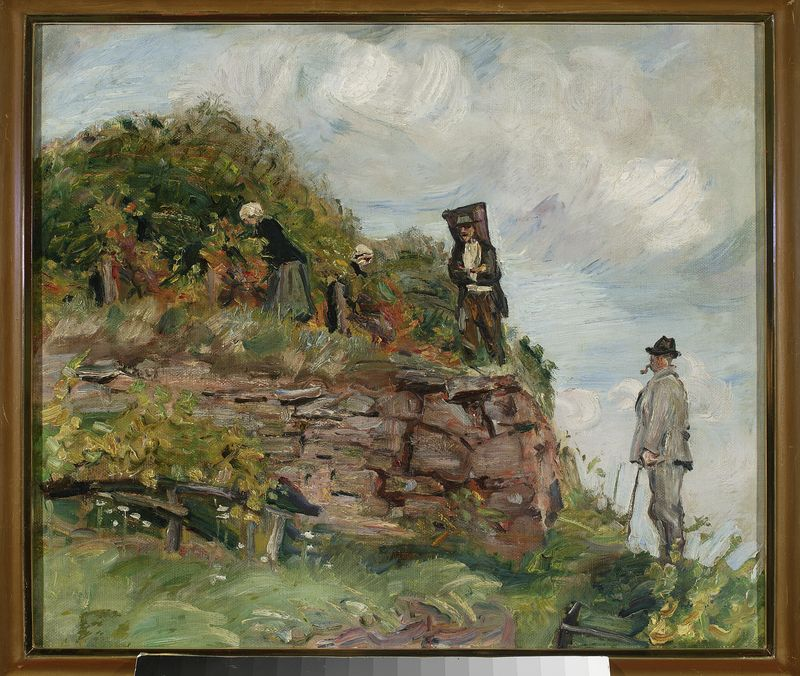
Grape Harvest (ca. 1900–1909)

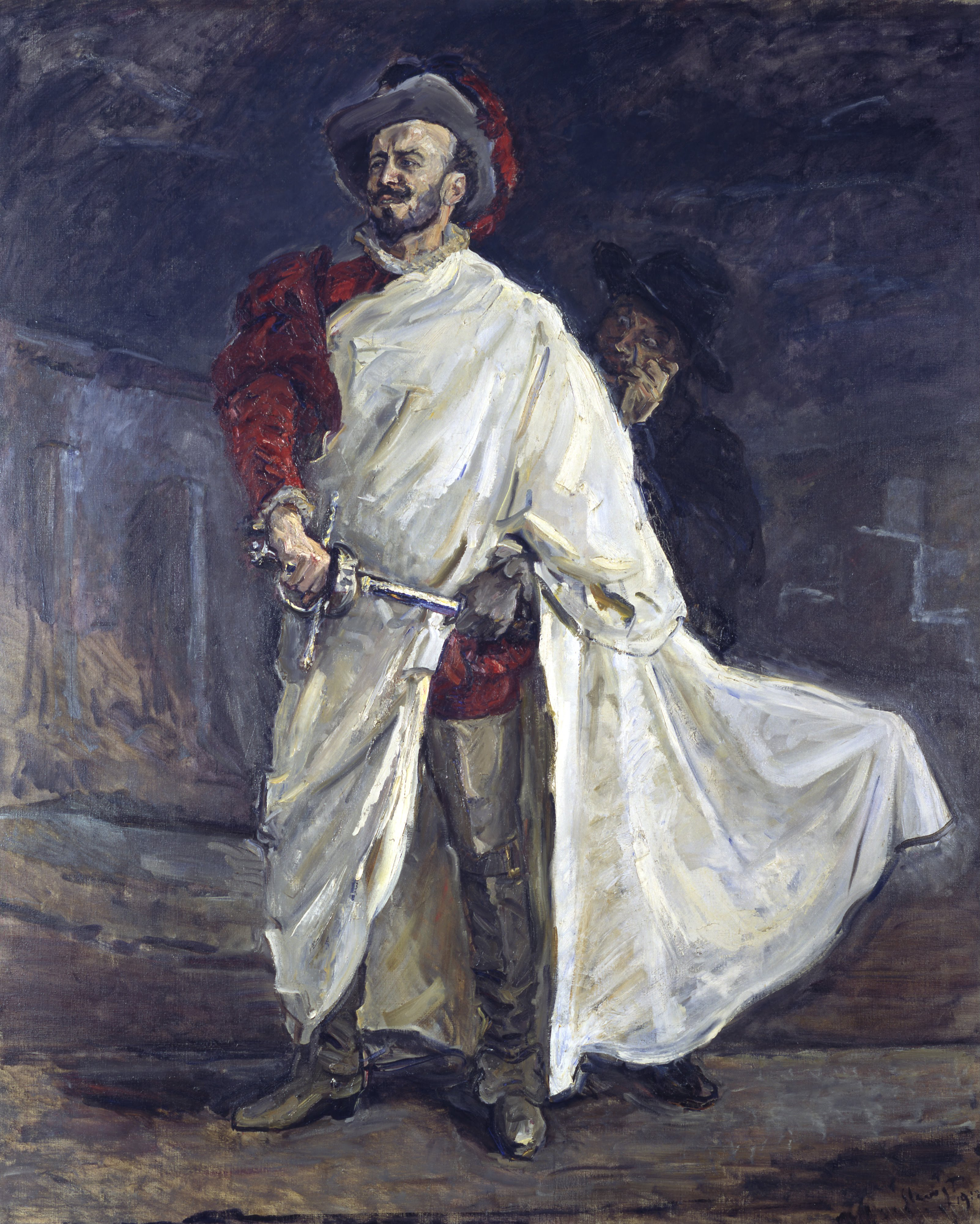
Francisco d'Andrade as Don Giovanni (1912)

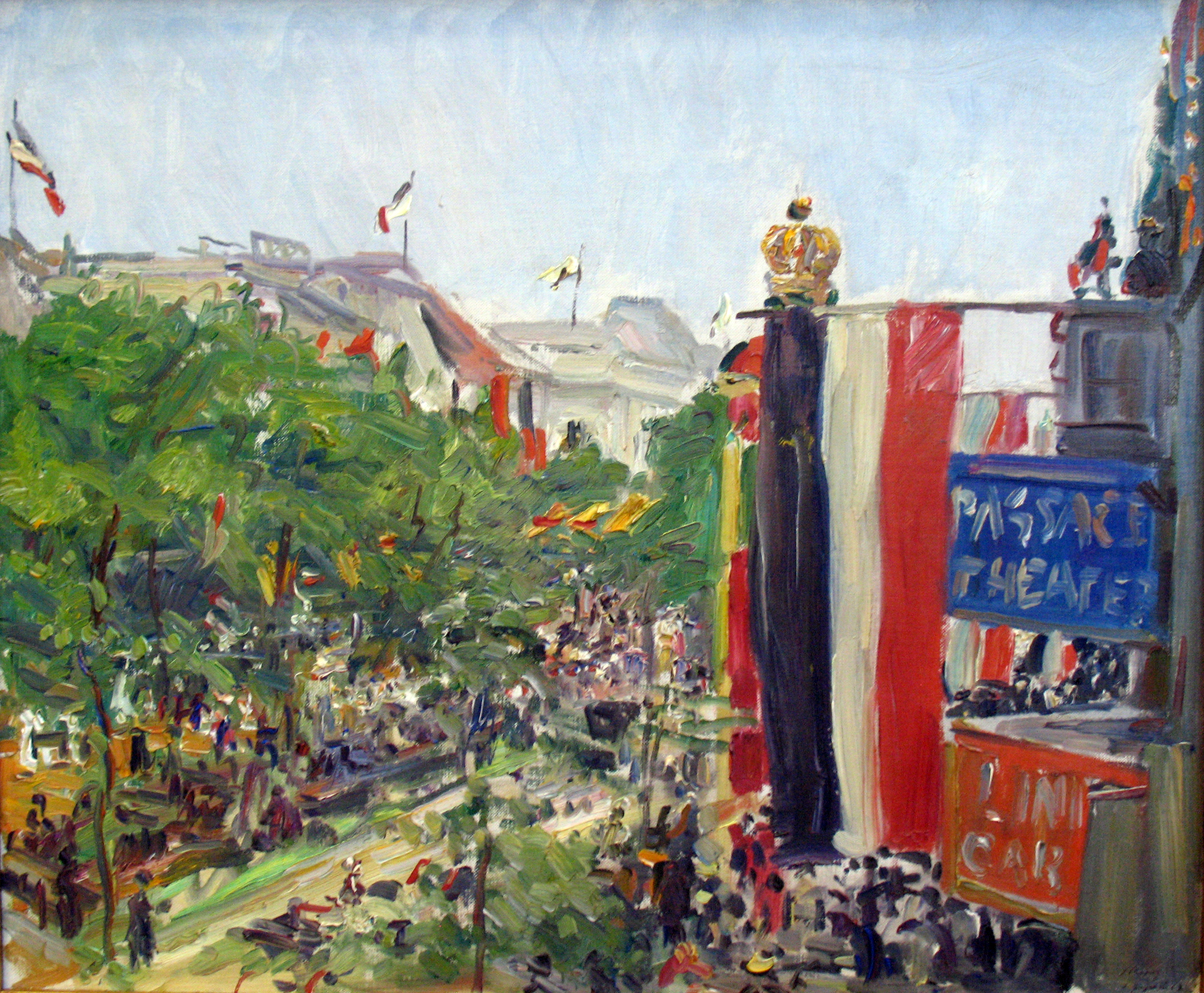
Under the Linden Trees (1913)

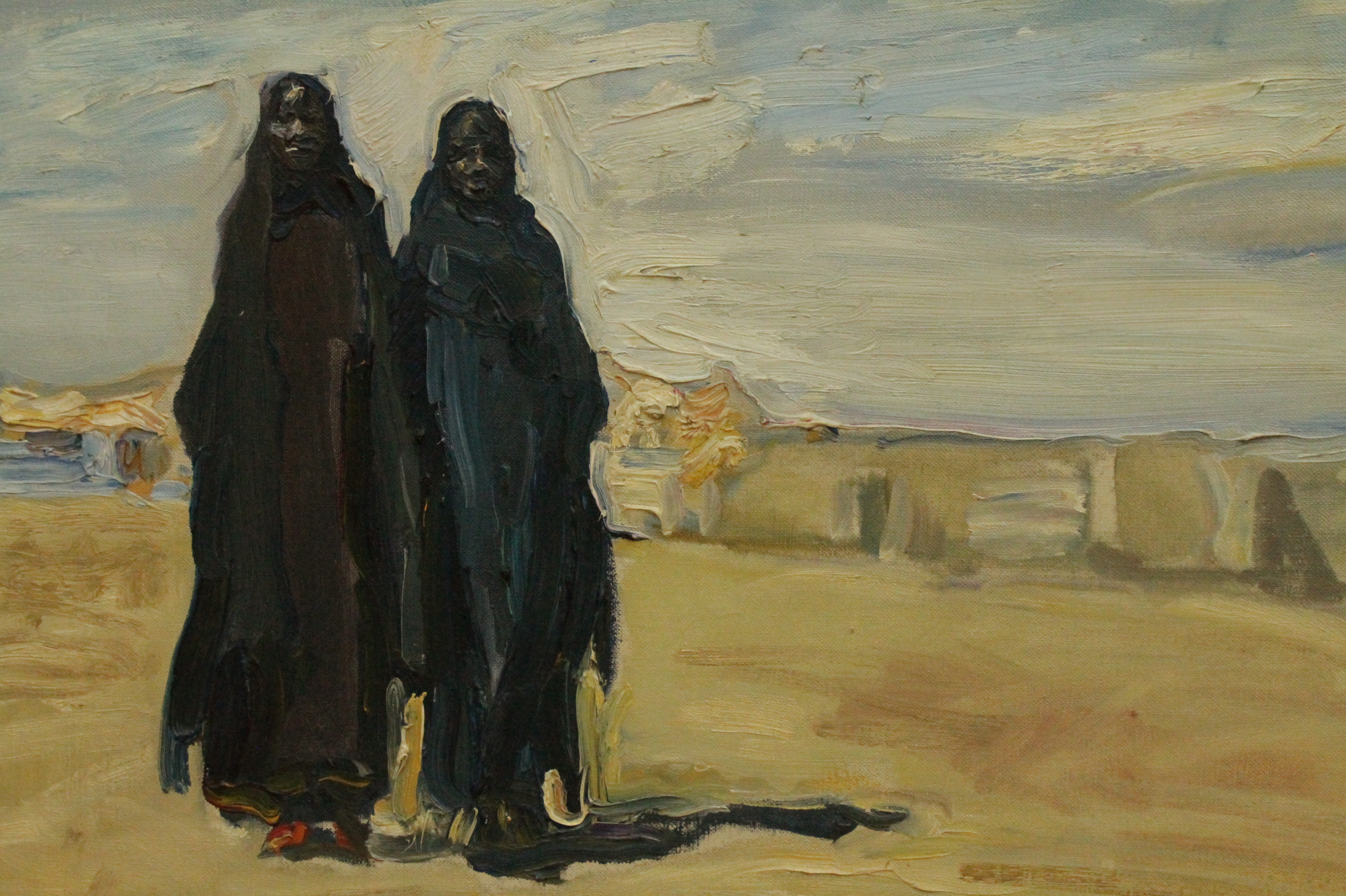
Sudanese Women in Egypt (1914), Albertinum
