= Interns for Peace =

Interns for Peace is an organization founded by Israeli Arab Farhat Agbaria and American rabbi Bruce M. Cohen in 1976 with the mission of fostering the creation of personal relationships between Israel's Arabs and Jews, with the goal of creating greater understanding and promoting peace.

After five Arab citizens of Israel were killed in Nazareth by Israeli security forces during the Land Day protest on March 30, 1976, Cohen's congregants from Congregation Mishkan Israel, Hamden, Connecticut provided funding for a mission to Israel for Cohen to promote peace. While on his trip to Israel, he met Agbaria, an Israeli Arab who shared Cohen's vision of peace-building, and the two co-founded Interns for Peace. Initially the group trained American college students, but shifted over the years to training Arabs and Jews from Israel. Interns for Peace aims to foster peace through building personal connections between Arabs and Jews, with Cohen noting that "every time you create contact it's successful because it breaks stereotypes". Cohen sought to overcome longstanding attitudes in which Israeli Arabs are viewed as a fifth column, while Jews are labeled as oppressors. By May 1980, the organization had trained 10 interns who spent six months at a kibbutz learning Arabic and Hebrew and were placed in the Israeli Arab communities of Kafr Qara and Tamra. The local Arab-led governments covered the cost of housing the interns while salaries were paid by Interns for Peace. Cohen emphasized that the organization is not a Peace Corps, in which Jews would be the ones helping poor Arabs. Rather, Jews and Arabs would work together and learn skills from each other by working together. By 1999, Interns for Peace worked to create a chapter of the organization in the West Bank.

By 2010, the organization had trained 300 volunteers who have worked together on projects ranging from arts festivals to tree planting projects. By 1994, the organization had brought together 80,000 Israeli Arabs and Jews in community projects, helping build understanding through common action. Palestinians trained through the program and placed in the West Bank and Gaza could help Arabs identify and address their own community needs. An Interns for Peace program in 2004 had participants work together on road safety projects, addressing the lack of infrastructure in Arab and Jewish communities outside the big cities.

Cohen's widow, Karen Wald Cohen, is now international director of the organization, and Agbaria is chief of the Israeli division.
