= Eduard Sturzenegger =

Eduard Sturzenegger (November 28, 1854, in Teufen AR – February 20, 1932, in St. Gallen) was a Swiss manufacturer and art collector.

== Life ==
Eduard Sturzenegger was a son of the tailor Bartholome Sturzenegger and Elsbeth Sturzenegger, nee Meier. He completed an apprenticeship as an embroidery draftsman. From 1872 he worked as a designer in his own studio in St. Gallen. After further training in Paris and Saint-Quentin in Picardy, he founded an embroidery factory in St. Gallen in 1883, adding a shop in 1886, and expanding to Lucerne, Basel, Geneva, St. Moritz and San Remo. The company was transformed into Ed. Sturzenegger AG, which existed until 2007. Sturzenegger died in 1932 in St. Gallen.

== Art collection ==
In 1926 Sturzenegger donated 175 paintings from his art collection to the city of St. Gallen. Some of these are now in the St. Gallen Art Museum. The collection's focus was the Munich School and paintings from the 19th century.

After his death, the collection continued to evolve, with paintings being sold and others being added.

=== Merger ===
In 1937 the Sturzenegger collection was shown in the St. Gallen Villa am Berg and Villa Schiess on Rosenbergstrasse. In 1940 there was a joint exhibition which included works from both the Art Museum and the Sturzenegger painting collection, which was still owned by the municipality. In 1979 the two collections were nominally merged after the creation of the “St. Gallen Museum Foundation”. In 2018 there were still 143 paintings from the former Sturzenegger collection in the St. Gallen Art Museum.

=== The Nazi-era provenance research project ===
In 2017, the ownership history of artworks in the St. Gallen Art Museum began to be investigated as part of a Nazi-era provenance project. The reason for this was the Gurlitt case and the discovery of at least two Nazi-looted artworks (out of 15,000).

Initially, provenance research was limited to the Sturzenegger collection, even though the Sturzenegger donation occurred before 1933 and the advent of the “Third Reich”. An article in the Handelszeitung in May 2017 explained that the research was needed because of the redesign of the collection in St. Gallen in the 1930s.

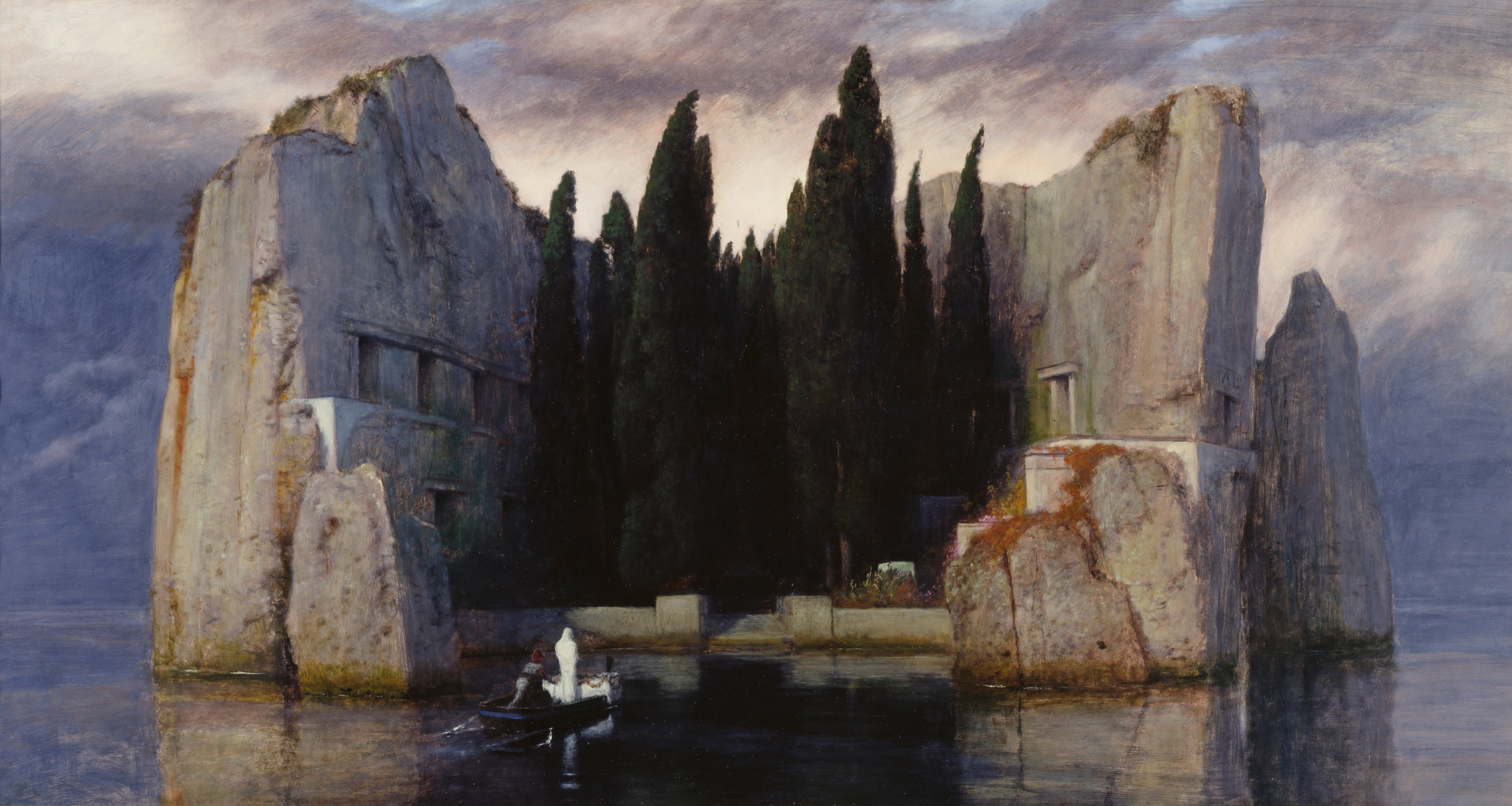
The island of the dead

The art dealer Fritz Nathan played a key role in the redesign of the Sturzenegger collection in St. Gallen during the Nazi era, along with the mayor Konrad Naegeli and the art historian Walter Hugelshofer. Nathan, who worked closely with Oskar Reinhart, Emil Georg Bührle and Theodor Fischer, was still able to enter the German Reich and buy and sell works of art thanks to his good relationships even after his gallery was confiscated by the NSDAP because he was Jewish. From the Sturzenegger collection in St. Gallen, he sold several dozen paintings in Germany that were thought to be “artistically unpleasant” and in return acquired “more valuable” ones. As early as 1935 Hugelshofer had stated with regard to the pictures that were to be sold: "The majority [...] can only be used in Munich. Fortunately, there is currently a momentary boom for paintings of this kind. [...] Since this wave of bad taste is likely to subside again in the foreseeable future, it is very advisable to take advantage of this unexpected opportunity - happiness in disaster."

By 1936, Nathan sold a total of 61 pictures from the collection, including Arnold Böcklin's Island of the Dead, which Sturzenegger had once hung in his office and which now came into the possession of Adolf Hitler and was housed in the Reich Chancellery.

When Nathan could no longer travel to Germany, he kept in touch with Karl Haberstock, Hitler's preferred art dealer, and was able to sell pictures that ended up in the so-called Führer Museum. Nathan purchased 26 paintings for the Sturzenegger collection in Switzerland. Nathan was placed on the Art Looting Investigation Unit Red Flag list of names by Allied investigators in 1946 for his Nazi-era dealings.

In August 2018, as a result of the provenance research on the Sturzenegger Collection in St. Gallen, it was reported that, in addition to the paintings personally donated by Eduard Sturzenegger in 1926, a further 120 pictures from the Sturzenegger collection had been added from 1933 onwards of which 77 still had gaps in the years 1933-1945
