= Josh Zeid =

American baseball player and coach (born 1987)

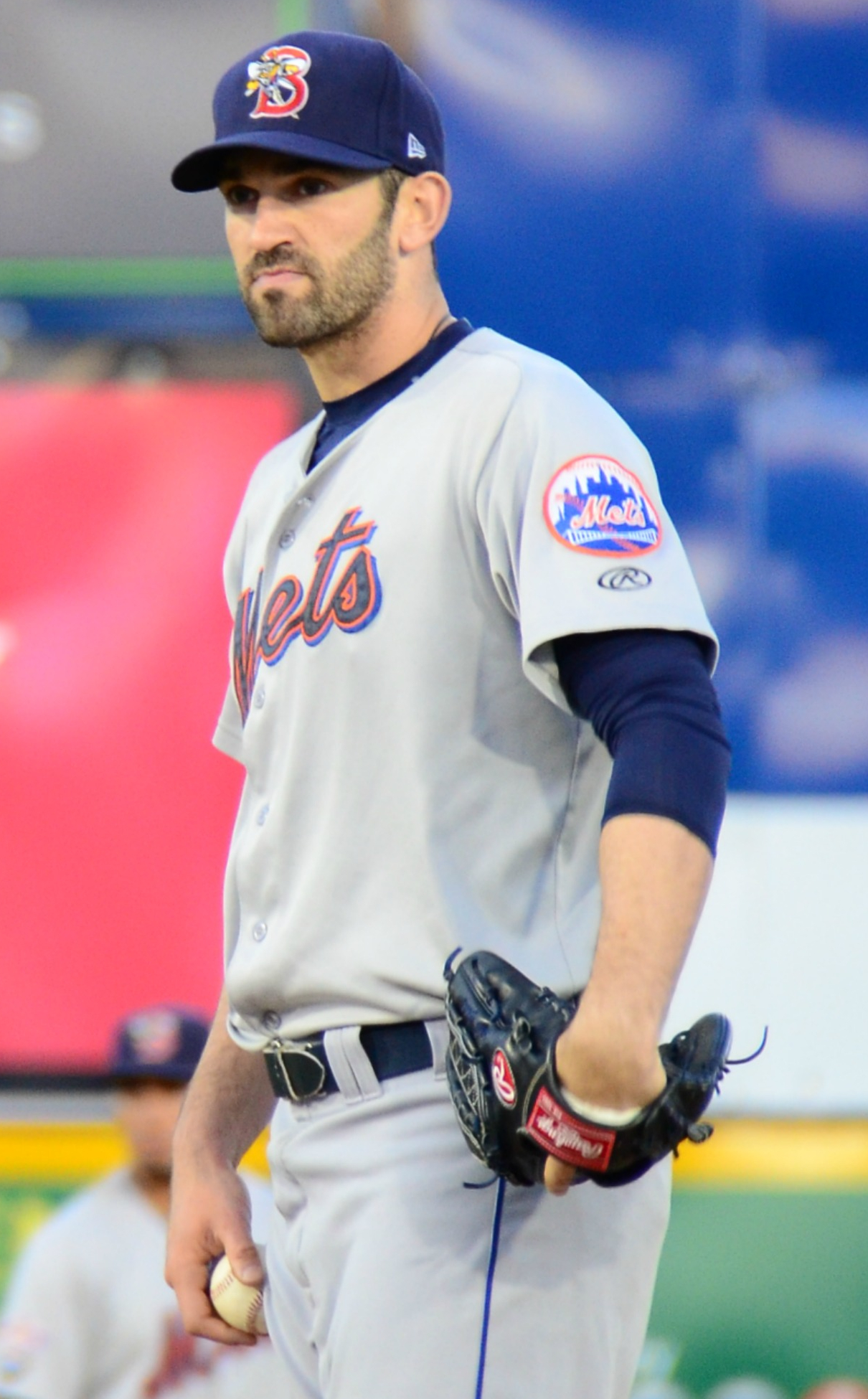
- Zeid in 2016
- Pitcher
- Born: March 24, 1987 (age 39); New Haven, Connecticut, U.S.
- Batted: Right Threw: Right

MLB debut
- July 30, 2013, for the Houston Astros

Last MLB appearance
- July 24, 2014, for the Houston Astros

MLB statistics
- Win–loss record: 0–1
- Earned run average: 5.21
- Strikeouts: 42
- Stats at Baseball Reference

Teams
- Houston Astros (2013–2014)
Medals
Men's baseball
Representing United States
World Youth Baseball Championship
Gold medal – first place	2003 Kaohsiung	Team
Representing Israel
European Baseball Championship
Silver medal – second place	2021 Turin	Team

Joshua Alexander Zeid OLY (/zaɪd/ ZYDE; Hebrew: ג'וש זייד; born March 24, 1987) is an American-Israeli former professional baseball pitcher and current coach. He plays for Team Israel. He played in Major League Baseball (MLB) for the Houston Astros.

Zeid played for the gold-medal-winning Team USA Youth National Team in 2003. In his senior year in high school he was named Gatorade Connecticut High School Player of the Year, and Baseball America ranked him the nation's 27th-best prospect. He was drafted in the 10th round of the 2009 Major League Baseball draft, and in 2010 he was named a South Atlantic League midseason All-Star, and won the MiLB Best Reliever (Single-A) Award. He debuted in the major leagues with the Houston Astros in 2013.

He pitched for Team Israel at the 2017 World Baseball Classic, and was named to the 2017 All-World Baseball Classic team. His fastball reached 97 mph.

After retiring from major league baseball, Zeid joined the Chicago Cubs front office as a pitching analyst. In November 2019, he obtained Israeli citizenship so that he could play for Team Israel in baseball at the 2020 Summer Olympics. He pitched for Team Israel at the 2020 Summer Olympics in Tokyo in the summer of 2021.

== Personal ==
Zeid was born to Ira (a dentist) and Karen Zeid (who works at a senior center) in New Haven, Connecticut, grew up in Woodbridge, Connecticut, and is Jewish. As a child he had a bar mitzvah, went to Hebrew school three days a week, and attended Congregation B'nai Jacob. He always wears a Star of David around his neck and a chai, and as to being Jewish, he said: “If you become a successful athlete, you should let people know where you’re from.”

In January 2013 he married the former Stephanie Tiedemann, a doctor of neuropsychology at The University of Texas Health Science Center in Houston, and a former Vanderbilt (2007) and Florida Institute of Technology (Masters/Doctor of Psychology) student. They have two sons, Parker and Barrett.

== High school and college ==
Zeid was a pitcher for the Hornets at Hamden Hall Country Day School (2005), where he had 400 strikeouts, a school record. In addition to pitching, he played first base, shortstop, and center field. He played for the gold medal-winning Team USA Youth National Team in 2003, and was an AFLAC All American in 2004.

In his junior and senior years he led his high school team to two straight New England Championships, and a record of 54–15. In his junior year in 2004, he struck out 68 batters in 42 innings and had a 1.66 ERA, while batting .412. In his senior year, he struck out 130 batters in 65.0 innings and batted .450, and was team captain. That year, he was the Gatorade Connecticut High School Player of the Year, Baseball America ranked him the country's 27th-best prospect, and he was a Louisville Slugger, National High School Baseball Coaches Association, Collegiate Baseball, and Street & Smith All American. He played for the Long Island Titans in the summer of his senior year. They finished 43–5. He earned two varsity letters in basketball.

He played college baseball, pitching for the Vanderbilt Commodores baseball team for two years, and then for Tulane University, where he pitched for the Green Wave baseball team and was an English major. He also pitched for the Torrington Twisters of the New England Collegiate Baseball League in 2006, and for the Harwich Mariners of the Cape Cod Collegiate Baseball League in 2007. In the 2016-17 off-season, he took a class at Tulane, as he had just a few credits left in order to obtain his degree. He graduated in January 2019.

== Playing career ==
=== Philadelphia Phillies ===
He was drafted out of Tulane by the Philadelphia Phillies in the 10th round of the 2009 Major League Baseball draft as a starter. Zeid received a $10,000 signing bonus. He pitched as a starter for the Single–A Williamsport Crosscutters, and had an 8–5 record with a 2.94 ERA, holding batters to a .217 average.

In 2010, he pitched for the Lakewood BlueClaws and split his season between starting and relieving, finishing the season 8–4 with 8 saves, a 2.93 ERA, 111 strikeouts in 107.3 innings, and 27 walks. He was named a South Atlantic League midseason All-Star, won the MiLB Best Reliever (Single–A) award, and Baseball America named him the # 23 prospect in the Phillies organization and said he had the best slider of any pitcher in their minor league system. In the off-season he played for the Mesa Solar Sox of the Arizona Fall League where he was named an AFL Rising Star, blogging about his experience for MLB.com.

He played for Double-A Reading in 2011, starting the season in its starting rotation before moving to the bullpen.

=== Houston Astros ===
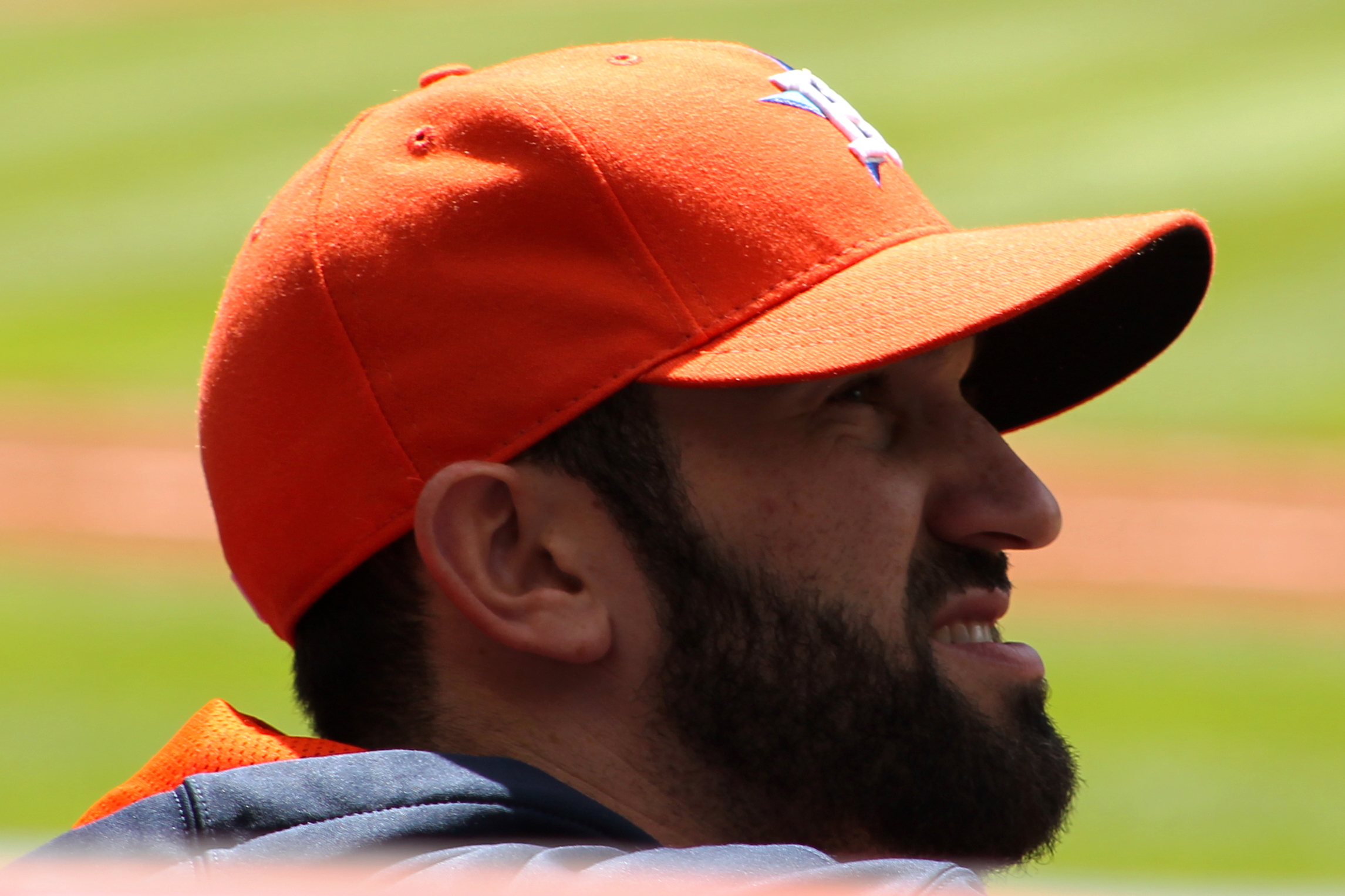
Josh Zeid in 2014

Zeid was traded on July 29, 2011, along with Jonathan Singleton, Jarred Cosart, and Domingo Santana to the Houston Astros for All Star right fielder Hunter Pence.

After the season, Zeid pitched for the Salt River Rafters in the Arizona Fall League, where he was named an AFL Rising Star.

Going into 2012, he was ranked No. 19 in the Astros system by baseball writer Jonathan Mayo, for his "plus fastball" and "nasty slider." In 2012, Zeid pitched as a reliever for an entire season for the first time, pitching in 47 games for the Double-A Corpus Christi Hooks, and striking out 66 batters in 56.1 innings.

In March 2013, Zeid was looking to add a third pitch to his fastball and slider. In 2013, he threw a 95–97 mph fastball, and a hard slider. Only the top 15 percent of major league pitchers throw a 95 mph fastball.

He pitched as the closer for the Triple–A Oklahoma City RedHawks in 2013, with a 4–1 record, 13 saves in 15 save opportunities (tied for the club lead), and 3.50 ERA over 43 games, as Zeid struck out 53 batters in 43.2 innings.

Zeid was called up to the majors for the first time on July 29, 2013. In 25 relief appearances he stranded 15 of 17 inherited runners, and held lefties to a .178 batting average. He ended 2013 with a 0–1 record and a 3.90 ERA in 27 2/3 innings pitched.

He made 23 appearances in 2014, recording a 6.97 ERA before suffering from sesamoiditis and being shut down in July for foot surgery known as sesamoidectomy. Zeid underwent the procedure to both feet, with the second foot surgery, to his left foot, taking place in October 2014. He was expected to recover three months following his surgery.

Pitching for Houston, according to Fangraphs, Zeid threw about 60% fastballs with an average velocity of 94.3 mph, in addition to sliders and an occasional changeup.

In 2014, he again pitched for Oklahoma City, going 2–2 with 7 saves and a 2.45 ERA in 17 relief appearances, as in 18.1 innings Zeid gave up 2 walks and had 21 strikeouts.

=== Detroit Tigers ===
Zeid was claimed off waivers by the Detroit Tigers on November 20, 2014. Zeid had pitched for Tiger manager Brad Ausmus on Team Israel in the 2013 World Baseball Classic qualifiers. On March 24, 2015, he was optioned to the Toledo Mud Hens of the Triple–A International League, and pitching for the Mud Hens he went 4–3 with 2 saves and a 4.46 ERA in 42 games, 4 of which were starts.

=== New Britain Bees ===
On April 7, 2016, Zeid signed with the New Britain Bees of the Atlantic League of Professional Baseball. In eight appearances (seven starts) for the Bees, he posted a 2-3 record and 5.06 ERA with 43 strikeouts across 37 1/3 innings pitched.

=== New York Mets ===
On June 10, 2016, Zeid signed a minor league contract with the New York Mets. He made his debut for their Double–A affiliate, the Binghamton Mets. Zeid pitched 6 2/3 innings while striking out six batters. He spent the remainder of the season pitching for Binghamton and the Triple–A Las Vegas 51s, going an aggregate 7–6 with a 4.61 ERA. Zeid elected free agency following the season on November 7.

=== St. Louis Cardinals ===
Zeid signed a minor league contract with the St. Louis Cardinals on March 21, 2017. He pitched for the Memphis Redbirds of the Triple–A Pacific Coast League, going 9-4 (his 9 wins tied for 6th-most in the league) and striking out 95 batters in 102 innings as he pitched in 33 games, starting 12 of them. He elected free agency on November 6.

== Coaching career ==
Zeid announced his retirement from professional baseball on April 5, 2018, at 31 years of age, saying "You have to throw in the mid-to-high-90s, consistently, or there’s someone 10 years younger than you who will."

In January 2019 through January 2023, Zeid was a rehab pitching coordinator and player development pitching analyst for the Chicago Cubs. He also ran the Pitch Lab in Arizona for the team.

Zeid joined the Texas Rangers organization as the pitching coach of the Frisco RoughRiders of the Double-A Texas League prior to the 2023 season.

As of July 2023, Zeid was entering his first season (2023–24) as the Pitching Coach and Pitching Analyst at San Jacinto College in Houston, Texas.

== International career; Team Israel ==
Zeid played for the Israeli national baseball team in the 2013 World Baseball Classic qualifier in September 2012, under manager Brad Ausmus. He pitched in all 3 games, earning a save in Israel's victory over Spain. His mother said: "As we watched the games ... we loved ... the nachas and kvelling that goes deep into our hearts." During the opening game, against South Africa, Zeid pitched 1.2 innings, giving up a walk on three strike outs, and was credited with a hold. During the second game, against Spain, Zeid gave up a hit and an earned run while recording a save. During the third and final game, the qualifying game, once again against Spain, he gave up a hit and two earned runs, while walking one and striking out two, in a game that Zeid was credited with the loss.

Zeid pitched for Israel at the 2017 World Baseball Classic qualifier, and had a 1.35 ERA in 6 2/3 innings. In the first game of the series Zeid threw 48 pitches over 3.2 innings, giving up 2 hits and an earned run while striking out 2. Under World Baseball Classic rules any pitcher who throws over 50 pitches cannot pitch again for four days, therefore by pulling Zeid before reaching this limit, it enabled Israel to utilize Zeid again in the tournament. During the third and final game of the tournament, Zeid was the winning pitcher, after throwing 37 pitches over 3 innings of no hit ball, while giving up a walk and recording 3 strikeouts.

Zeid again pitched for Israel, at the 2017 World Baseball Classic main tournament, in March 2017. In the first game of round one, he was the winning pitcher as # 41-ranked Israel defeated # 3-ranked South Korea, with Zeid striking out four batters in three innings. Zeid said the win was the pinnacle of his career: "This has to be it. This has to be the top, top win as a team, I think in my career. I’ve been lucky enough to be part of a couple of championships in the lower levels in the minor leagues and in high school, but nothing compares to this stage." Overall, he was 1–0 with 2 saves and pitched 10 shutout innings giving up 5 hits, including 4 scoreless innings as a starting pitcher against world # 1 Team Japan, as his fastball hit 96 mph.

Following the conclusion of the tournament, pitcher Josh Zeid was named to the 2017 All-World Baseball Classic team. In November 2019, he obtained Israeli citizenship so that he could play for Team Israel in baseball at the 2020 Summer Olympics in Tokyo.

His fastball in 2021 was approximately 92 mph.

He pitched for Team Israel at the 2020 Summer Olympics in Tokyo in the summer of 2021. He was 0–0 with an ERA of 3.12, as in three games (starts against Mexico and the Dominican Republic, and a relief appearance against South Korea) he pitched 8.2 innings and held batters to a .214 batting average.

Zeid pitched for Team Israel in the 2023 European Baseball Championship in September 2023 in the Czech Republic.

== See also ==
- List of Jewish Major League Baseball players
