= Peter Gibson (glazier) =

English craftsman

- Gibson, in front of York Minster, around 1990
- Born: 9 September 1929; York, England
- Died: 13 November 2016 (aged 87); York, England
- Known for: Glazier, conservator-restorer

Peter Gibson (9 September 1929 – 13 November 2016) was an English glazier and craftsman who was known for his work at York Minster in York, England. He was the founder of York Glaziers Trust in 1967, and was its superintendent until his retirement in 1995.

== Early life ==
Gibson was born in 1929, to Scottish father William, a private in the Royal Scots Greys, and York native Mary. The couple met after William came to York with his regiment at the conclusion of the First World War. "They had nowhere to live," Gibson said in 2009, "and they heard that some Minster properties were available. They went to see the estate agents, and asked if they could be considered, and the answer was yes."

He attended York's Nunthorpe Secondary Modern School. He left in 1945, when he was invited by Eric Milner-White, then Dean of York, to begin an apprenticeship in the Minster workshops.

== Career ==
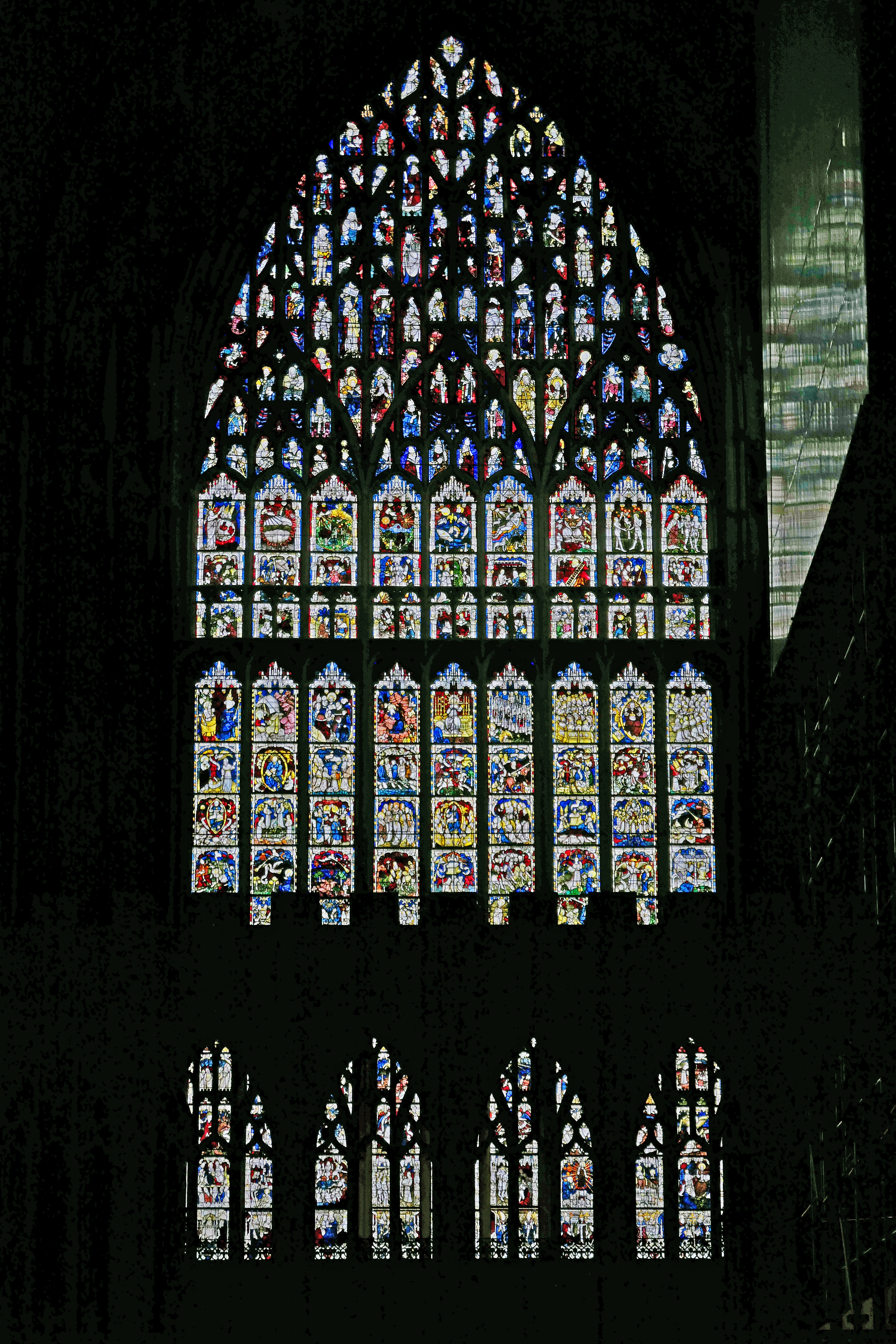
York Minster's Great East Window after its decade-long conservation project

Gibson worked on each of York Minster's more than 120 windows, jokingly referring to himself as "the Minster's window cleaner", and he twice oversaw the restoration of the rose window, once after it was almost destroyed in the great fire of 1984. Gibson's likeness is seen in a restored Tree of Jesse window in the Minster's nave. While it was being repaired in 1950, workers discovered the likeness of Jesse was missing, so an artist was commissioned to paint a new figure. Gibson, a young glazier at the time, was the only person in the workshop available to pose as a model.

He also worked on the stained-glass windows of York's St Martin-cum-Gregory's Church, St Denys's Church and (for three years) All Saints' Church.

=== Honours ===
Gibson was appointed MBE in 1984, and OBE in 1995.

In 1979, he was made a Fellow of the Society of Antiquaries of London, and became a Liveryman of the Worshipful Company of Glaziers a decade later. He was also popular in the United States, where he was made a member of the Stained Glass Association.

In 1989, Italy made him a Knight of the Order of Merit of the Italian Republic.

== Personal life ==
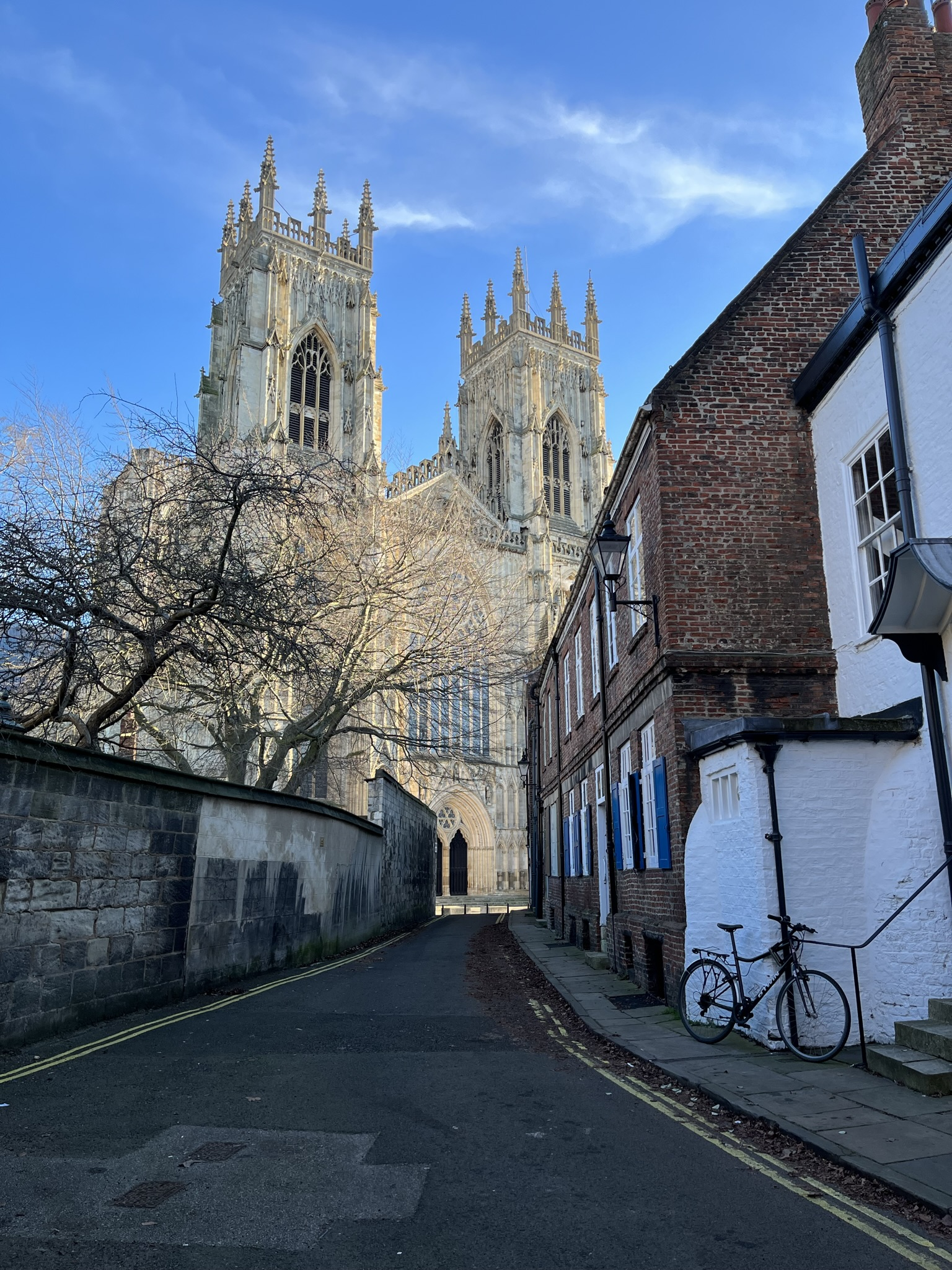
Gibson lived in the shadow of his York Minster workplace for over seventy years

Gibson lived almost his entire life on Precentor's Court. His only sibling, older sister Ellen, lived with him up until her death. "Having been brought up with someone like my sister, one gets very attached to them. Probably more so than if they had left home and married."

The Minster was visible from the sitting room, his bedroom and the attic of his Georgian cottage. "I live here, and I look out of the window, and there it is, the Minster. It is one of the greatest buildings in the world," he said. "People cross oceans, cross the world, to come and see it."

He was a lifelong member of St Michael le Belfrey Church, where he served as chorister and organ blower before being made church warden – a role he carried out for more than forty years. He received the honorary title of warden emeritus in 2008. In 2010, he was given honorary Freedom of York in recognition of his lifetime of service to the city's historical features.

=== Death ===
Gibson died in York in 2016, aged 87. His funeral took place at St Michael le Belfrey Church on 6 December 2016.

== Publication ==
In 1979, Gibson published The Stained and Painted Glass of York Minster.
