= Fritz Nathan =

Art dealer, adviser to Emil Bührle and Oskar Reinhart (1895–1972)

- Born: 30 June 1895; Munich
- Died: 28 February 1972 (aged 76); Zurich
- Occupation: Art dealer

Fritz Nathan (30 June 1895 in Munich - 28 February 1972 in Zurich) was a German-Swiss gallery owner and art dealer.

== Early life ==
Fritz Nathan was born as a son from the second marriage of Alexander Nathan; from his father's first marriage he had four much older half-siblings. His mother was Irene Helbing, the sister of the Munich auctioneer Hugo Helbing, whose father was already an antique dealer. When Nathan was 13 years old, his father died and Helbing acted as his guardian. When the First World War broke out, Nathan enrolled as a medical student and volunteered for the medical service. In 1922 he completed his medical studies with a doctorate. In the same year he married Wilhelmine Erika Heino. He joined the art shop of his half-brother Otto H. Nathan, which he continued to run alone after his death in 1930.

In 1924 the company moved to Ludwigstrasse in Munich and was named Ludwigs Galerie. Nathan was particularly interested in paintings from the German Romantic period, an era for which he was soon considered a specialist. He brokered works by Caspar David Friedrich to collectors and museums, including the 1930 painting Chalk Cliffs on Rügen from the Julius Freund Collection in Berlin to the Swiss collector and patron Oskar Reinhart from Winterthur, with whom Nathan had an increasingly close business relationship and friendship.

The Ludwigs Galerie also showed monographic exhibitions during these years: 1926 on Karl Philipp Fohr, 1928 on Hans Thoma, 1931 on Friedrich Wasmann (Bernt Grönvold Collection) and 1934 on Ludwig Richter. In 1929, in cooperation with the Hugo Helbing company, Nathan organized an exhibition in Berlin on German painting 1780–1850. A thematic exhibition on romantic painting in Germany and France was held in 1931 with the Paul Cassirer company, Berlin, in new premises at Brienner Strasse 46 in Munich, and an exhibition on art in the age of Goethe in 1932 with the same company in Berlin.

== Nazi persecution and Swiss art dealing ==
After the Nazis came to power, Nathan had to relocate the gallery to Ottostraße 5, after which the professional ban against Jews forced him to transfer the company to his long-term employee Käthe Thäter in 1935. In March 1936 he emigrated with his wife and three children to St. Gallen, where he had previously been commissioned to upgrade the quality of the Sturzenegger painting collection owned by the St. Gallen Art Museum. Thanks to the help of Oskar Reinhart and St. Gallen City Mayor Konrad Nägeli, Nathan received a work permit. He was able to establish himself quickly and in 1937 became a member of the Swiss Art Trade Association (1953–1963 Vice President, then honorary member). With the new environment, Nathan expanded to Swiss and French painting of the 19th century, areas in which he was soon considered one of the best experts.

== Controversy concerning Nazi-looted art and duress sales ==
During the Nazi era (1933–1945), Nathan sold many artworks that had been owned by German Jews who were fleeing the Nazis. His defenders assert that he was helping the Jewish refugees, of which he was one. However many of the families disagree with this interpretation of events, and have launched lawsuits to recover artworks they say were sold under duress. Nathan was listed by the Art Looting Investigation Unit in its Red Flag List of Names and is frequently cited as an important member of art selling networks both during and after the war.

According to the final report of the Independent Expert Commission Switzerland - Second World War (Bergier report): "Among the emigrated art dealers, Fritz Nathan was probably the most important supplier for the large private collections of Oskar Reinhart and Emil G. Bührle." He also worked with Swiss dealers like Walter Feilchenfeldt in the 1940s.

In 1948 Nathan received Swiss citizenship, in 1951 he moved with his family to Zurich, where he continued to build up Emil Georg Bührle's private collection. He also remained active for Oskar Reinhart, for whom he was able to negotiate several purchases from the estate of Otto Gerstenberg's collection, for example the painting Au Café by Édouard Manet.

Nathan's activities expanded in Zurich, he brokered works to museums in Switzerland, Germany, England and the USA as well as to a number of Swiss and foreign private collectors. After the death of his wife Erika in 1953, he married Ilse-Gabriele Nast-Kolb (1920–2016) in 1955. His son Peter Nathan (1925–2001) went on to become a Dr. phil. joined his father's art shop in 1953, Fritz Nathan remained active as a dealer until shortly before the end of his life. In 2017 his grandson Johannes ran the company in Zurich and Potsdam.

=== Lawsuits and restitution claims for art ===
Several artworks that passed through Fritz Nathan, Peter Nathan or Nathan Galleries have been the object of lawsuits or restitution claims. Some of these include:

- Rosiers sous les arbres by Gustav Klimt, bought by the Louvre from Nathan Galleries in 1980, formerly in the collection of Holocaust victim Nora Stiasny : Nathan Galleries had bought the painting from the Nazi artist Philipp Häusler, who acquired the Klimt in 1938 in ambiguous circumstances from Nora Stiasny; France restituted the painting to Stiasny's heirs in 2022
- Odalisque by Camille Corot, in the Kunstmuseum St. Gallen, formerly in the collection of Josse Bernheim-Jeune, settlement with joint donation to the museum
- Champ de coquelicots près de Vétheuil by Claude Monet, in the Emil Bührle collection, formerly in the collection of Max Emden. The Bührle collection rejected the claim.
- The Rock of Hautepierre by Gustave Courbet, at the Art Institute of Chicago, formerly in the collection of Max Silberberg, settlement in 2001 with Silberberg heir.
- Lady with Red Blouse by Adolph Menzel, in the Oskar Reinhart collection, formerly in the collector of Erna Felicia and Hans Lachmann-Mosse, expropriated from the family in 1934 and restituted by the Oskar Reinhart Foundation to the Mosse heirs in 2015
- View of Lake Altaussee and the Dachstein by Ferdinand George Waldmüller (1834) on loan by the German government to the Staatliche Kunsthalle Karlsruhe, restituted to the heirs of Hermann Eissler in 2020.

== Publications (selection) ==
Exhibition catalogs of the Ludwigs Galerie, Munich

- Carl Philipp Fohr (1927)
- Emil Lugo (1928)
- Deutsche Maler 1780–1850 (1929 in Zusammenarbeit mit der Berliner Niederlassung der Fa. Hugo Helbing)
- Hans Thoma (1929)
- Romantische Malerei in Deutschland und Frankreich (1931 in Zusammenarbeit mit der Firma Paul Cassirer, Berlin)
- Sammlung Bernt Grönvold, Werke von Friedrich Wasmann u. a. (1932)
- Deutsche Kunst im Zeitalter Goethes (1932 in Zusammenarbeit mit der Firma Paul Cassirer, Berlin)
- Ludwig Richter (1934)

Publications of Fritz Nathan during his work in Switzerland (selection)

- Fritz Nathan: Zehn Jahre Tätigkeit in St. Gallen: 1936–1946. St. Gallen 1946.
- Fritz Nathan und Peter Nathan: 25 Jahre 1936–1961. Winterthur 1961.
- Fritz Nathan und Peter Nathan: 1922–1972. Zürich 1972.
- Fritz Nathan: Erinnerungen aus meinem Leben. Zürich 1965.

== Literature ==
- Alex Vömel, Daniel-Henry Kahnweiler, Fritz Nathan: Freuden und Leiden eines Kunsthändlers. Düsseldorf 1964.
- Hans Curjel: Nachruf in Neue Zürcher Zeitung, 2. März 1972.
- Gabriele Nathan-Nast-Kolb (1997). "Nathan, Fritz". Neue Deutsche Biographie (in German). Vol. 18. Berlin: Duncker & Humblot. p. 744. (full text online).
- Esther Tisa Francini, Anja Heuss, Georg Kreis: Fluchtgut – Raubgut. Der Transfer von Kulturgütern in und über die Schweiz 1933–1945 und die Frage der Restitution. Zürich 2001, ISBN 3-0340-0601-2.
- Jörg Krummenacher: Flüchtiges Glück. Die Flüchtlinge im Grenzkanton St. Gallen zur Zeit des Nationalsozialismus. Zürich 2005, ISBN 3-85791-480-7.
- Götz Adriani (Hrsg.): Die Kunst des Handelns. Meisterwerke des 14. bis 20. Jahrhunderts bei Fritz und Peter Nathan. Ausstellungskatalog, Kunsthalle Tübingen, Ostfildern 2005, ISBN 3-7757-1658-0.
- The Path of Art from Switzerland to America from the Late 1930s to the Early 1950s Laurie A. Stein Declassified Swiss government report detailing traffic in Nazi looted art through Switzerland
