= Stained Glass Association of America =

The Stained Glass Association of America (originally The National Ornamental Glass Manufacturers Association) is a trade association formed in 1903 to protect the United States ornamental and stained-glass industry from foreign competition by cheaper European glass imports. The organisation campaigned for decades for high import taxes to be imposed on European glass which was much cheaper than U.S. glass due to the much lower wage costs in Europe, which they described as "unfair competition".

The Association published a journal, The Stained Glass Quarterly (formerly Stained Glass, the Bulletin of the Stained Glass Association of America, The Ornamental Glass Bulletin and The Monthly Visitor).

== See also ==
- Peter Gibson, honorary member of the Association
- Montague Castle
