= Jean-Jacques Duval =

French-American painter (1930–2021)

- Known for: Stained glass design, sculpture, painting
- Movement: Abstract Expressionism
- Awards: 2005 Lifetime Achievement Award, Stained Glass Association of America 1999 Artist Award, New York State Council on the Arts
- Website: Duval Studio

Jean-Jacques Duval (Feb. 8, 1930 - Oct. 21, 2021) was a French-born American artist who pioneered abstract art and the use of faceted glass in stained glass design in the 1960s. In 2005 he was awarded the Lifetime Achievement Award by the Stained Glass Association of America. Best known for his window designs in Germany, Israel, Japan, the West Indies, and the United States, his paintings and sculptures have also been exhibited throughout North America.

== Early life ==
Jean-Jacques Duval was born in 1930 in Strasbourg, France. At age six, his father, a manager of a champagne company, died and Duval and his mother moved to Mutzig to live with his grandmother and two uncles. Encouraged to draw by one of his uncles, a house painter, at age 14 he was introduced to a glass painter and became interested in glass as an artistic medium. He attended the Strasbourg art school École des Arts Décoratifs where he studied drawing, painting, set design and fashion. Introduced by a professor to liturgical stained glass design, following graduation Duval apprenticed with stained glass firm OTT Frères. At age 18, he left to complete his required military service and served for 15 months in the French army. Returning to Strasbourg in 1950, Duval accepted an offer to design for an American stained glass company, Muller Studio.

In the United States Duval first worked in Florida, before accepting a position at Daprato Studio in New York. In 1955 he was drafted and served two years in the US army in Germany. Upon his return he continued to freelance at Daprato until 1957 when he opened his own studio in Manhattan. Assisted by his studio foreman, Helmut Schardt, Duval began working in faceted glass in 1958. During this period he attended the Art Students League of New York.

== Career ==
Duval was one of the first stained glass designers to use Dalle de verre, a thick, faceted glass created with a hammer and anvil rather than cut. He is credited for "developing, refining, and putting his personal touch on both aesthetic approach and improved technique." Inspired by the lyrical abstraction of Nicolas de Staël's paintings, he was also one of the first to introduce an abstract aesthetic into ecclesiastic settings. His use of both transparent and translucent glass allowed nature or the surrounding environment to be included in his designs. His choice of faceted- or cut-glass was determined by the building design and, throughout his career, Duval worked equally within the two media. He described his techniques in Working With Stained Glass, first published in 1972.

1957: In 1957 Duval entered and won the international competition for the windows of the Vatican Pavilion at the 1964 New York World's Fair, now in St. Mary's Church (Groton, Connecticut). Another early abstract design, the 1962 sanctuary windows for Congregation B'nai Jacob (Woodbridge, Connecticut), was likened to windows by Robert Motherwell. In 1964 he was commissioned to design windows for the historic monument, St. Martin Church in Martenhöhe, Germany. Duval also created stained glass sculptures for the chapel at Holy Cross High School (Waterbury, Connecticut) in 1965 and for the Altman and Wolf Equitable Building (Baltimore, Maryland) in 1968.

During this period Duval continued to paint and developed a style which reflected his use of stained glass. Encouraged by artists Willem de Kooning and artist-stained glass designer Adolph Gottlieb, both friends of his wife, writer Elga Liverman Duval, he was part of the 1950s New York art scene. In 1967, he exhibited at the Madison-Avenue gallery La Boetie.

1970: In 1970 Duval moved from Manhattan to Carmel, New York. During this period he designed liturgical windows for the historic monument B’nai Israel (Pittsburgh) and Christ the King Lutheran Church (North Olmstead, Ohio). Other commissions included the Fine Arts Building, State University of New York (Geneseo) and a window for Pennsylvania State University (Altoona). During this period, he taught stained glass at the New School for Social Research in New York City.

1990: In 1992 Duval moved upstate where the Adirondack scenery became a source of inspiration for his work. Important commissions within the region include the Champlain Valley Physicians Hospital Chapel and the Fine Arts Building, State University of New York (Plattsburgh). In 1998, Duval designed the window for the Kasugai Mall (Nagoya, Japan). His largest, leaded stained glass wall to date, the stylized figurative design was inspired by a Japanese wedding.

In 2010 Duval completed a sculpture for the Holocaust Museum, State University of New York (Plattsburgh). During this time solo exhibitions of his paintings and sculpture were held in 2012 at gallery Beaux-arts des Amériques (Montreal) and at the Plattsburgh State Art Museum in 1213.

Until his death on Oct. 21, 2021, Duval lived and maintained Duval Studio in the Adirondack community of Willsboro, New York.

== Recognition ==
As a stained-glass designer, Duval completed over 500 commissions in France, Germany, Israel, Japan, the West Indies, and the United States. His work was featured in cover stories in Progressive Architecture (Dec 1971), TWA Ambassador Magazine (Jan 1972), Intellectual Digest (Feb 1973), Faith & Form (winter 1993–94, and fall 1997), Topia Magazine (fall 1997), and Art Glass Magazine (Mar-Apr 2012), and was reviewed in Stained Glass Quarterly (2005). Architectural historian Samuel Gruber wrote that "Duval has demonstrated this talent for making architectural walls that complement the architecture design in many synagogue and church commissions". Gruber also praised, in particular, Duval's concept for the Congregation of B'nai Jacob (New York City) as being "firmly within the Jewish symbolic 'canon'". His 1968 window design for the new Church of Christ (New York City), awarded the top prize by the American Association of Architects, was described in 1979 by critic Paul Goldberger as "surprisingly successful" and an "attempt to rise above the ordinary that is all too rare in New York".

In recognition for outstanding service and contributions to the arts, in 1999 Duval received the Artist Award from the New York State Council on the Arts. In 2005 he was also presented with a Lifetime Achievement Award by the Stained Glass Association of America for "his outstanding work as one of the pioneers of the faceted glass movement in the United States and for his innovation in glass art." In 2011 Duval was invited by the American Chamber of Commerce in Canada (AMCHAM) in association with the United States Embassy to speak in Ottawa, Canada. The event took place on October 25, 2011, at the Canadian Museum of Nature and was attended by over 200 people. In 2012 he was interviewed for the show Spotlight by Paul Larson of Mountain Lake PBS at his Montreal solo exhibition held at Beaux-arts des Amériques. In 2013, The Plattsburgh State Art Museum held a solo exhibition of his paintings, sculpture, and glass-installation studies in Plattsburgh, New York.

Throughout Duval's career his stained glass designs, sculptures, and paintings were featured in solo exhibitions in public museums and associations including the French Embassy (New York City), The Artist Guild of New York (New York City), the Arts Council of New York (New York City), Museum of Contemporary Crafts (New York City), Rochester Memorial Art Gallery (Rochester, New York), Lake Placid Arts Center (Lake Placid, New York), the North Country Cultural Center For The Arts (Plattsburgh, New York), Museum of Allentown (Allentown, Pennsylvania), the Arts Club of Chicago (Chicago, Illinois), and the Pavilion des Arts (St-Jean sur Richelieu, Quebec, Canada).

== Public art ==
Stained glass windows
- Congregation B'nai Jacob, Woodbridge, CT (1962)
- Mishkan Israel, Hampten, CT. (1962)
- St. Martin, Martenhöhe, Germany (1964)
- Church of Christ, New York, NY (1966)
- Catholic National Shrine in Washington, DC (1966)
- Chapel, FBI Academy, Quantico, VA (1966)
- The Prince of Peace chapel, Aspen, CO (1968)
- B’nai Israel (historic monument), Pittsburgh, PA (1971)
- Christ the King Lutheran Church, North Olmstead, OH (1972)
- Fine Arts Building, State University of New York, Geneseo, NY (1972)
- Pennsylvania State University, Altoona, PA (1973)
- St. Leo the Great, Fairfax, VA (1984)
- Kasugai Mall, Nagoya, Japan (1992)
- First United Methodist Church, Brighton, MI (1994)
- Champlain Valley Physicians Hospital Chapel, Plattsburgh, NY (1997)
- St Mark's Roman Catholic Parish, Long Valley, NJ (2002)
- Fine Arts Building, State University of New York, Plattsburgh, NY (2005)
- Holy Family Cathedral Antigua, West Indies
- Bezalel Museum, Billy Rose Collection, Jerusalem, Israel
Stained glass sculptures and painting
- Holy Cross High School Chapel, Waterbury, CT (1965 Sculpture)
- Altman and Wolf Equitable Building Baltimore, MD (1966 Sculpture)
- Holocaust Museum, State University of New York, Plattsburgh, NY (2010 Sculpture)
- Museum of Fine Arts, Springfield, MA (Sculpture)
- Haddasah Hospital, Jerusalem, Israel (Painting)
- US Embassy, Tokyo, Japan (Painting)
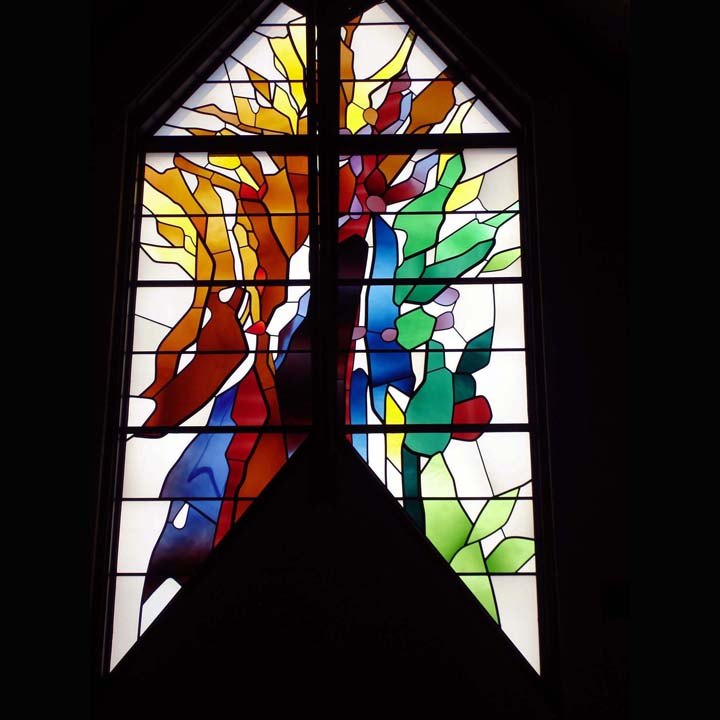
Cherry Hill Church, Highland Ranch CO

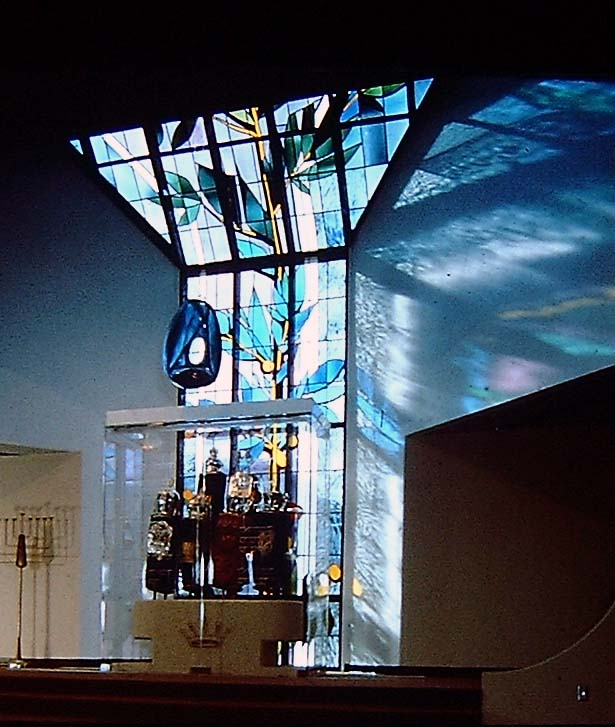
B'nai Zion, El Paso TX

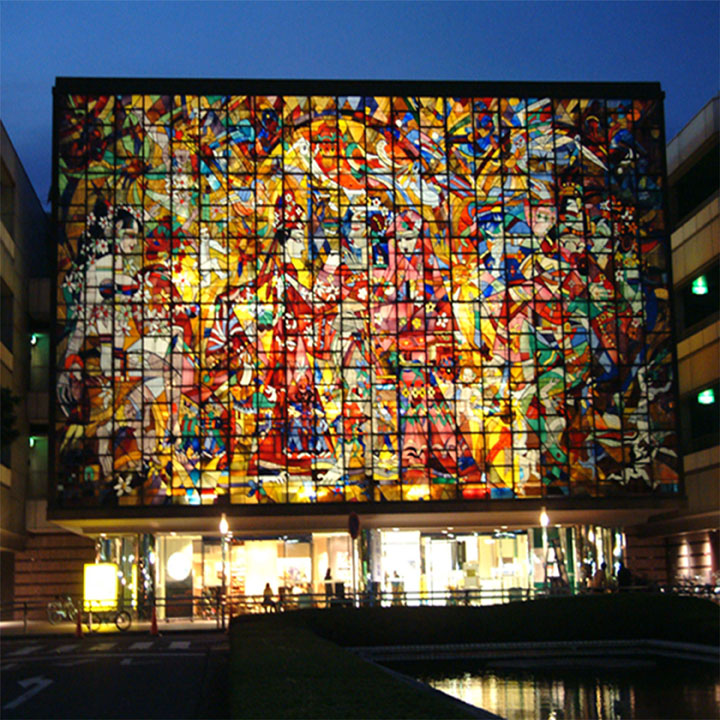
Kasugai Mall, Nagoya, Japan

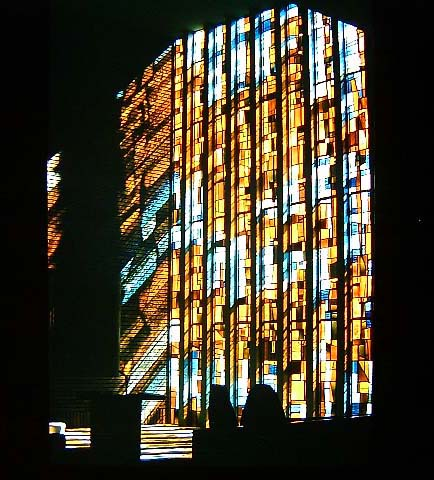
Mishkan Israel, Hamden CT

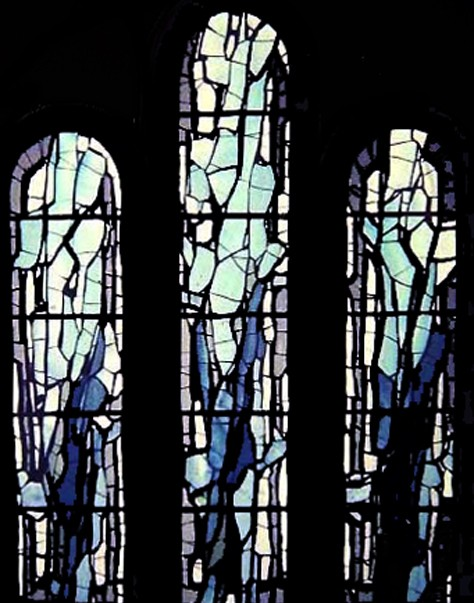
St. Martin, Martenhöhe, Germany

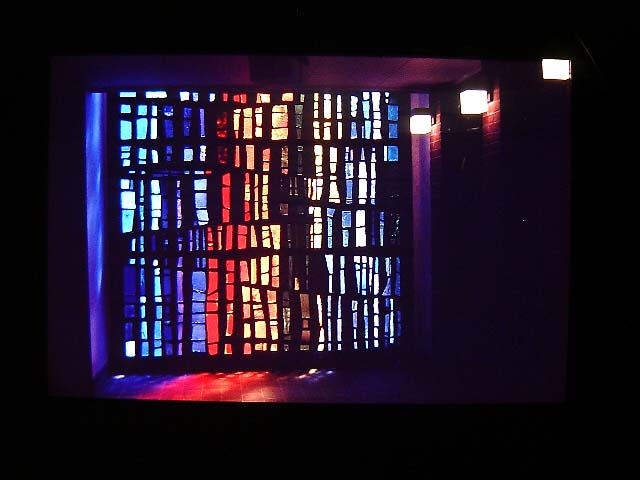
Fine Arts Building, SUNY, Geneseo NY

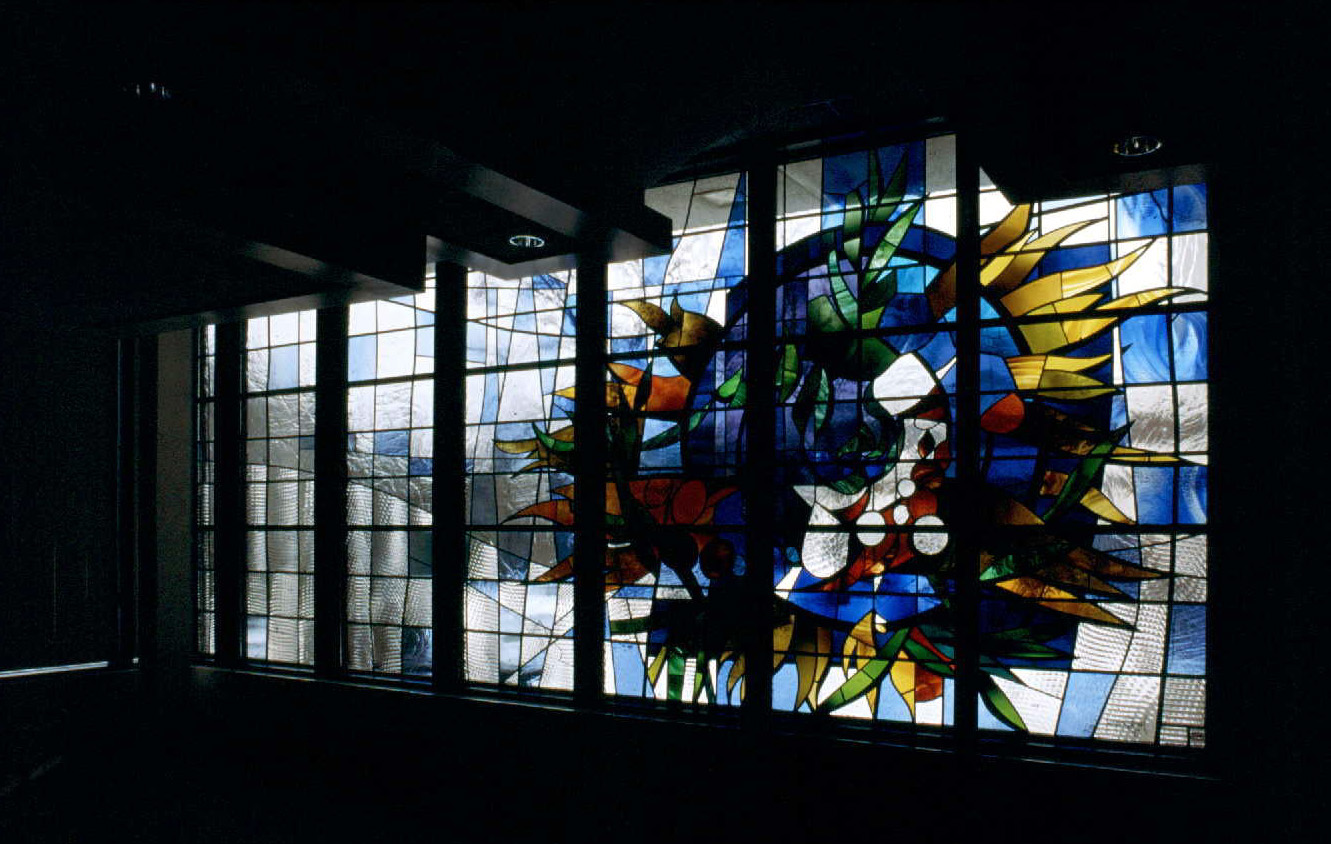
Champlain Valley Physicians Hospital Chapel, Plattsburgh NY

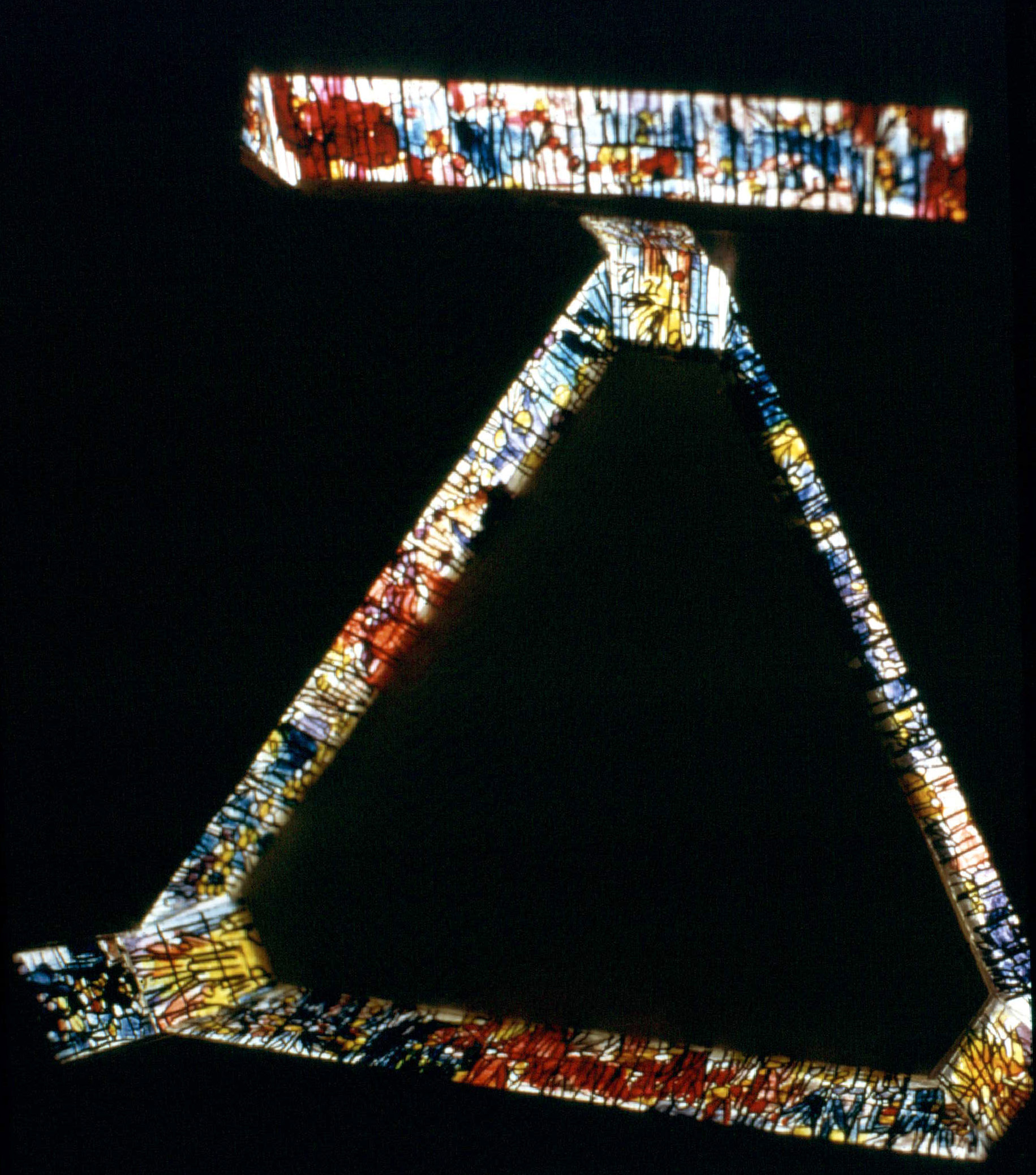
CTK Lutheran Church, North Olmstead OH

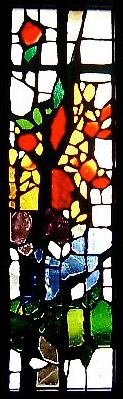
United Methodist Church, Brighton MI

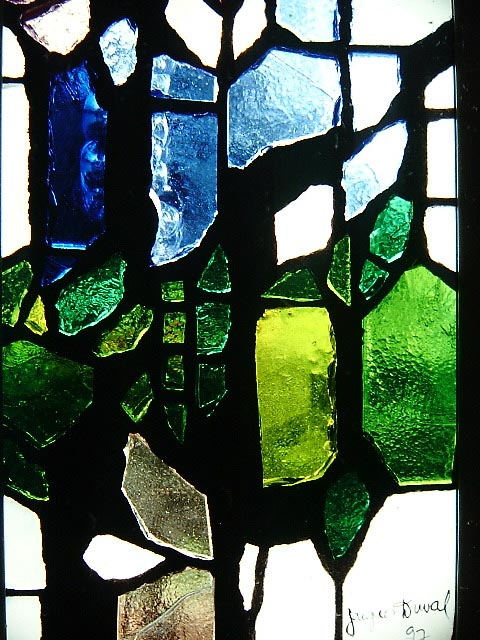
Detail dalle de verre

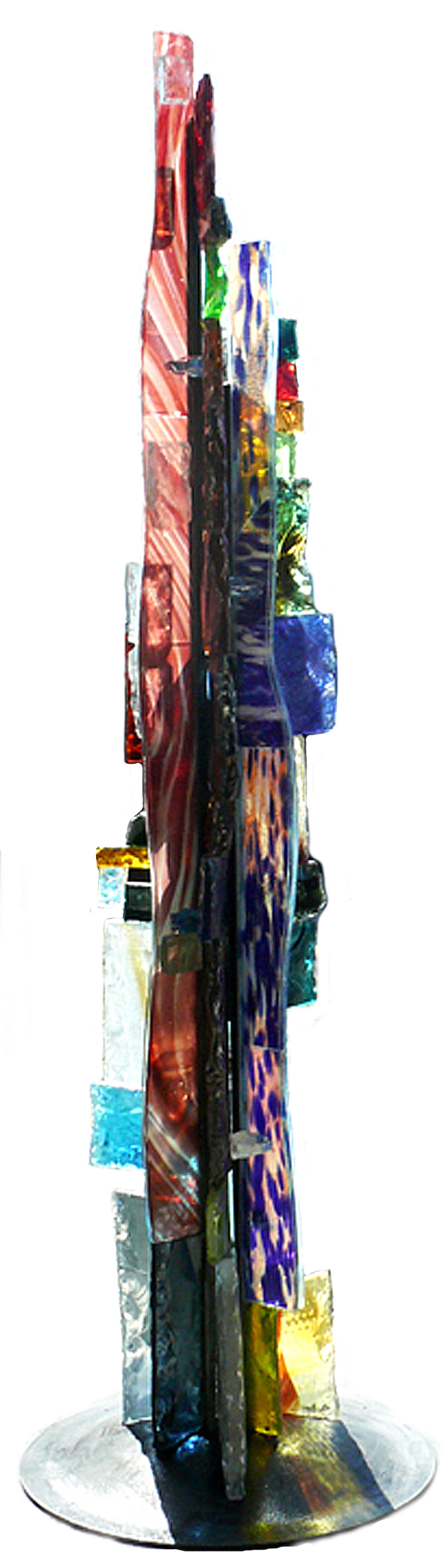
Holocaust Museum, SUNY, Plattsburgh NY

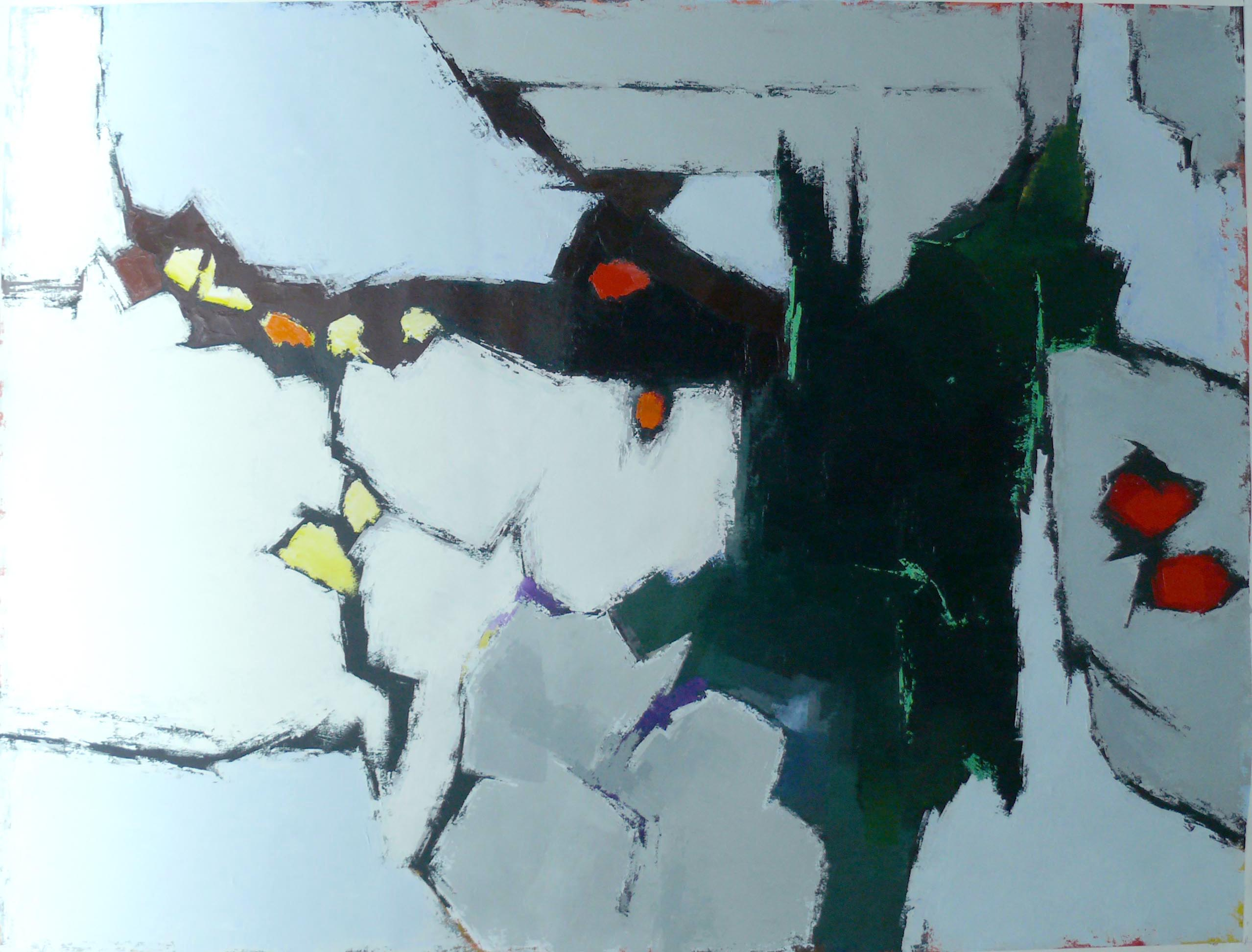
Painting 2013-07
