= Skynex =

Short-range anti-aircraft defence system

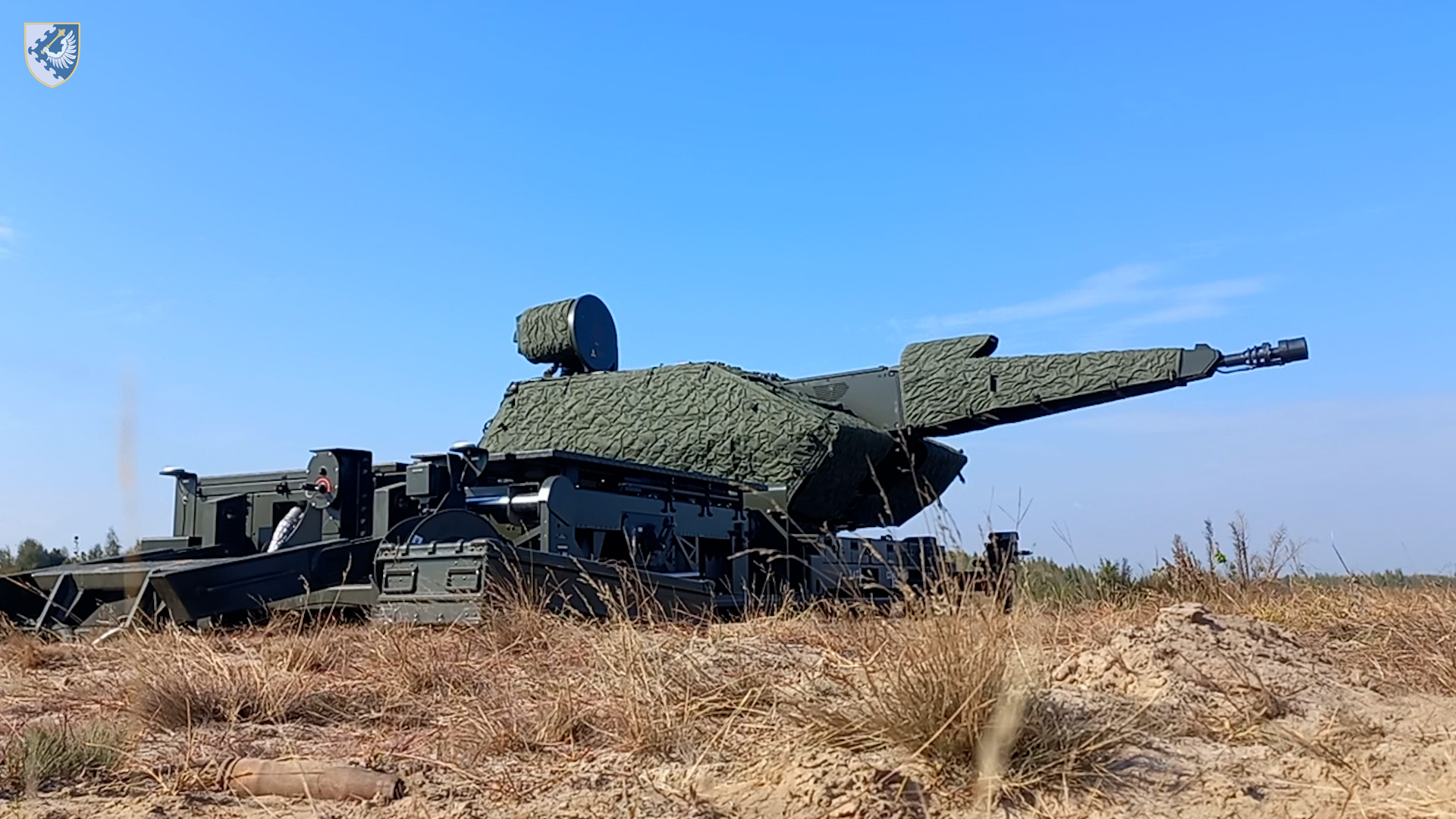
Skynex platform in use in Ukraine

The Skynex is a point-defence system developed by Rheinmetall Air Defence AG (formerly Oerlikon). It has C-RAM and C-UAS capabilities.

The Skynex is an evolution of the Skyshield system, with the main differences being network centrism, an open network architecture, designed to use a range of weapons, and a faster addition of new effectors to the system in comparison to the older versions of it.

Among the effectors that are used with the system are:

- Oerlikon Revolver Gun Mk3 (this cannon is also used with the Rheinmetall Oerlikon Millennium Gun, Rheinmetall Oerlikon MANTIS, Rheinmetall Oerlikon Skyshield, Rheinmetall Air Defence Skyranger 35)
- Twin Gun GDF009 TREO

From the beginning of the creation of the system, Rheinmetall Air Defence planned to add future effectors, such as air defence missiles and air defence lasers.

The system is also able to link with older Skyshield and Skyguard air defence systems.

== Equipment ==
The Skynex system is based on:

- Combat management system: Oerlikon Skymaster
- Sensors:
  - Tactical acquisition radar: Oerlikon X-TAR3D, IFF
  - Oerlikon MSU, a multi-sensor unit with a 3D AESA radar, panoramic EO sensors, IFF, sensor fusion
  - Hensoldt TwinVis (passive radar)
- Effectors (currently used):
  - Oerlikon Revolver Gun Mk3 (it is equipped with its own radar and EO sensor)
  - Twin Gun GDF009 TREO (it is equipped with its own radar and EO sensor, the same as the Oerlikon Revolver Gun Mk3)
- Potential effectors:
  - Laser: Oerlikon High Energy Laser
  - Missiles:
    - Oerlikon Skynex - Skynight missile launcher unit, it launches HALCON SkyKnight C-RAM / C-PGM missile
    - LIG / Rheinmetall C-PGM/ESHORAD missile designed to counter glidebombs

== Operators ==
=== Current operators ===
Italy (4)
4 Skynex in a static configuration were ordered in January 2025 to Rheinmetall Italia (1 firm order + 3 in option).
Deliveries:
- the first system delivered in December 2025.
Qatar
In October 2022, the Qatar Emiri Air Defence Forces revealed they had procured the Skynex, a modular air defense architecture centered around the Skymaster battle management system that can link components of the Skyshield. Rheinmetall is believed to have received a contract in October 2019 worth around €210 million (US$204 million) for an unspecified number of Skymasters, radars, and guns including AHEAD programmable air-bursting ammunition that is effective against small targets out to a range of 4 km.
A video released by the Qatari Ministry of Defence showed eight 35 mm Revolver Gun Mk3s and one X-TAR3D target acquisition and tracking radar.
Ukraine (2)
In December 2022, a German government spokesman said that Rheinmetall would provide two Skynex systems to Ukraine as part of assistance during the 2022 Russian invasion of Ukraine. Valued at approximately €182 million ($192 million), Germany would pay for the cost involved. The Skynex air defense system is based on a concept that keeps airspace surveillance separate from the effectors, only requiring a tracking unit to link a C2 network with different weapons. Each Skynex system comprises four Revolver Gun Mk3 cannons, a CN-1 control node, and an X-TAR3D radar all mounted on HX trucks.
Deliveries:
- the delivery of the first was announced in January 2024
- the second Skynex system was delivered by Germany in April 2025

=== Future operators ===
Romania (7)
Romania ordered 7 Skynex systems to Rheinmetall Italia SpA in May 2026, the contract is part of a common order with 24 Skyranger 35, and 2 Millenium systems.
Each fire unit is equipped with:
- 6 Oerlikon Revolver Gun Mk3 (total 42)
- CN-1 control node
- Upper echelon command point
Unknown customer (4)
In July 2026, Rheinmetall announced the sale of 4 systems to an international customer.

== See also ==
- Oerlikon GDF
- Rheinmetall Air Defence MANTIS
- Rheinmetall Air Defence Skyshield
- Rheinmetall Air Defence Skyranger 35
- Rheinmetall Air Defence Skyranger 30
