= ZAK-30 Citadel =

Russian short-range anti-aircraft artillery system

ZAK-30 "Citadel"
- ZAK-30 Citadel at the 1st International Security Forum, May 2026
- Type: Anti-aircraft artillery system
- Place of origin: Russia

Service history
- In service: 2026–present
- Used by: Russia

Production history
- Designer: Rostec
- Manufacturer: Rostec

Specifications
- Crew: 5
- Caliber: 30 mm
- Elevation: −10° to +60°
- Traverse: ±150°
- Maximum firing range: 1,000 m (3,300 ft) (fixed-wing UAVs); 800 m (2,600 ft) (multicopters)

ZAK-30 "Citadel" (Russian: ЗАК-30 «Цитадель») is a Russian short-range anti-aircraft artillery system developed by the state corporation Rostec. It is built around a stationary, remotely operated turret armed with a 30 mm autocannon firing programmable air-burst ammunition, and is intended to protect fixed sites such as oil refineries, depots and airfields from multicopter and fixed-wing drones.

The system was presented to Dmitry Medvedev, deputy chairman of the Security Council, in April 2026 and shown publicly for the first time at the 1st International Security Forum near Moscow in May 2026. Rostec says the system has been tested in real conditions, and Russian state media reported in October 2026 that it had been placed on combat duty against Ukrainian drones; these claims have not been independently verified.

A mobile version on Ural trucks has been reported by TASS, comprising several firing vehicles and a separate radar vehicle, and Rosoboronexport announced in September 2026 that the system would be shown abroad for the first time at the El Alamein International Airshow in Egypt.

== Development ==
Rostec developed the system under the name "Citadel" as a specialised counter-drone artillery system for static targets. It was shown to Dmitry Medvedev in April 2026, before its public premiere at the 1st International Security Forum, held at the Live Arena venue in the Moscow region from 26 to 29 May 2026 under the auspices of the Russian Security Council. At the unveiling Rostec stated that the system's "high performance" had been "proved in real conditions".

The system's programmable 30 mm air-burst round was first disclosed by Rostec in February 2025, and programmable ammunition for the system was displayed at an arms exhibition in Saudi Arabia in early 2026.

On 30 May 2026 TASS reported, citing a source in the defence industry, that a mobile version was planned on a Ural truck chassis, with several trucks carrying combat modules and a separate vehicle carrying a radar.

== Design ==
=== Configuration ===
The turret on its fixed pedestal at the ISF 2026 exhibition, with the electro-optical sight above the gun

The ZAK-30 is a stationary, unmanned turret mounted on a fixed pedestal rather than on a vehicle. It is controlled remotely from a command post that can be located up to 1 km (0.62 mi) away, and the crew numbers five. Rostec advertises round-the-clock operation. The turret traverses 150 degrees to either side of its centreline and elevates from −10° to +60°.

Sources differ on the ammunition load: Militär Aktuell and Defence Blog report 250 rounds carried on the gun, while TASS reported 300 rounds per combat module.

=== Armament and ammunition ===
The turret is armed with a 30 mm autocannon, which ZBiam reported to be a 2A42 adapted to fire programmable air-burst ammunition; the cartridge is of the 30×165 mm type.

The projectile is filled with shrapnel and fitted with a remotely controlled fuze. Rather than requiring a direct hit, the fire-control system calculates the most advantageous point of detonation on the target's flight path and programs the shell to burst there, creating a cloud of fragments. Rostec says this requires significantly fewer rounds per target than conventional cannon ammunition.

According to Militär Aktuell, the Russian system differs from Rheinmetall's AHEAD ammunition, which is programmed as the shell leaves the muzzle: the Citadel's shells are reportedly measured by Doppler radar and set or triggered by laser in flight. The same analysis identified the in-flight programming as a potential vulnerability to electronic warfare.

=== Sensors and fire control ===
Rostec states that the system uses radar and electro-optical detection and tracking, with the optical channel operating in the visible and infrared bands, and that the engagement sequence from detection to destruction is highly automated. Photographs of the turret show an electro-optical sight mounted above the gun, but no clearly integrated radar; Defense Express suggested that target designation may be provided by external sensors or a wider air-defence network. An Italian analysis described radar and electro-optical data fusion, track-while-scan operation, ballistic computation and a human role limited to authorising fire.

=== Performance ===
TASS reported an engagement slant range of up to 1,000 m (3,300 ft) against fixed-wing drones and up to 800 m (2,600 ft) against small multicopters. Detection ranges were given as 2,000 m (6,600 ft) against fixed-wing drones and 1,000 m (3,300 ft) against multicopters.

== Operational history ==
Rostec has said that the system was tested in real conditions and proved effective against various types of drones, without giving details. During the Center-2026 strategic command-and-staff exercises, held from 28 September to 3 October 2026, Russian state media reported that the system had been tested in a field environment. Krasnaya Zvezda subsequently reported that crews had been placed on combat duty, that two rounds were sufficient to destroy a fixed-wing drone, and that one crew had destroyed more than 40 air targets during a single duty. The newspaper also claimed that two rounds destroyed an FP-5 "Flamingo" cruise missile flying at an altitude of 100 m (330 ft) and a speed of 500 km/h (310 mph).

== Analysis ==
The ZAK-30 has been described as a conceptual counterpart to the German Skynex system and the Skyranger 30, both of which use programmable air-burst ammunition against drones. Militär Aktuell noted that Rheinmetall's AHEAD ammunition, used by the Skyranger family, is programmed as the shell leaves the muzzle, whereas the Citadel's rounds are reportedly programmed in flight. The Czech outlet Armadni zpravodaj reported that the Skyranger 30's cannon can engage drones at up to 3 km (1.9 mi) and that the system can also fire missiles with a range of up to 6 km (3.7 mi), both well beyond the Citadel's stated envelope.

Army Recognition described the system as a terminal hard-kill layer intended to complement longer-range air defence and to preserve missile interceptors for higher-value threats, while warning that its effectiveness depends on secure communications, reliable target handover and the survivability of the radar vehicle.

== Operators ==
- Russia – Russian Armed Forces. The system has been offered for export through Rosoboronexport; no orders have been confirmed.

== See also ==
- Skynex
- Skyranger 30
- Pantsir-S1
- 2K22 Tunguska
