= Skyranger 30 =

Short-range anti-aircraft defence system

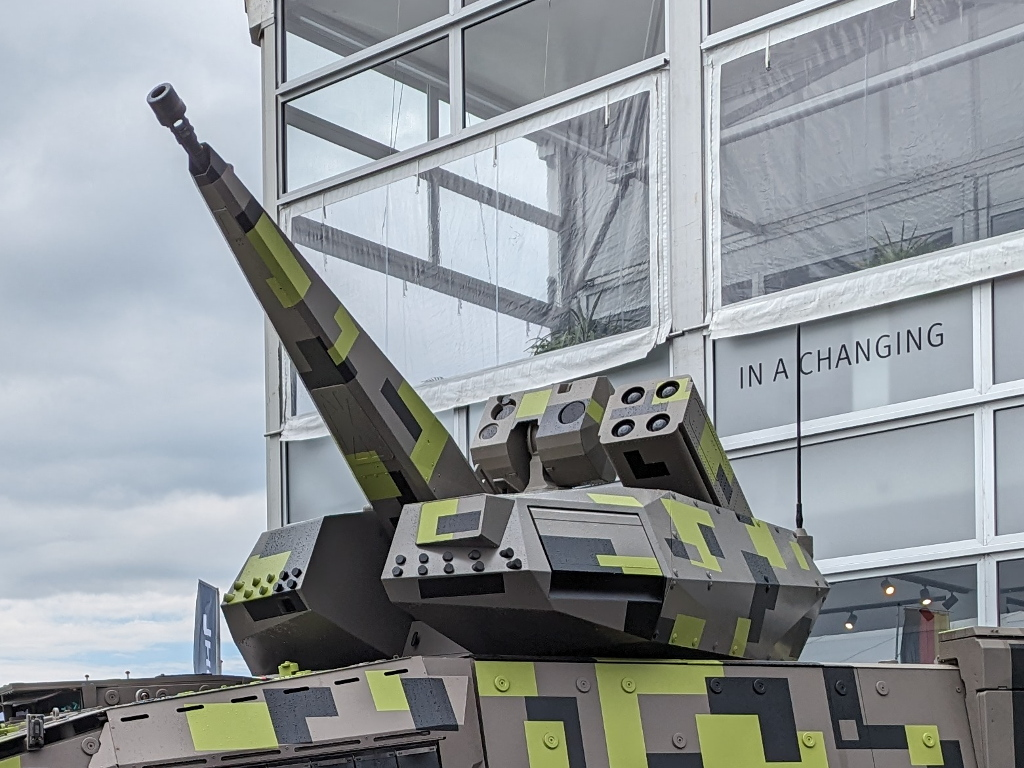
- The latest version of Skyranger 30 turret
- Type: Self-propelled anti-aircraft gun (very short-range air defence)
- Place of origin: Switzerland

Service history
- Used by: See Operators

Production history
- Designer: Rheinmetall Air Defence AG (former Oerlikon Contraves)
- Designed: 2019 – 2025
- Manufacturer: Rheinmetall Air Defence AG (former Oerlikon Contraves)
- Developed from: Rheinmetall Oerlikon Skyranger 35
- Produced: Since 2024
- No. built: 93 firm orders

Specifications
- Mass: 1.8 to 2.3 t (4,000 to 5,100 lb) (turret with ammunition)
- Length: 5.175 m (203.7 in) (turret)
- Barrel length: 2.126 m (83.7 in) (L/80)
- Width: 2.568 m (101.1 in) (turret)
- Height: 1.444 m (56.9 in) (turret with sensor)
- Diameter: 3.634 m (143.1 in)
- Crew: 2 (1 operator, 1 commander) for the turret
- Shell: AHEAD ammunition (programmable airburst ammunition)
- Caliber: 30×173 mm
- Recoil: 12,000 N (2,700 lb_{f}) with 16 mm (0.63 in)
- Carriage: See Platforms
- Elevation: -10° / +85°
- Traverse: 360°
- Rate of fire: 1,200 rds/min (nominal rate); 200 rds/min (single shots)
- Muzzle velocity: 1,075 m/s (3,530 ft/s) (with AHEAD rounds)
- Maximum firing range: Cannon: 3.0 km (1.9 mi) (effective range) Missiles: Mistral 3: 8.0 km (5.0 mi); FIM-92K Stinger: 5.0 km (3.1 mi); MBDA DefendAir: > 5.0 km (3.1 mi); SkyKnight: 10.0 km (6.2 mi) (max target altitude: 6,000m)
- Armor: STANAG 4569 Level 2, upgradable to Level 4
- Main armament: Oerlikon KCE
- Secondary armament: Among the available missiles: 9 to 12 MBDA DefendAir, 4 FIM-92K Stinger, 2 or 4 Mistral 3, or; 2 SkyKnight; Smoke grenade dispenser: 2×9 Rheinmetall ROSY smoke grenade launchers, or; 2×10 Rheinmetall ROSY smoke grenade launchers
- Guidance system: 360° AESA radar and an electro-optical sensor package

The Skyranger 30 is a short range air defence turret system developed by Rheinmetall Air Defence AG (formerly Oerlikon) and was first revealed in March 2021. Its role is to provide ground units with a mobile air defence system capable of engaging fixed and rotary-wing aircraft, Group I and II unmanned aerial systems (UAS), loitering munitions and cruise missiles.

== Development ==
Following the end of the Cold War, most Western land forces divested their mobile air defence assets. This caused a gap to appear which would leave them vulnerable as air threats returned in the early 21st century, as demonstrated during conflicts such as the Second Nagorno-Karabakh War and the Russo-Ukrainian war. To address this, Rheinmetall Air Defence developed the Skyranger 30 concept demonstrator and publicly displayed it in March 2021.

Starting in 2018, Rheinmetall Air Defence's product management department, under the leadership of Michael Gerber and Moritz Vischer, conceptually designed the Skyranger 30. An in-depth analysis by Moritz Vischer of ammunition effect, effective range, turret dimensions and cost was conducted and led to the finalization of the concept. By opting to use the 30×173mm Oerlikon KCE revolver cannon, a lighter turret design compared to the Skyranger 35 (35mmx228) turret was achievable. This allows for the integration of other air defence effectors such as SHORAD anti-aircraft missiles, high energy lasers or short range drone interceptors, thus creating a highly mobile hybrid air defence system. By including an AESA search radar into the turret and using a high-performance optical tracker all relevant air defence functions (search, track engage) are combined into one unmanned turret.

The product management department spearheaded a small dedicated development team to produce a concept demonstrator. This Skyranger 30 A0 turret concept demonstrator was used from 2020 onward for development risk reduction and marketing activities. Michael Gerber's experience in the development of the Skyranger 35, the KDG revolver gun and the Millennium naval gun flowed into the general design of the Skyranger 30. Besides being a concept demonstrator, the Skyranger 30 A0 turret was also successfully used as a platform to combine and showcase Rheinmetall's full range of capabilities and products (e.g. Rapid Obscuring System (ROSY) and Fast Infrared Search and Track Sensor (FIRST)).

Due to the COVID-19 pandemic, a live internet announcement event was conducted on December 16, 2020 to unveil the concept and turret. This was the first time such an event was used to unveil a major weapon system. At ILA 2022 Air Show in Berlin the Skyranger 30 A0 Turret was presented on a GTK Boxer.

In December 2023, the Skyranger 30 A1 development testbed was tested in live-fire exercises at the Ochsenboden proving ground in stationary and mobile modes. Total system qualification of the Skyranger 30A3 version is expected in mid-2024.

== Design ==
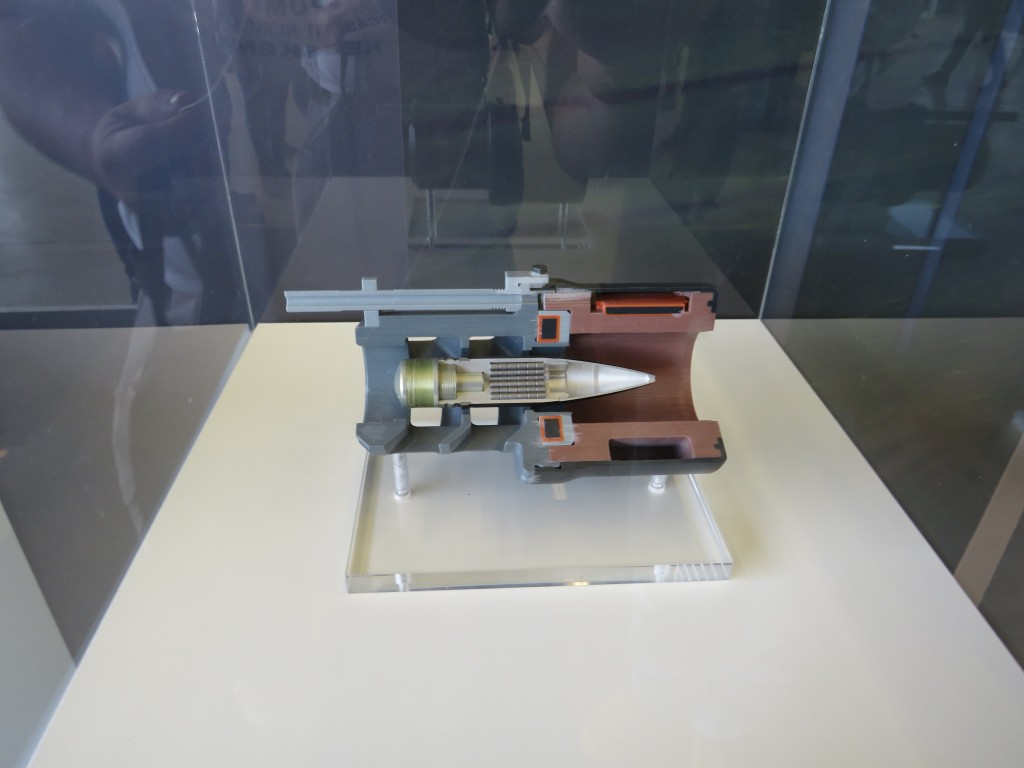
A cutaway photo of a 30 mm ABM round, showing the tungsten cylinders inside

The Skyranger 30 follows the same general configuration as the Skyranger 35, a remote turret with a 1.414 m-diameter turret ring, but with a lower weight by 2-2.5 tonnes enabling it to be installed on lighter 6×6 wheeled vehicles. The system is designed to both be operated autonomously and in networked operations.

=== Armament ===
==== Cannon ====
It is fitted with the Oerlikon KCE cannon, a modified version of the Oerlikon KCA 30 mm cannon used on the Saab 37 Viggen fighter jet. While it has a shorter effective range than the Skyranger 35 at 3 km, it has a higher rate of fire of 1,250 rounds per minute. It maintains the ability to elevate 85° to combat terminal diving targets.

===== Gun stabilisation =====
Curtis Wright Switzerland signed a contract in September 2025 to supply the gyroscopes and the power management technology that will enable to control the turret.

===== Ammunition =====
The cannon fires 30×173 mm airburst ammunition with a time fuze. The turret carries 300 ready rounds which are based on the 35 mm AHEAD ammunition.

- PMC308: This ammunition has 162 tungsten cylinders subprojectiles, they are the ones used on the Puma IFV. The ammunition carries a total of 201 grams of tungsten projectiles.
- PMC455: A new ammunition with around 500 tungsten cylinders for the same total weight that is being developed.

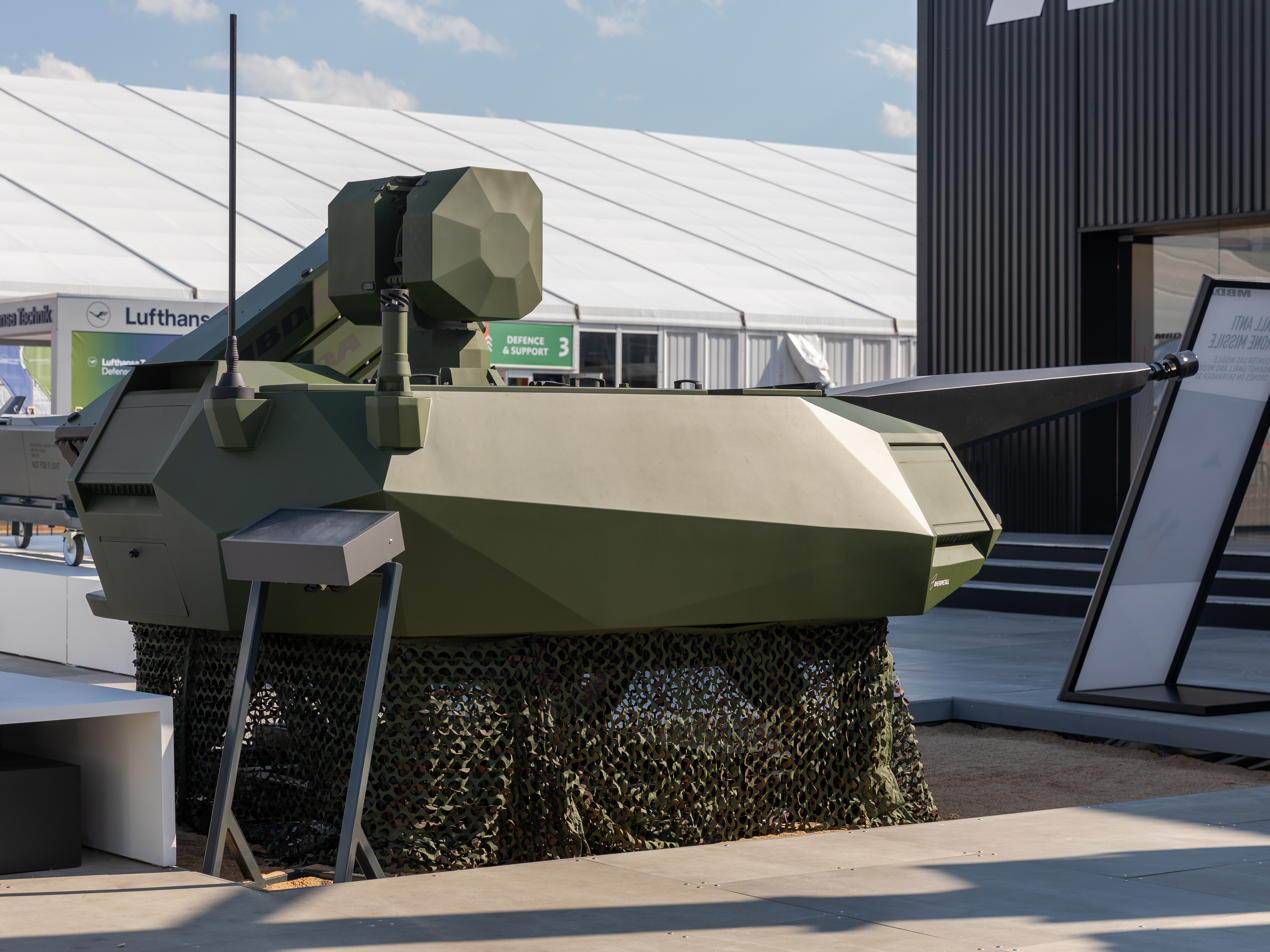
The latest version of the Skyranger 30 turret with SADM missiles. It has only three AESA radar panels for 360° coverage.

==== Missiles ====
Due to the system's reduced weight, the Skyranger 30 turret is able to integrate very short range missiles. The missiles have either an infrared homing or a laser beam riding system. From the variants unveiled, they can carry from 2 to 12 missiles.

Several options exist:

- FIM-92 Stinger: The turret is equipped with a quad-launcher. It was selected by the Dutch Army.
- Mistral-3: Renderings of this variant have shown both a dual and quad launchers. It was selected by Austrian Army, as it already operated this missile as a MANPADS. In March 2025, the Danish Army also selected this missile for its Skyranger 30.
- SkyKnight: Among the variants presented by Rheinmetall Air Defence, one offers the missile of Halcon as an option. This missile is designed to engage large artillery shells and other form of guided munitions. As of early 2025, no client selected this missile.
- MBDA DefendAir: The missile that was formerly known as the SADM (Small Anti Drone Missiles) is based on the MBDA Enforcer. Its range is about 5–6 km. This variant of the Skyranger 30 turret was presented at ILA Berlin Air Show 2024 by Rheinmetall Air Defence and MBDA Deutschland, with a launcher carrying 9 missiles. According to the information from the manufacturers, up to 12 missiles could be installed on the turret. It was selected by the German Army in May 2025, and the German Army will have 9 missiles per turret.

=== Sensors ===
==== Radars ====
- Rheinmetall Italia AMMR: It is an S-band AESA multi-mission radar with a detection range of over 20 km for a 1 m^{2} RCS aircraft, 12 km against hovering helicopters, 10 km against missiles, and 5 km against RAM targets and micro-UAS. The first shown prototype turret had five flat antennas integrated around the turret provide full 360° coverage, although four would be enough as they each have 90° field of view. The fixed variant of the Skyranger 30 ordered by the Netherlands and Belgium is equipped with this radar.
- Hensoldt Spexer 2000M 3D MkIII: It is an X-band AESA radar. The turret is equipped with three flat antennas that cover 360°. There is a smaller flat antenna on the front of the turret, presumably for target tracking. The SPEXER 2000M 3D MkIII radar's detection ranges: Light aircraft (3.0 m^{2} RCS): 27 km; Low-level helicopter (5.0 m^{2} RCS): 36 km; UAV (0.2 m^{2} RCS): 9 km, Micro-UAV: 6 km. As of early 2025, this radar was selected to be used with the German, the Netherlands, the Austrian, the Hungarian and the Danish variants.

==== Passive sensors ====
For passive detection, it includes Rheinmetall's FIRST (Fast InfraRed Search and Track), which is optimised to detect pop-up targets such as helicopters. The latest known version of the turret does not have the FIRST sensor. Identification and tracking is handled by a compact target tracker that includes one HD cooled MWIR thermal camera, one full-HD TV camera, and two laser rangefinders, one dedicated for air targets and the other for ground targets.

==== Laser range finder ====
A contract was signed with Lumibird Photonics Sweden AB in May 2025 for the supply of the Vidar laser range finder for the Skyranger 30 turret. The contract value amounts to €5 million, with deliveries from 2025 to 2028.

=== Protection ===
The turret features a central armored structure with basic STANAG 4569 Level 2 protection, which can be fitted with add-on armor to increase to Level 4.

Additional features include two ROSY (Rapid Obscuring System) launchers each with nine multi-spectral smoke grenades, a hatch in the hull ceiling for the vehicle commander to view the battlefield from outside, and a coaxial machine gun fitted on the left of the main gun for use as a self-defence weapon. According to the released photos, both the hatch and the coaxial machine gun was omitted from the final production version of the turret.

=== Future features ===
==== Reloading system ====
Rheinmetall in collaboration with EMPL (for the container construction) and Palfinger (for the robotic arm) are developing a fast reloading system from an armoured container truck, giving the capability to quickly replenish the ammo in intense combat conditions. The system is a magazine that would be replaced by an automated arm. The container would contain multiple ready-to-be-loaded magazines. The reloading vehicle would contain six magazines, and a trailer with 12 more magazines would be possible.

==== Electronic warfare ====
Additional add-ons are under consideration, including electronic warfare systems in the form of passive emitter locators to pick up UAV data link signals, as well as RF-jammers to jam such links to neutralize UAVs without using kinetic effectors.

==== High-energy laser ====
In late 2021, Rheinmetall unveiled the Skyranger 30 high-energy laser (HEL), intended to increase the system's ability to neutralize small targets at greater range and lower cost. The initial power level is 20 kW, with an immediate goal to increase it to 50 kW and an ideal goal of 100 kW.

=== Platforms ===
==== Future variants ====
- Boxer: The German Army ordered 19 systems based on the Boxer.
- Lynx: Hungary signed a contract with Rheinmetall in December 2023 to develop the Skyranger 30 based on the Lynx tracked platform. The Italian Army is also expected to order some Lynx vehicles equipped with the Skyranger 30 turret with the "Air Defence" variant.
- Pandur 6×6: The Austrian Army ordered 36 Skyranger 30 in February 2024 with an option for 9 additional systems.
- Piranha V: The Danish Army selected the Skyranger 30 system, and will equip it on their 8×8 vehicles. During trials in Switzerland, Rheinmetall presented the variant on the Piranha V.
- ACSV: The Netherlands Army selected the Skyranger 30 to be mounted on the ACSV.
- Static: The Netherlands Army's variant of the Skyranger 30 can be used statically as well. It consists of a standard Skyranger 30 turret and a lower mount, which allows the system to be used mobile on a customer’s armoured combat support vehicle or to be operated stationary from the ground. In addition to the Skyranger weapon platforms, the Dutch army has ordered tactical level control nodes and hooklift transport platforms for pure stationary deployment.

==== Potential variants ====
- M5 Ripsaw UGV: Rheinmetall presented a mock-up of the Skyranger turret on a Ripsaw unmanned vehicle in October 2023.
- Pindad Badak: It was shown with a mock-up of the turret during 2022 Indonesian Defence Exposition & Forum.

== Operators ==
=== Current operators ===
Germany (1 prototype + 18 systems)
The German Army ordered 19 systems on GTK Boxer vehicles for €595 million in February 2024 and 30 more are planned. They will be armed with Stinger missiles. The first 19 systems package includes a test vehicle, followed by 18 production vehicles. The variant of the German Army will carry 9 SADM missiles. The test vehicle was delivered to the German Army in February 2025. The production of the first order takes place in Switzerland; the future orders are expected to be produced in Neuss (Germany).

=== Future operators ===
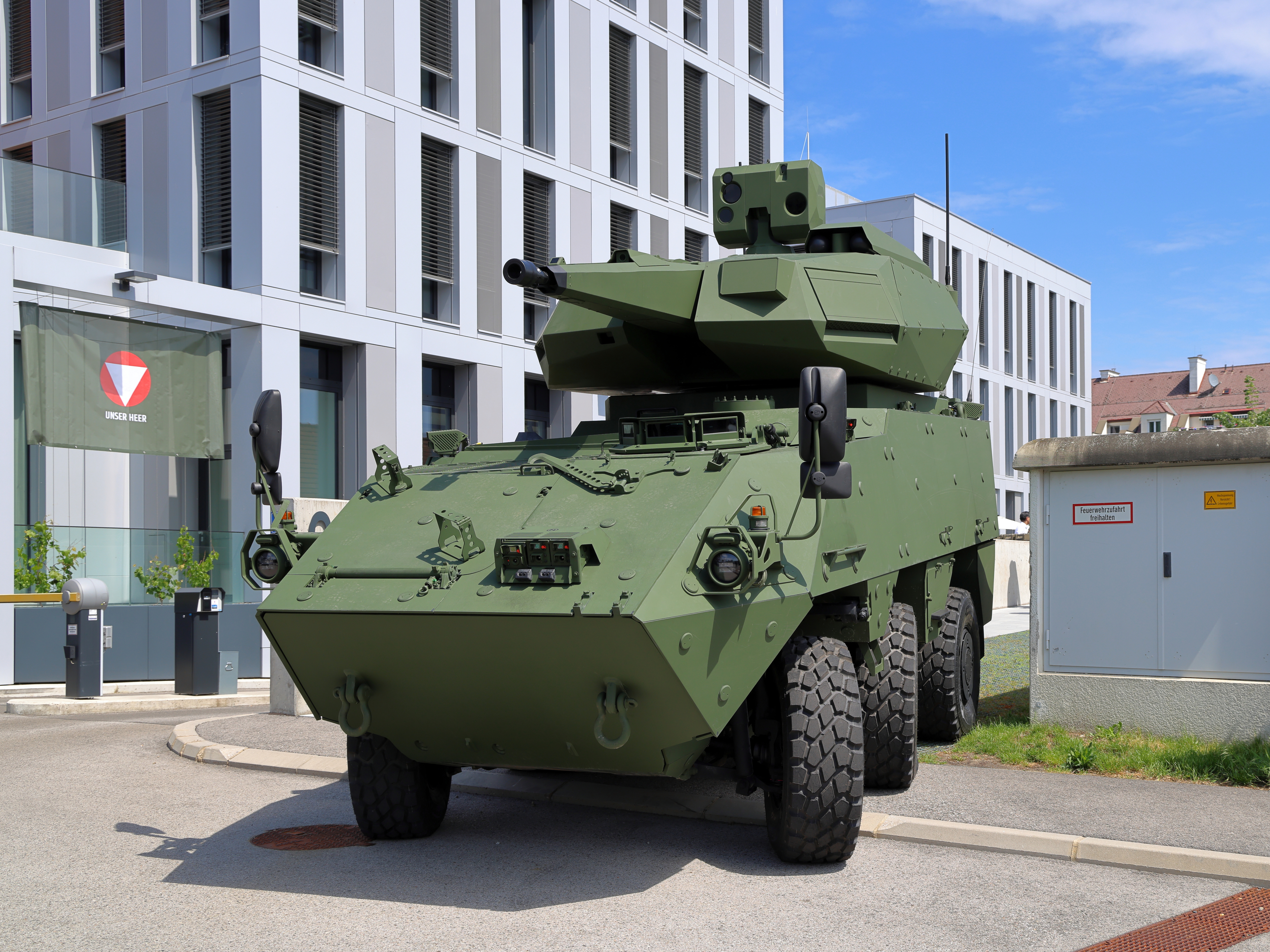
Pandur EVO Skyranger 30 of the Austrian Armed Forces

Austria (36 ordered + 9 in option)
The Austrian Armed Forces signed a contract in February 2024 for 36 systems mounted on Pandur EVO vehicles. The short-range air defence system will be delivered starting in 2026 and the turrets will be equipped with Mistral missiles. The order also includes an option for 9 additional systems. The turret of the Austrian version is one ton lighter than the standard turret and carries only two missiles due to the lower load capacity 6×6 chassis.
Belgium (20 planned)
The Belgian Armed Forces ordered 20 systems on hooklift platforms in November 2026.
The systems selected are the Static Skyranger 30, and they will be used to protect the NASAMS-3 batteries from drones.
Denmark (4 prototypes + 12 systems ordered)
The Danish Defence Acquisition and Logistics Organisation announced on 16 May 2023, that it had chosen Skyranger 30 to be mounted on Danish Mowag Piranha V, for air defence. It will be equipped with the Mistral 3 missiles.
In September 2024, the Danish authorities commissioned Rheinmetall Air Defence for 16 turrets:
- 4 prototypes and pre-production turrets to be delivered by the end of 2026
- 12 to be delivered in 2027 and 2028
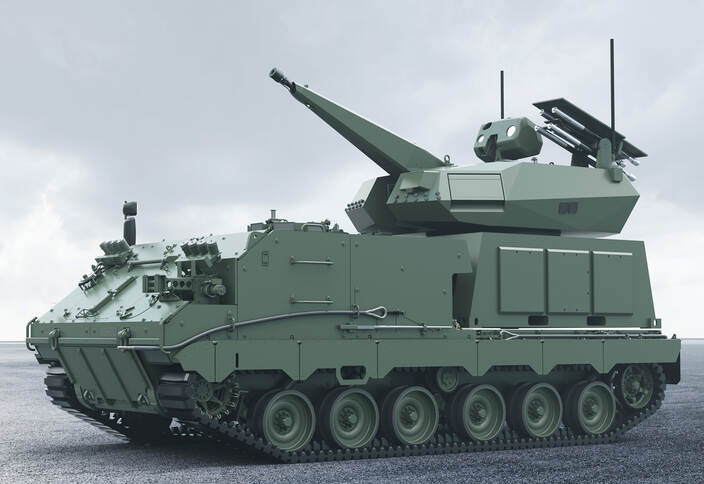
  Netherlands' Skyranger 30 on ACSV G5 chassis - the turret and its lower mount can be deployed separatly from the vehicle
Netherlands (50 - 75, unclear quantity)
The Netherlands Army planned to order 22 mobile systems initially, to be built on the Armoured Combat Support Vehicle (ACSV) tracked platform.
The contract was signed in December 2025, it includes:
- Mobile Skyranger 30 on the ACSV
- Static Skyranger 30 systems
- Training simulators
Three prototypes will be built in Switzerland; the following systems will be assembled by Rheinmetall Netherlands in Ede, with a partial production there as well.

=== Potential operators ===
Czech Republic
The Czech Army showed interest for the Skyranger 30 which was presented at IDET 2025. It might be installed on the Pandur II 8×8 Evo.
Germany (481 to 581 additional systems)
As of early July 2025, the Bundeswehr is expected to purchase 500 to 600 Skyranger 30 in total. This includes 30 full weapon packages per weapon.
In order to reach this goal, the orders would include:
- 4,500,000 to 5,400,000 (300 rounds of 30 mm AHEAD per system)
- 135,000 to 162,000 MBDA Deutschland DefendAir (9 missiles per system)
At the end of July, the government told Reuters that well over 100 systems would be ordered at the moment.
Hungary (18 planned)
The government of Hungary signed a memorandum of understanding in 2021 about developing a Lynx-based air defence vehicle, using the Skyranger 30 turrets with Mistral missiles. Rheinmetall received a development order from Hungary for the Skyranger 30 turret on the future Lynx KF41. The value of the order is €30 million and covers the integration of the Mistral missiles as well. Colonel-General Gábor Böröndi, Chief of the General Staff of the Hungarian Armed Forces, said in a late 2023 interview: "We are also planning to purchase the Skyranger system, which is suitable for destroying aerial targets and drones. We are developing it together with the Germans and the Danes, it will be ready and adopted within a year or two." This means that the Hungarian Armed Forces should receive their first Skyrangers in 2025 or 2026. According to unconfirmed press reports, Hungary plans to purchase 18 Skyranger air defence vehicles.
Italy
As part of the programme where they are planning to purchase 1,050 KF-41 Lynx, the Italian Army is planning to purchase a variant for air-defence, equipped with a cannon.
Lithuania
Under evaluation.
Portugal
It was reported on SIC Notícias that Portugal will proceed with the purchase of up to 16 systems by 2030, which will be integrated onto Boxer armoured vehicles.
Saudi Arabia
It's being considered to defend itself against the drone threats.
Switzerland
Switzerland is negotiating the purchase of Skyranger systems for the Army. A budget would still need to be approved.
United Arab Emirates
The EDGE Group is in talk with Rheinmetall as the UAE showed interest in the platform.
United States
The US Armed Forces are looking for an anti-air cannon system, and Rheinmetall offered the Skyranger 30 in August 2024. The offer includes the opportunity to manufacture it locally in collaboration with Lockheed Martin.

== See also ==
- Skyranger 35 - Same system with 35 mm autocanon
- Skynex - 35mm autocannon, can be static and on trucks
- Pantsir-S1 – (Russia)

Older vehicle mounted short range anti-air-systems

- Flakpanzer Gepard – (West Germany)
  - Type 87 – (Japan)
  - Marksman – (United Kingdom)
  - Fliegerabwehrpanzer 68 – (Switzerland)
  - PZA Loara – (Poland)
- 2K22 Tunguska – (Soviet Union)
- ZSU-23-4 Shilka – (Soviet Union)
- PGZ-95 – (China)
- K30 Biho – (South Korea)
