= Skyranger 35 =

Short-range anti-aircraft defence system

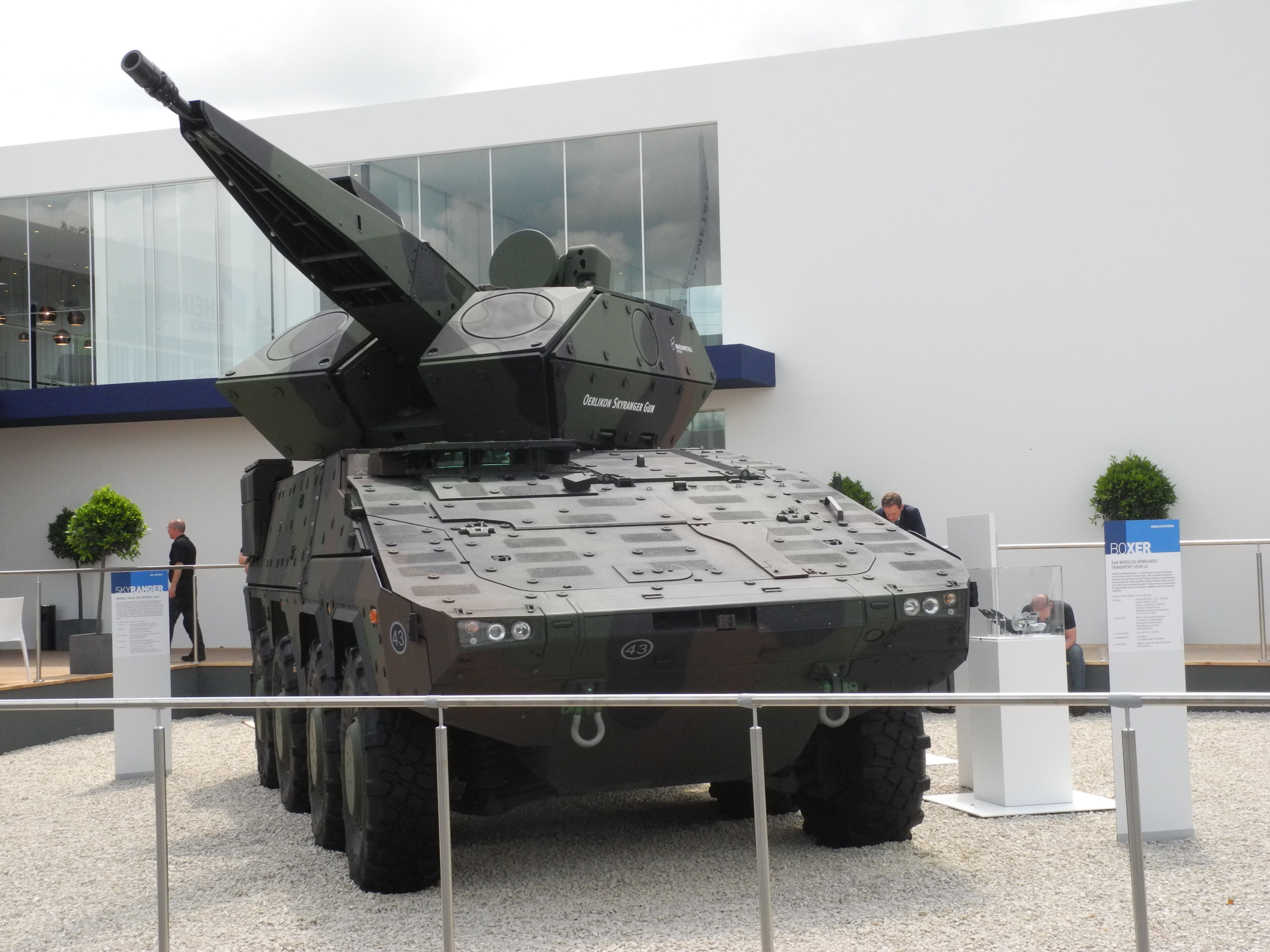
- Rheinmetall displayed a Boxer fitted with the Oerlikon Skyranger 35 air defence system at Eurosatory 2018
- Type: Self-propelled anti-aircraft gun (Very short-range air defence)
- Place of origin: Switzerland

Service history
- Used by: See Operators

Production history
- Designer: Rheinmetall Air Defence AG (former Oerlikon Contraves)
- Designed: 2004
- Manufacturer: Rheinmetall Air Defence AG; Rheinmetall Italia SpA (final assembly in Italy to escape Swiss export laws)
- Developed from: Rheinmetall Oerlikon Millennium Gun
- Developed into: Rheinmetall Oerlikon Skyranger 30

Specifications
- Mass: 3.95 t (8,700 lb) with ammunition (252 rounds)
- Length: 5.81 m (229 in) (turret)
- Barrel length: 3.15 m (124 in) (L/90)
- Width: 2.5 m (98 in) (turret)
- Height: 0.83 m (33 in) (turret without EOS), 1.63 m (64 in) (turret with EOS)
- Diameter: 3.95 m (156 in)
- Crew: 2 (1 operator of the Skymaster console, 1 commander of the C2 Interface) for the turret
- Shell: AHEAD ammunition (programmable airburst ammunition)
- Caliber: 35×228mm
- Elevation: -7° / +80°
- Traverse: 360°
- Rate of fire: 1,000 rds/min (nominal rate); 200 rds/min (single shots)
- Maximum firing range: 4 km (2.5 mi) (effective range)
- Main armament: Oerlikon Revolver Cannon KDG
- Guidance system: 360° AESA radar (S-band (IEEE)), an electro-optical sensor package (HD camera, cooled MWIR HD camera), and a laser rangefinder

The Skyranger 35 is a short range air defence turret system developed by Rheinmetall Air Defence AG (formerly Oerlikon).

== Design ==
A mobile version of the Skyshield air defense system, it is based on a turret equipped with a 35 mm revolver cannon, based on the 35/1000 revolver gun. It can be elevated up to 85° with 360° rotation. The unmanned turret weighs 4.25 tonnes loaded and is controlled by two operators inside the vehicle. The gun is optimized to fire AHEAD (Advanced Hit Efficiency And Destruction) ammunition, an airburst round that releases a cloud of sub-projectiles just ahead of a target, enabling it to engage conventional and low, slow and small (LSS) air threats, including UAVs and perform C-RAM duties.

The cannon can fire single-shots, rapid single shots at 200 rounds per minute, or at a maximum rate of 1,000 rounds per minute. It has an effective range of 4,000 m. Skyranger 35 vehicles have an integrated sensor suite, consisting of an X-band or Ku-band tracking radar with a range out to 30 km, and an EO/IR camera with a laser rangefinder and automatic target tracking. The turret carries 252 rounds. It can be mounted on various wheeled and tracked vehicles. Prototypes were integrated on the Piranha IIIH, Piranha IV and Boxer 8×8 armored personnel carriers and the Leopard 2 tank chassis.

In 2021, the Skyranger 30 was unveiled, which is a lighter version equipped with a 30 mm cannon and short-range surface-to-air missiles.

In September 2023, a new version of the Skyranger 35 system was introduced with a redesigned turret and an Oerlikon AMMR active electronically scanned array search radar. This S-band radar has a detection range of 5 km for small drones, and 20 km for fighter-sized aircraft.

Integration of the Skyranger 35 with the Leopard I platform for use by the Ukrainian armed forces is planned. This version was demonstrated in a live fire exercise in September 2024.

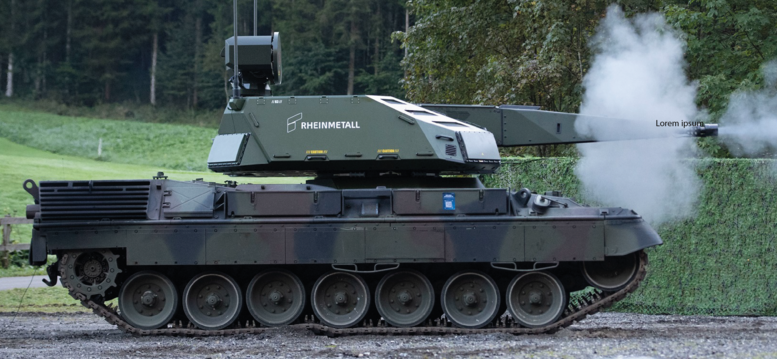
The new, production Skyranger 35 turret on Leopard 1 chassis during a live fire test

== Operators ==
=== Future operators ===
Romania (24)
Romania and Rheinmetall signed the contract for 2 batteries of Skyranger 35 in May 2026 (24 systems), they are funded by the SAFE loan initiative, and will be based on the KF41 Lynx platform.
Ukraine
A contract with Ukraine was signed by Rheinmetall in October 2025, financed by a EU nation, unknown as of October 2025. The quantity is unknown at the moment.

== See also ==
- Flakpanzer Gepard
- KORKUT
- Luftvärnskanonvagn (lvkv) 9040
- Marksman anti-aircraft system
- Nächstbereichschutzsystem MANTIS
- Oerlikon GDF
- PGL-12
- PGZ-09
- PZA Loara
- Skyranger 30
- Skyshield
- Type 87 self-propelled anti-aircraft gun
