= AHEAD ammunition =

Type of airburst ammunition

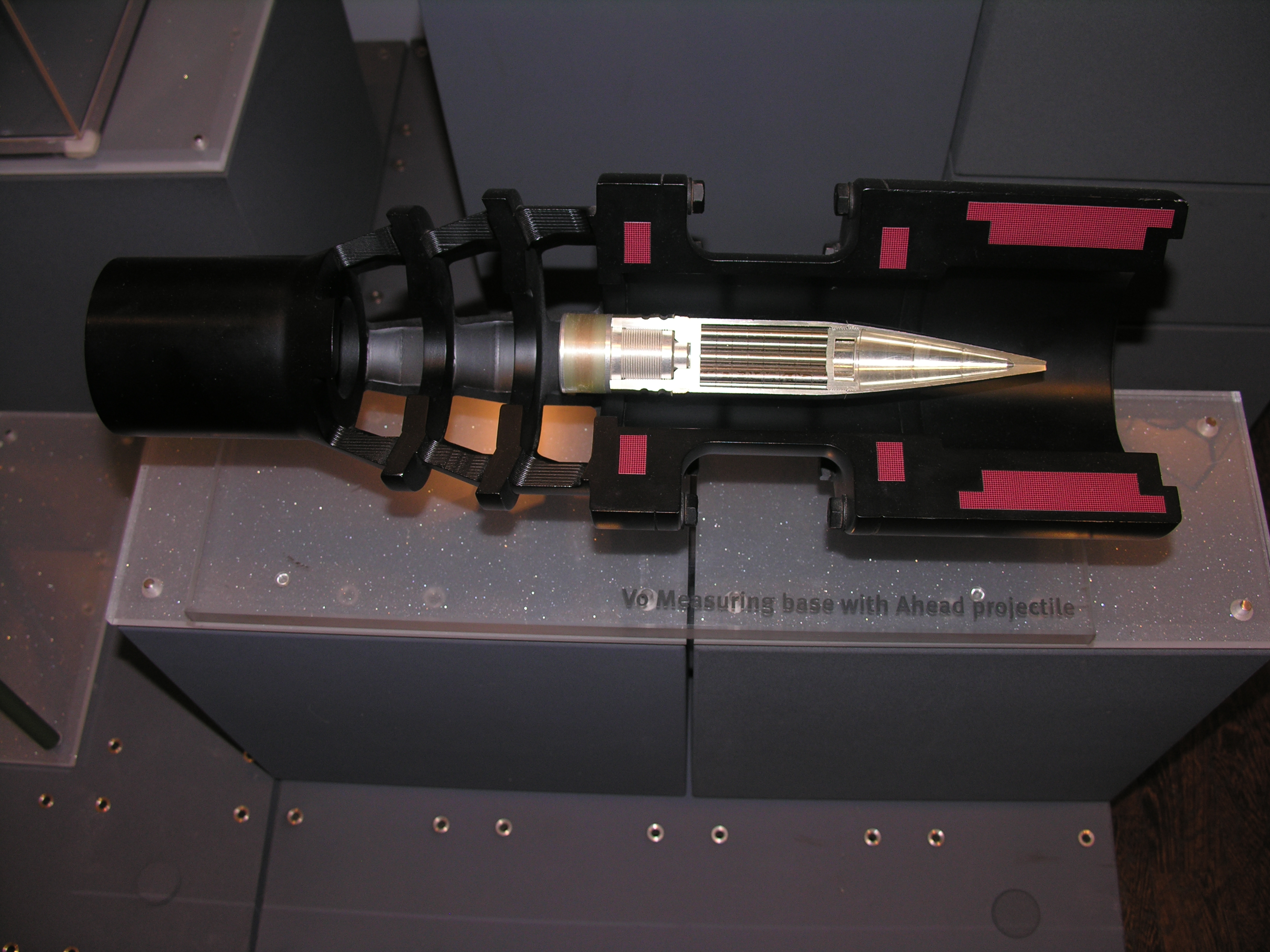
Cross section of AHEAD 35 mm ammunition

Advanced hit efficiency and destruction (AHEAD) ammunition is a type of airburst round ammunition that releases a cloud of sub-projectiles just ahead of a target, enabling it to engage conventional as well as low, slow and small (LSS) air threats including unmanned aerial vehicles and perform counter rocket, artillery, and mortar duties. The 35 mm variety produced by Oerlikon Contraves splits each projectile into 152 tungsten submunitions "that form a cone-shaped pattern to destroy a target's control surfaces and other vital components". This type of ammunition is listed as an official acronym at the British Ministry of Defence.

== Types ==
- 35 mm, payload 500 g (18 oz)
  - PMD062, original round with 152 sub-projectiles.
  - PMD330, with 407 sub-projectiles for point protection against indirect fire.
  - PMD428, with 675 sub-projectiles, for use against smaller FPV-drones and quadcopters.
- 30 mm, payload 200 g (7.1 oz)
  - PMC388, contains 162 sub-projectiles, same as used in PMD330.
  - PMC455, contains smaller sub-projectiles configured for use against smaller FPV-drones and quadcopters.

== History ==
AHEAD ammunition was developed as early as 1993.

In 2011, the government of the Republic of China in Taiwan procured a Skyguard system, which is based on the AHEAD ammunition.

In 2012, AHEAD was delivered to the Luftwaffe by Rheinmetall for their MANTIS Air Defence System.

At the 2018 Euronaval trade show, the Rheinmetall Oerlikon Millennium Gun was noted as able to fire AHEAD ammunition.

In 2018, AHEAD ammunition-capable Oerlikon revolver guns were proposed to the Egyptian Ministry of Defense by the manufacturer, in order to update its air defense system.

In January 2019, the South African National Defence Force boasted about its upgraded ability to fire AHEAD ammunition at airborne targets via a networked multi-gun emplacement.

In March 2021, Rheinmetall Air Defence unveiled the Skyranger 30, an air defense turret that uses a 30 mm gun firing a 30 mm version of the AHEAD projectile.

In June 2021, Rheinmetall tested its 35 mm revolver gun against drone swarms with the use of AHEAD ammunition. Firing PMD 428 rounds, an eight-drone swarm was neutralized with an 18-round burst, most of them being destroyed with the first six rounds.

In mid-2022, AHEAD was the subject of study by a group of Chinese scientists.

In August 2022, the munitions were listed on the scrapped purchase order for the towed air defence gun missile systems (ADGMS) of the Indian Ministry of Defence. It seemed the matter excited some controversy around this time.

In October 2022, the munitions were listed as one of the technical requirements for a gun that would be procured by the Indian MoD.

In June 2026, a Skynex air defence system in Ukraine used 35 mm AHEAD ammunition to intercept approximately 37 aerial targets. In a single combat mission, the system destroyed a cruise missile and 11 Shahed drones.

== Gallery ==
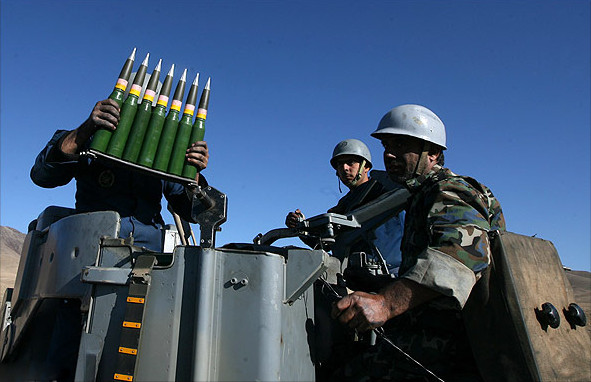
35 mm AHEAD loaded on Oerlikon twin-gun

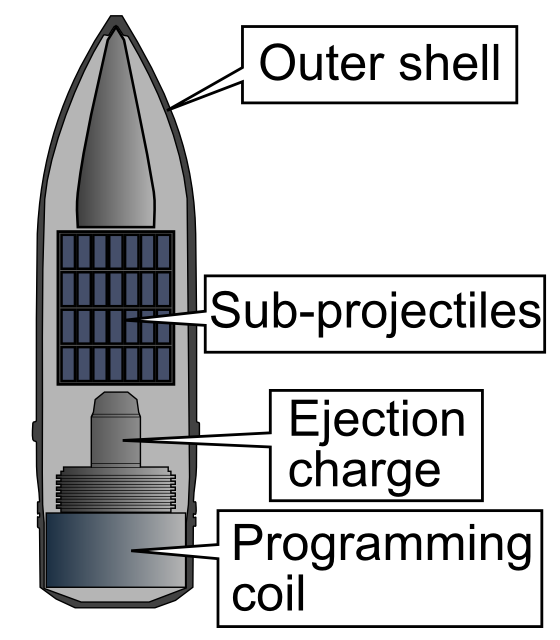
AHEAD 30 mm internal structure

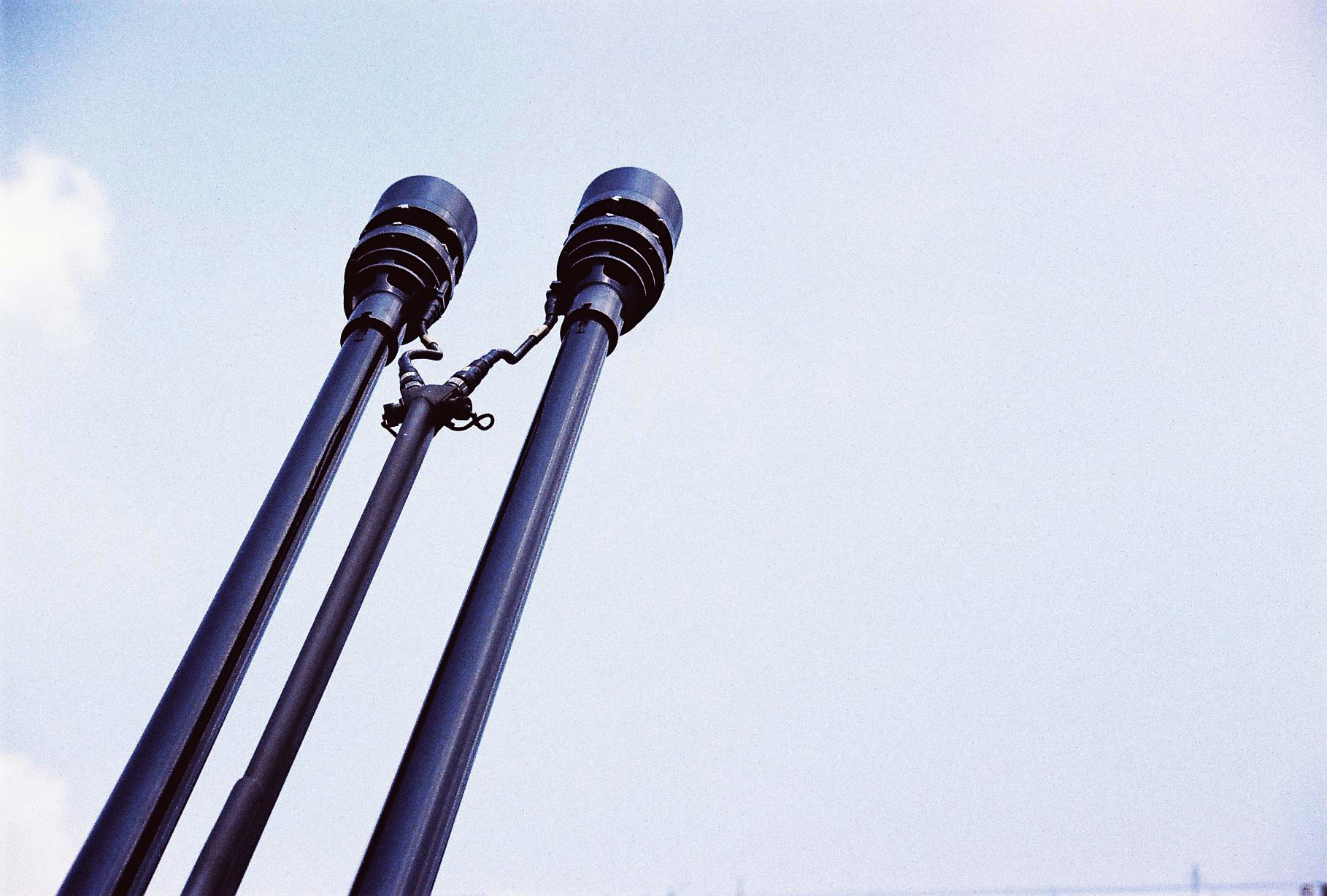
Device at the end of the barrel that programs the burst of the ammunition

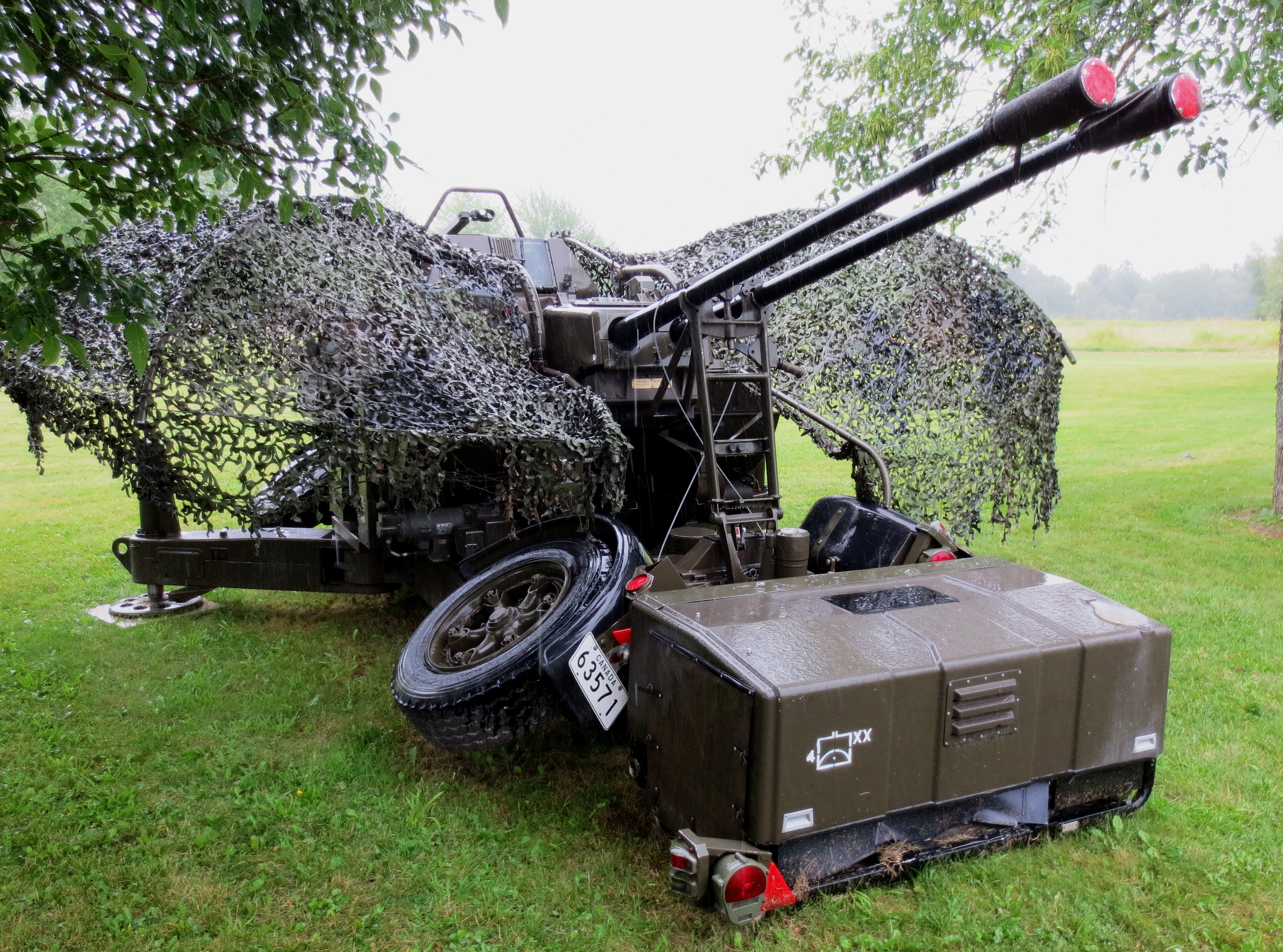
Equipped for the use of the AHEAD 35 mm
