= Sea Slice =

Experimental SWATH vessel

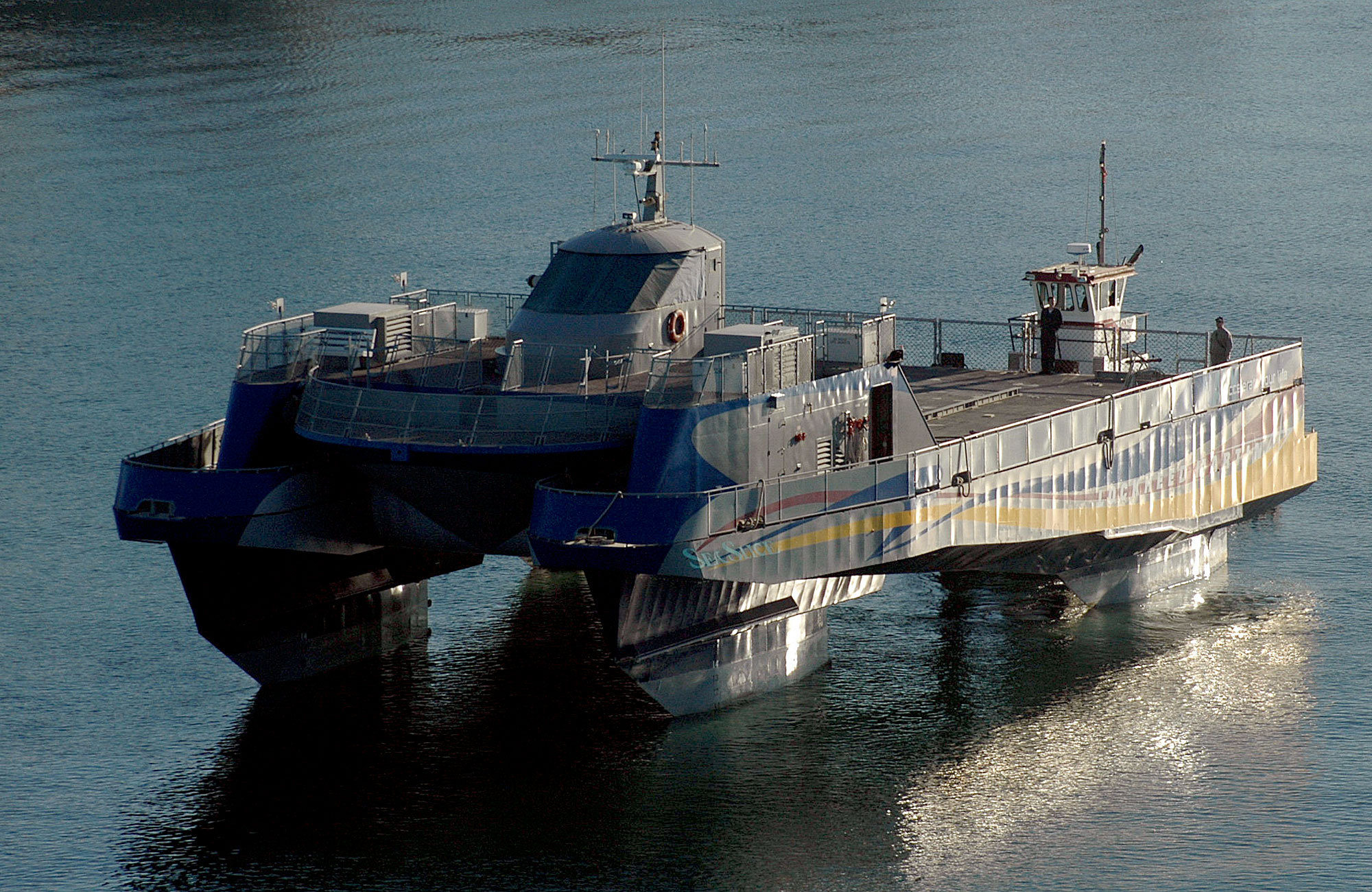
- USN experimental Small water area vessel.

History

United States
- Builder: Lockheed Martin; Nichols Brothers Shipyards; Pacific Marine & Supply Company, Ltd.
- Cost: US$15 million
- Identification: IMO number: 9113252
- Fate: Scrapped 2019

General characteristics
- Tonnage: 180 tons
- Length: 104 ft (32 m)
- Beam: 55 ft (17 m)
- Speed: 30 knots (56 km/h; 35 mph)
- Armament: Oerlikon Millennium 35 mm Naval Revolver Gun System; NETFIRES; Loitering Attack Munition (canceled)

HSV Sea Slice was an experimental vessel, built by Lockheed Martin, for the United States Navy, later used in commercial service.

== History ==
Based on a variant of the SWATH hull design, known as "SLICE," Sea Slice is characterized by four teardrop-shaped submerged hulls—double the number seen on most previous designs. The design reduces waves and drag, which allows a SWATH vessel to "...operate at higher speeds while retaining their characteristic low motions in a seaway". Designed for operation in the same area as, and to mount similar armament to, a littoral combat ship-type corvette, the planned weapon options included the Millennium Gun and the NetFires System, intended to launch Lockheed's (now cancelled) Loitering Attack Munition.

Sea Slice was withdrawn from Navy service and made available for purchase for civilian use, and purchased by Danish company, Advanced Offshore Solutions ApS, for conversion to a wind farm support vessel.

In May 2019 the vessel was scrapped in Esbjerg, Denmark after a failed attempt to repair the engine.

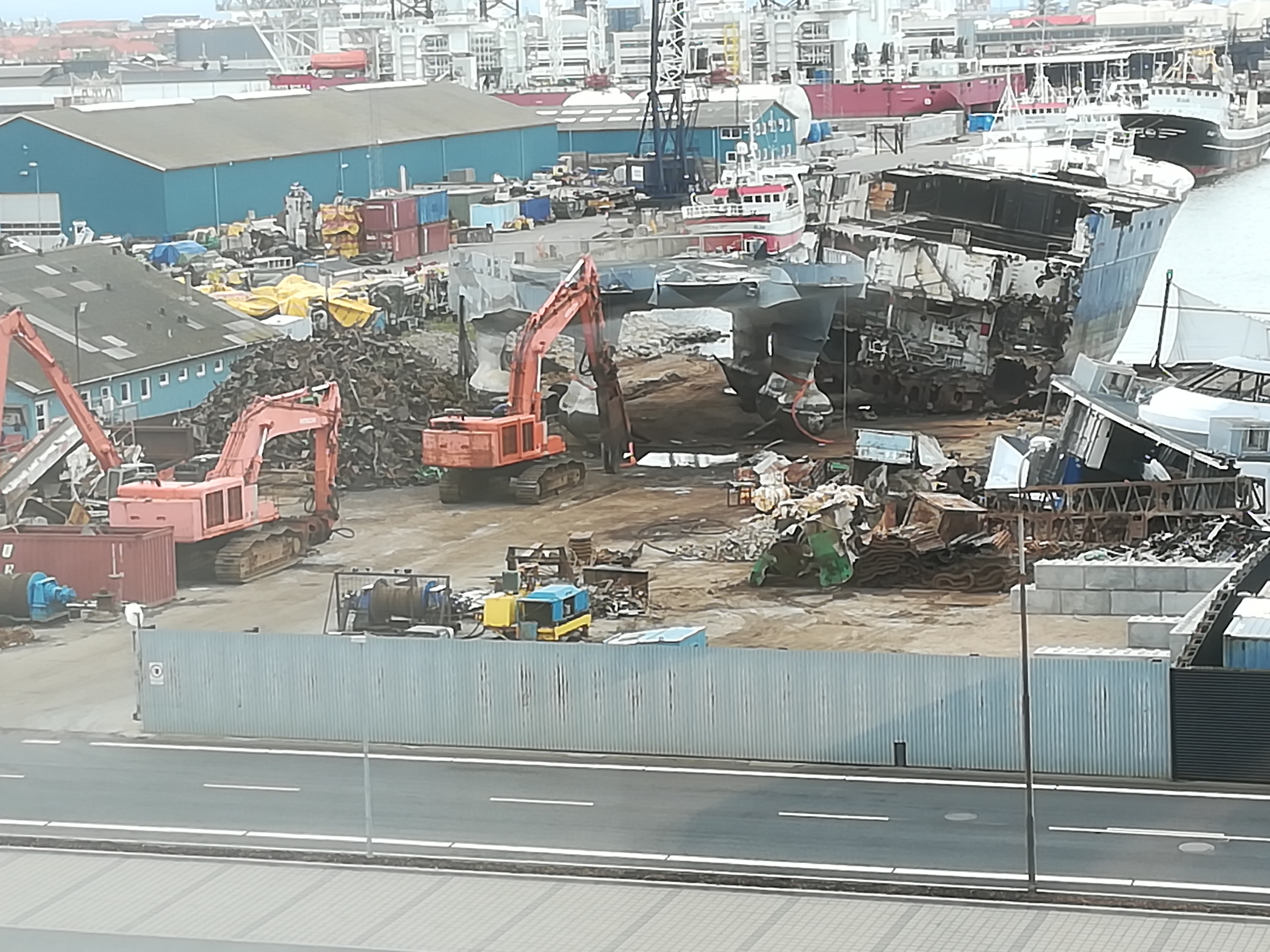
Sea Slice being scrapped in Esbjerg, Denmark

== See also ==
- Sea Shadow (IX-529)
- Sea Fighter (FSF-1)
