= Skyshield =

Short range air defense system

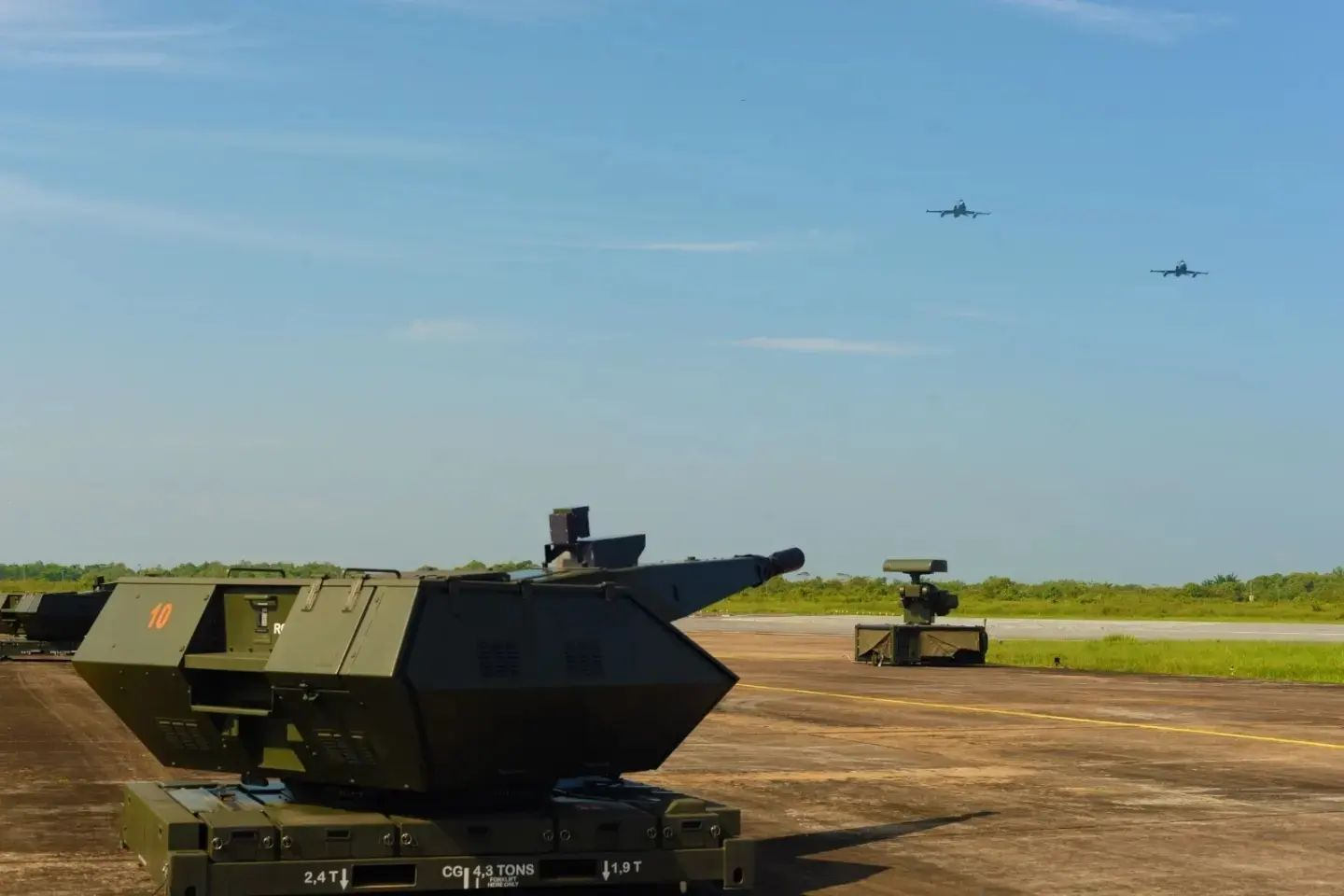
A pair of Indonesian Air Force BAE Hawk 209 flying over a Skyshield revolver gun Mark 2, with a Fire Control Unit in the background, at Supadio AFB

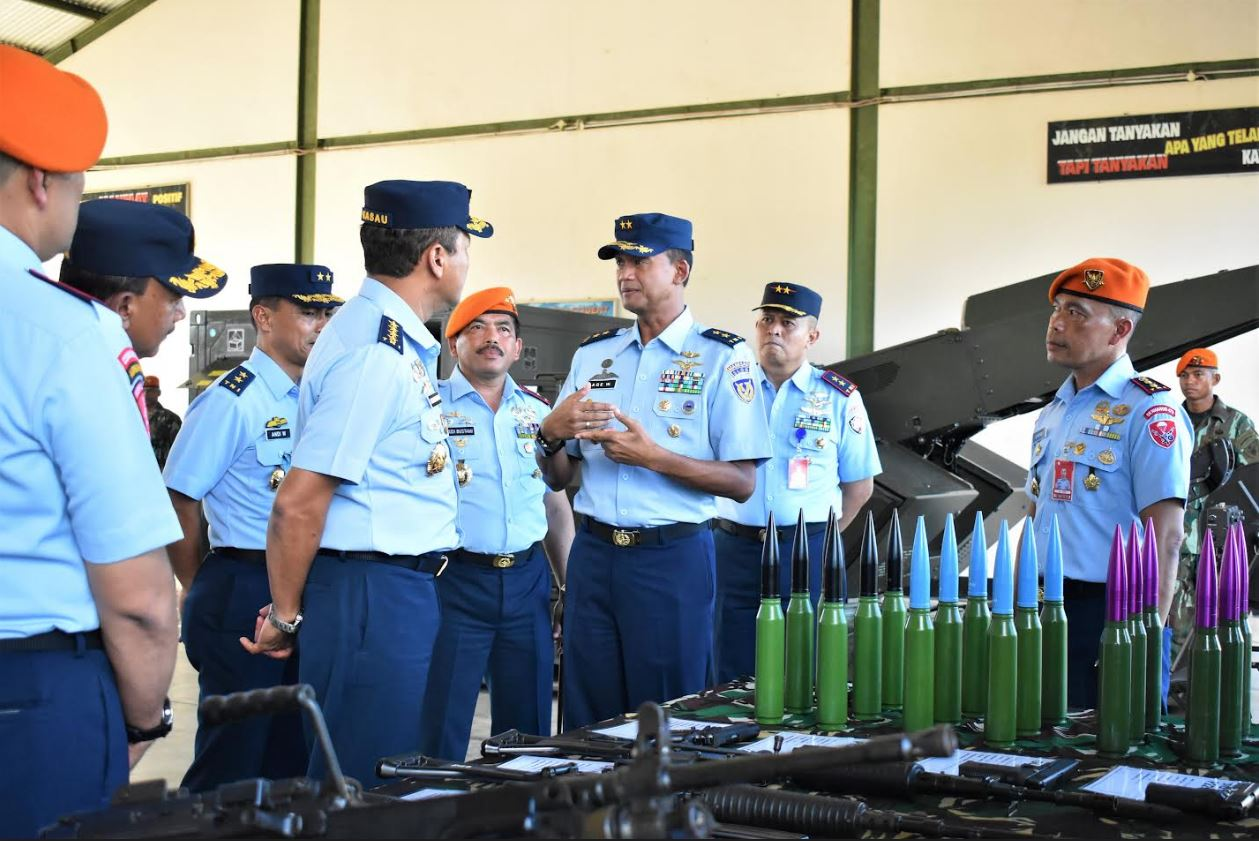
Ammunition used by the Skyshield: AHEAD, Training, and Dummy rounds

Skyshield is a modular, light weight, short range air defense (SHORAD) system developed by the Swiss corporation Oerlikon Contraves, now a subsidiary of Rheinmetall of Germany. The successor to the Skyguard official system, Skyshield is intended to rapidly acquire and destroy threatening aircraft and missiles, and to fulfill a C-RAM role.

== Design ==
One firing unit consists of two 35 mm (1.38 inch) revolver cannons with a rate of fire of 1,000 rounds per minute, a fire control system made up of a sensor unit and a detached command post. The Skyshield can use up to two surface-to-air missile 8-cell modules for an expanded air defense capability. The Skyshield is designed for traditional anti-aircraft roles, in addition to defense against missiles (see anti-ballistic missile).

The Skyshield is deployed by trucks and other transportation systems. It can also be transported by medium lift aircraft such as the C-130.

The fire control system (FCS) uses an X-band search and tracking radar X-TAR-3D, and another unit for radar/TV and/or laser/FLIR precision tracking. The command post can be placed up to 500 meters, roughly, from the fire control unit (FCU), using encrypted radio-waves. The Skyshield system can be networked with other air defense systems for wider and more effective air coverage, expanding its roles from point defense to area defense.

Radars for the acquisition and tracking of air and surface targets, named Oerlikon Tracking Module TMX Mk2 and TMKu Mk2, operated in X and Ku band respectively.

== Variants ==
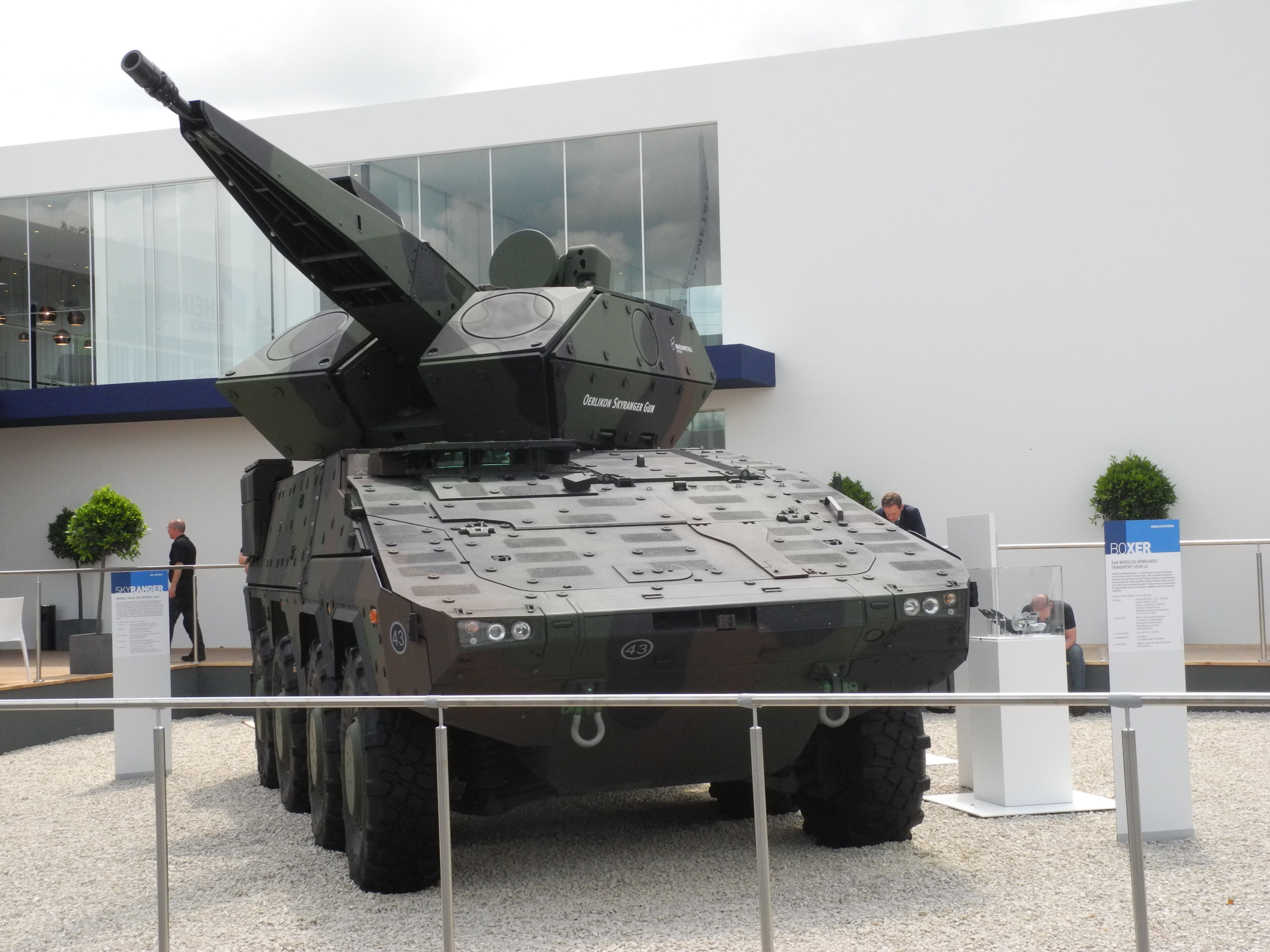
At Eurosatory 2018, Rheinmetall displayed a Boxer fitted with the Oerlikon Skyranger 35 air defence system.

A modified and improved version of Skyshield with six fully automated turrets, dubbed MANTIS (Modular, Automatic and Network capable Targeting and Interception System) was ordered by the German Army as a stationary base defence system. Two systems were delivered in 2011, with more orders being planned as a part of German Army's future "SysFla" air defence program.

A mobile version called Oerlikon Skyranger 35 has been demonstrated, with the turret fitted to a Boxer armoured fighting vehicle.

== Operators ==
The complete Skyshield air-defence array with a SAM module in the back right

Indonesia (7)
The Indonesian Air Force operates seven firing units of the Skyshield as of 2025. Orders began with 4 firing units in 2014, with a follow up order for 11 more units in 2017, which was only effective by November 2018 due to funding issues.
South Africa (4)
In March 2014, Rheinmetall signed a contract with the South African Army to modernize the country's existing SHORAD systems. The contract encompassed the supply of Oerlikon Skyshield fire control units to substantially improve the performance and accuracy of South Africa's existing twin-gun systems, as well as significantly expand the operational spectrum of its air defence capabilities. South Africa currently operates 102 GDF-002 and 48 modified GDF-005 units. In this context, a number of the twin-gun systems will also be retrofitted with upgrade kits to accommodate Rheinmetall's state-of-the-art AHEAD anti-missile programmable ammunition including logistics and training services. The complete package was scheduled for completion by 2017.

== See also ==
- List of artillery
- Anti-aircraft guns
- MANTIS - the very short-range protection system of the German Army within the "SysFla" program.
- Phalanx CIWS - A land-based stand alone model of the Phalanx Weapon System called the Centurion CRAM were deployed to the Middle East by the United States in 2008.
