= MANTIS Air Defence System =

Air defence system

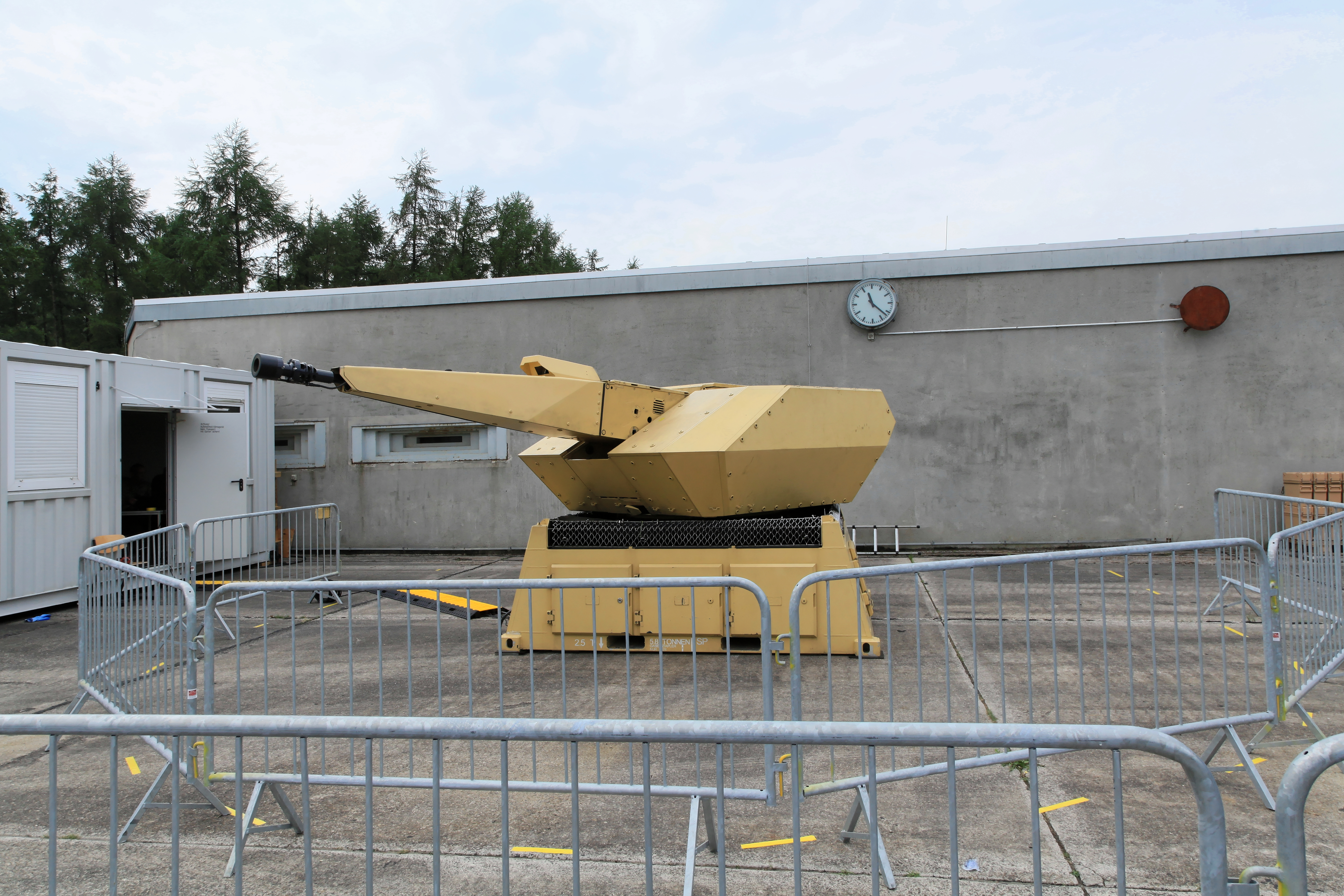
- A MANTIS turret of the in service with the German Air Force

Service history
- Used by: Slovakia

Production history
- Manufacturer: Rheinmetall Air Defence
- Produced: 2011–present

Specifications
- Mass: 5800 kg with ammunition
- Crew: 4
- Shell: AHEAD 35×228mm
- Caliber: 35 × 228 mm
- Elevation: −15° to +85°
- Traverse: Full 360°
- Rate of fire: 1000 rounds/min

MANTIS Air Defence System (Modular Automatic and Network-capable Targeting and Interception System), formerly titled NBS-C-RAM (Nächstbereichschutzsystem C-RAM), is a very short range air defence protection system, intended for base-protection. It is produced by Rheinmetall Air Defence, a subsidiary of Rheinmetall of Germany. It was a part of the German Air Force's future SysFla air-defence project.

== System ==
The MANTIS system is intended to detect, track and shoot down incoming projectiles before they can reach their target within very close range. The system is based on Oerlikon Contraves' Skyshield air defence gun system. A MANTIS system consists of six 35 mm automatic guns (capable of firing 1,000 rounds per minute), a ground control unit and two sensor units. The guns fire programmable AHEAD ammunition, developed by Rheinmetall Weapons and Munitions - Switzerland (formerly Oerlikon Contraves Pyrotec). The ammunition carries a payload of 152 tungsten projectiles weighing 3.3 g (51 gr) each.

The MANTIS radar can acquire a target within two seconds, then engage it with one of the guns firing a 36-round burst. Two guns directed by one radar each can engage multiple targets. After being manually activated, the system operates fully automatically.

Originally, the German Army ordered a first batch of two systems in 2009, to be delivered in 2013, with two more systems planned to follow later but these were never bought. Both MANTIS systems were transferred to the Luftwaffe, which is responsible for all air defence tasks. The Luftwaffe took possession of the first MANTIS system on January 1, 2011. It was first deployed to Mali at the end of 2017, although without the guns. The first two systems cost around €110.8 million, plus another €20 million for training and documentation purposes. In a follow-on contract, worth around €13.4 million, Rheinmetall also delivered the corresponding ammunition to the Bundeswehr.

On 7 February 2023, Germany announced it would be donating the two MANTIS systems to Slovakia to strengthen Slovak Air Defence permanently.

On 24 October 2023, The Armed Forces of the Slovak Republic (Ozbrojené sily Slovenskej republiky) took over the MANTIS air defence system from the Luftwaffe, specifically the 11th Air Force Brigade in Nitra. Their task will be to strengthen the protection of the eastern border with Ukraine.

== Operators ==
=== Current operators ===
- Slovakia: 2 systems were received from Germany in 2023.

=== Former operators ===
- Germany: 2 systems donated to Slovakia in 2023.

== See also ==
- CIWS
- LFK NG—the new air-defence missile of the German Army within the "SysFla" project
- Phalanx CIWS—In 2004 the United States began to develop a land-based standalone model of its Phalanx Weapon System called the Centurion CRAM which was deployed to the Middle East in 2008
- Rheinmetall Oerlikon Millennium Gun—Naval CIWS by Rheinmetall using same gun
