= Rheinmetall Air Defence =

German military arms company

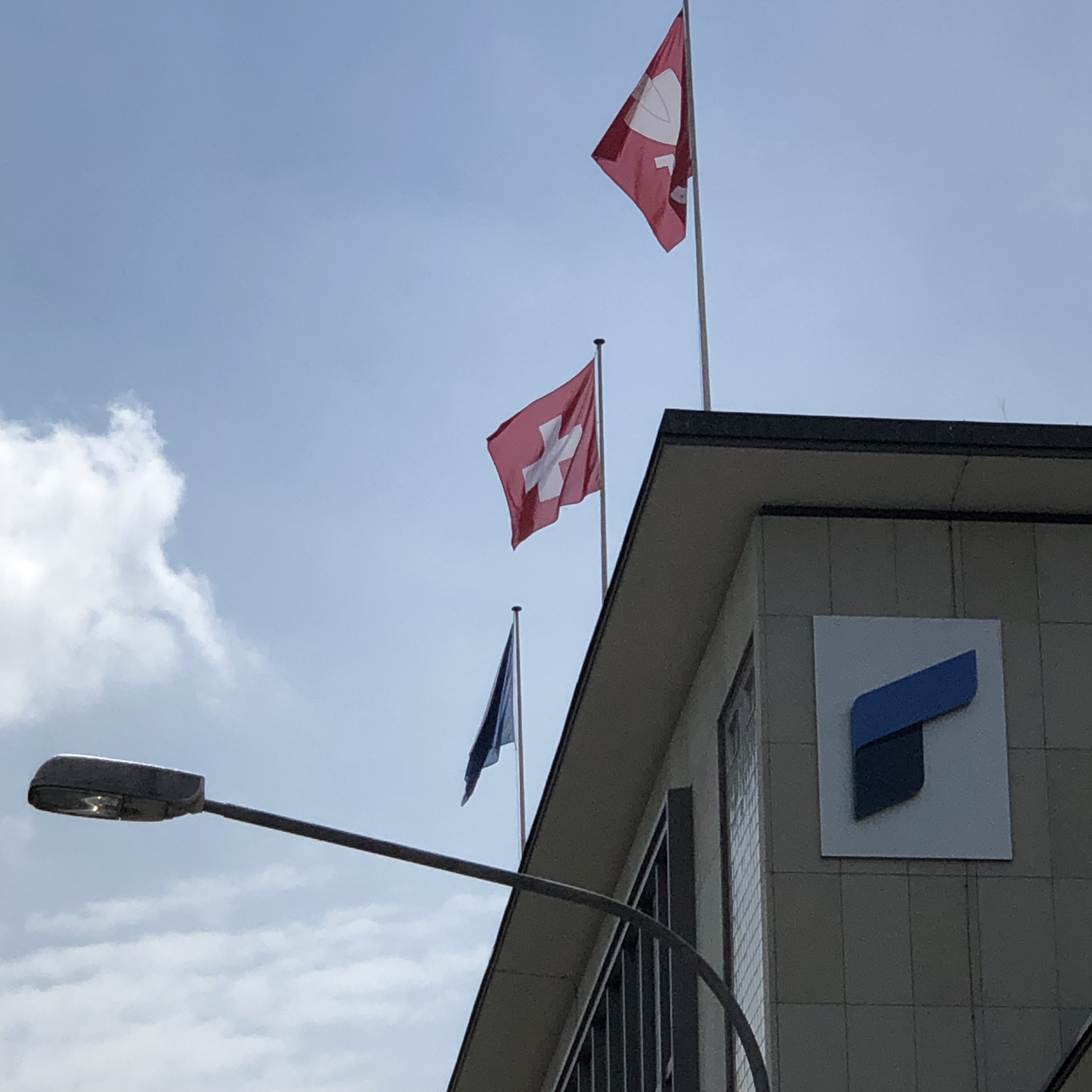
Rheinmetall Air Defence office at the arms factory in Zürich-Oerlikon

Rheinmetall Air Defence AG, a division of German armament-manufacturer Rheinmetall, formed when the company's Oerlikon Contraves unit was renamed on 1 January 2009 and integrated with Rheinmetall's other air-defence products. (Oerlikon Contraves, a Swiss manufacturer of anti-aircraft artillery, became famous for its adaptation of the 1916 20 mm Becker as the Oerlikon 20 mm autocannon design, which was used in the Second World War and remains in use. Copies and derivatives of these designs were made by German, French, British, and Japanese weapon manufacturers.) Rheinmetall purchased Oerlikon Contraves in 1999.

As of January 2009, Rheinmetall Air Defence had around 1,050 employees at locations in Switzerland, Germany, Italy, and Canada. The group's sales in 2008 comprised about 380,000,000 Euros.

== History ==
Oerlikon's earliest predecessor was Schweizerische Werkzeugmaschinenfabrik Oerlikon, founded in the Oerlikon district of Zürich, Switzerland in 1906.

In 1923 it acquired a factory in Germany. It entered the anti-aircraft defence field in 1924. In 1936, it founded a purely anti-aircraft development company called Contraves (contra aves is Latin for "against birds", better translated as "anti-flying-objects") In 1989, the Werkzeugmaschinenfabrik Oerlikon-Bührle and Contraves merged to form the Oerlikon-Contraves Group, later renamed Oerlikon Contraves Defence. Oerlikon Contraves was purchased by Rheinmetall, a German armament manufacturer, in 1999, and renamed Rheinmetall Air Defence AG on 1 January 2009.

=== Historic products ===
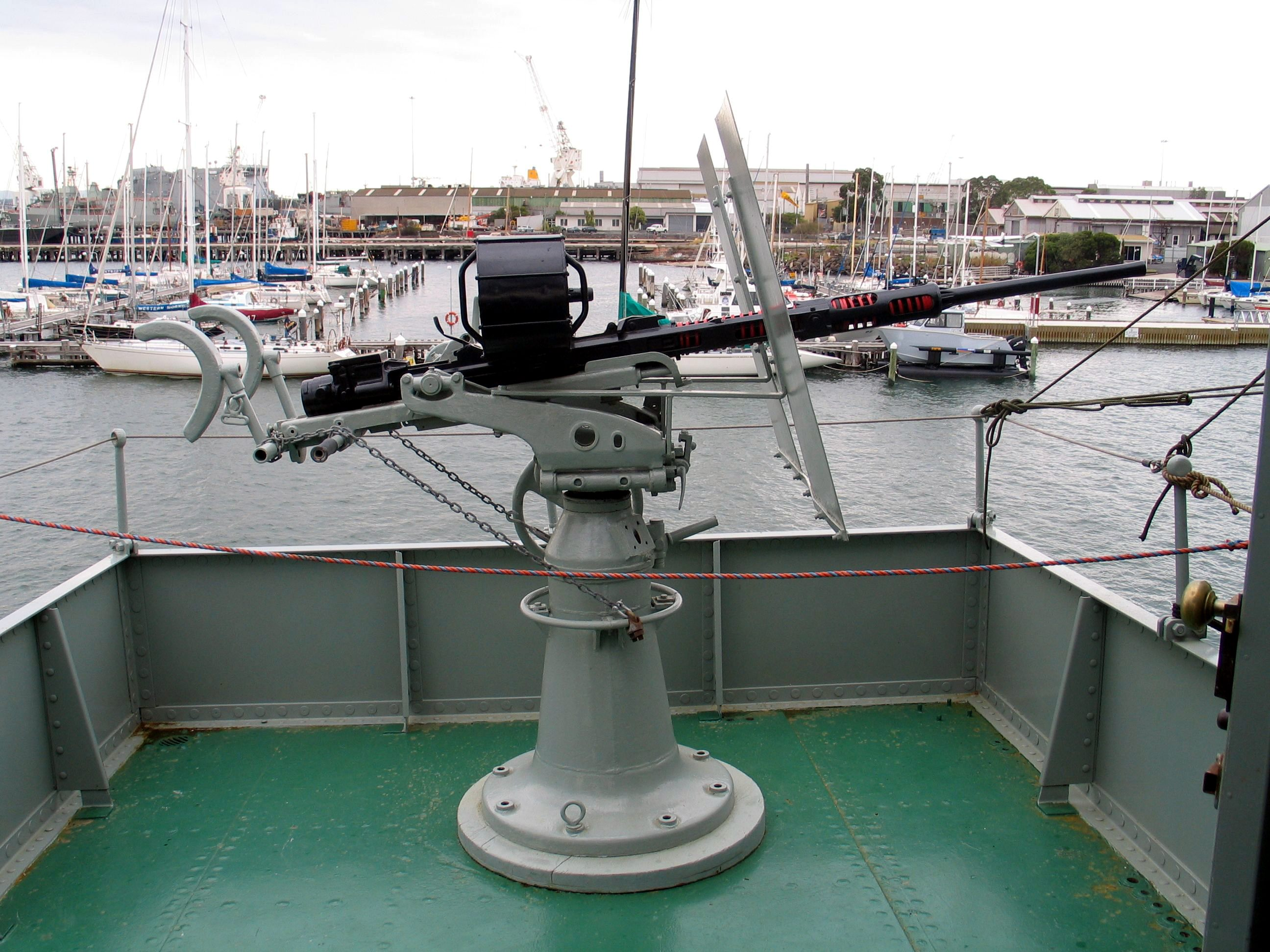
Oerlikon 20 mm cannon

American versions of the Oerlikon 20 mm cannon, such as the Mk 4, Mk 10, and Mk 24, were used extensively from World War II to the Vietnam War. As anti-aircraft weapons used by the US Navy, they were frequently the last line of defence against kamikaze attacks. Most combat ships from aircraft carriers to PT boats were equipped with Oerlikon guns. During the Vietnam War they were widely employed by riverine forces as anti-personnel weapons. They remained in service until the 1970s, when they were replaced by the Mk 16 20 mm cannon.

Oerlikon also developed the following surface-to-air missiles: the RSA Missile, the RSD 58, and the Kriens RSC Missile. Oerlikons 20mm cannon was frequently used on Naval Ships throughout the 1920s, 30s and 40s.

== Products ==
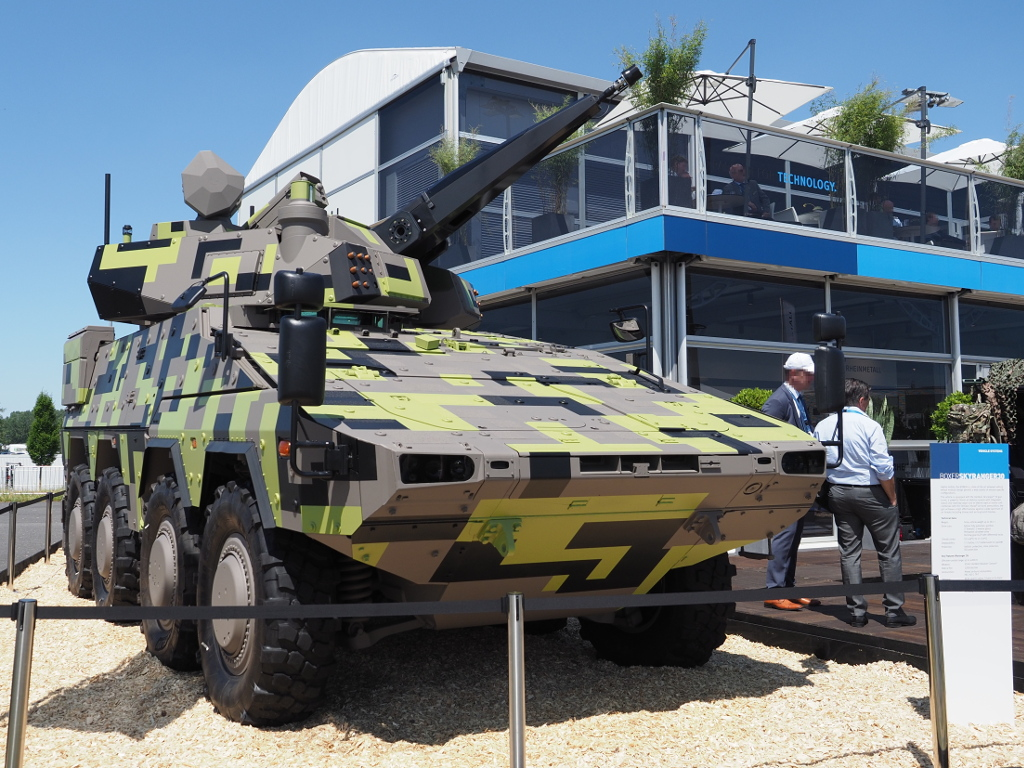
The Skyranger 30 is the Rheinmetall's latest mobile air defence system

Rheinmetall Air Defence specialises in ground-based and naval air defence. Their products include search-and-tracking sensors, 35 mm air-defence guns, command-and-control posts, battle management and ship-based combat systems.

=== Medium calliber weapons ===
- Oerlikon KAA cannon and KAB, calibre 20×128 mm
- Oerlikon KAD cannon, calibre 20×139 mm, originally developed by Hispano-Suiza
- Oerlikon KAE cannon, calibre 20×128 mm (modernised variant of KAA and KAB)
- Oerlikon KBA autocanon, calibre 25×137 mm Used with: Oerlikon Searanger 25, Oerlikon Fieldranger 25, Dardo IFV, Freccia IFV, Hitfist turret, Leonardo Spallacia, Valhalla MANGART 25, ASELSAN STOP, ASELSAN NEFER,
- Oerlikon KCE autocanon, calibre 30×173 mm
- Oerlikon KDE autocanon, calibre 35×228 mm (used on Mitsubishi Type 89 IFV)

=== Ground-based air defence ===
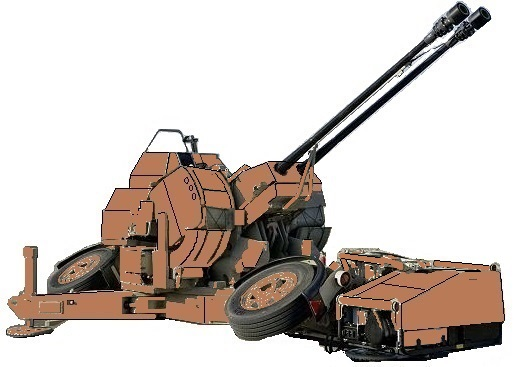
Oerlikon 35 mm twin cannon

- Radar systems
  - Oerlikon Skyguard 3
  - X-TAR3D (radar)
- Ground Based Air Defence Unit:
  - Oerlikon GDF, calibre 35×228 mm, twin cannon
  - Oerlikon MANTIS C-RAM, calibre 35×228 mm
  - Oerlikon Skyshield, calibre 35×228 mm
    - Oerlikon revolver gun Mk2
    - Oerlikon revolver gun Mk3
  - Oerlikon Skynex
    - SkyKnight C-RAM missile launcher unit
- Mobile Air Defence:
  - Oerlikon Skyranger:
    - Oerlikon Skyranger 30
    - Oerlikon Skyranger 35
    - Oerlikon Skyranger Search Radar Control Node (SRCN)
    - Oerlikon Skyranger Missile (Stinger oder äquivalent)
    - Oerlikon Skyranger Missile (Cheetah)
  - Air Defence Anti-Tank System
  - Natter Counter-UAS-System
  - High-energy laser C-RAM
- Command systems
  - Oerlikon Skymaster
  - Oerlikon Skynex

=== Naval systems ===
- Naval Gun Systems:
  - Oerlikon Natter:
    - Oerlikon Natter 7.62, calibre 7.62×51 mm NATO
    - Oerlikon Natter 12.7, calibre 12.7×99 mm NATO
  - Oerlikon Searanger:
    - Oerlikon Searanger 20, calibre 20×128 mm
    - Oerlikon Searanger 25, calibre 25×137 mm
  - Oerlikon Seasnake:
    - Oerlikon Seasnake 20, calibre 20×128 mm
    - Oerlikon Seasnake 30, calibre 30×173 mm
  - Oerlikon Millennium Naval Gun, calibre 35×228 mm
- Search and Acquisition Radar:
  - Oerlikon X-TAR3D/M
- Radar and Electro Optical Tracking Modules:
  - Oerlikon TMX/EO NT
  - Oerlikon TMX/EO Mk2
  - Oerlikon SeaVision
  - Oerlikon SeaStorm
  - Oerlikon Sea Zenith
- Command and Control:
  - Oerlikon Seaguard naval tracking system
  - Oerlikon Weapon Control Module

=== Weapon stations (vehicles) ===
- Oerlikon Fieldranger 20
- Oerlikon Fieldranger 25

=== Other military products ===
- Mosquito (missile) ATGM
- LLM01 laser light module for firearms

=== Civilian products ===
Oerlikon Contraves subsidiary Oerlikon Transtec manufactured railcar and locomotive systems, including locomotive brakes, subway and electric train power conversion systems, and other subsidiary systems for mass-transit vehicles. As of October 2010, Rheinmetall's website no longer lists these products as part of the Air Defence group.

== Corruption charges ==
Rheinmetall Air Defence (RAD) is one of six companies that were blacklisted by India's Ministry of Defence in March 2012 for their involvement in a bribery scandal. The companies are accused of bribing the Director General of Ordnance Factories Board (OFB), Sudipta Ghosh. RAD and the other firms have been barred from any dealings with the OFB and all other Indian defence companies, as well as being blacklisted from participating in any Indian defence contract, for a period of 10 years. RAD has claimed that the charges against it are without merit.

Rheinmetall Air Defence was implicated in a corruption case in India along with arms dealer Abhishek Verma and his wife Anca Verma lodged by anti-corruption agency of India, the CBI in 2012 for bribing defence officials for securing multi billion dollar weapons contracts of the Indian military establishment. RAD Chairman Bodo Garbe and General Manager Gerhard Hoy were issued summons of the Indian courts. Subsequently a red-corner notice was issued for their detention through Interpol. The case at present is under trial in Indian courts.

== See also ==
- 30mm DS30M Mark 2 Automated Small Calibre Gun
- Typhoon Weapon Station
