= Short range air defense =

Anti-air weapons against low-flying targets

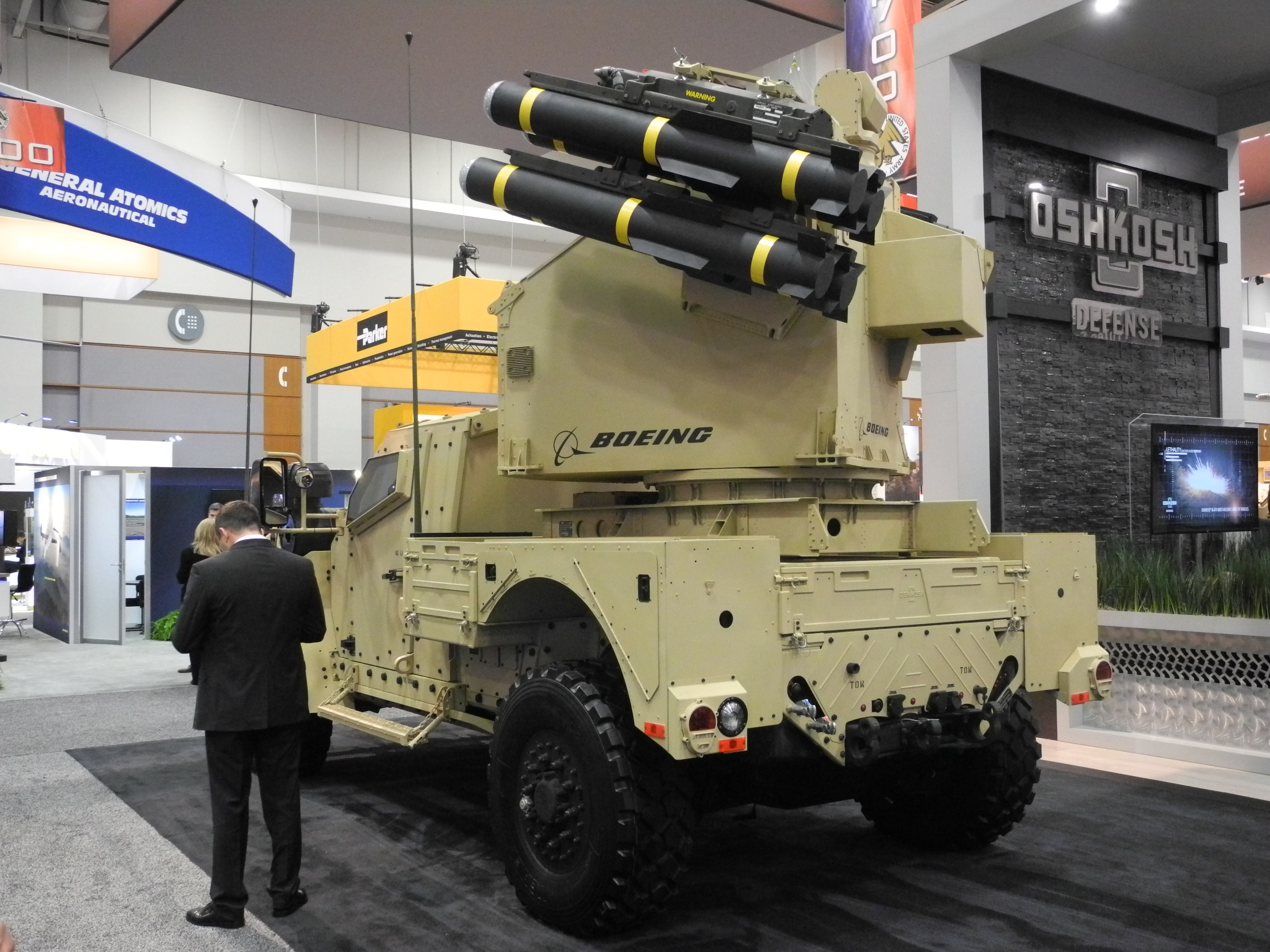
At AUSA 2017, a JLTV Utility variant mounting Boeing's SHORAD Launcher

Short-range air defense (SHORAD) is a group of anti-aircraft weapons and tactics that have to do with defense against low-altitude air threats, primarily helicopters, low-flying aircraft such as the A-10 or Sukhoi Su-25, and low-flying UCAV and loitering munitions. SHORAD and its complements, HIMAD (High to Medium Air Defense) and THAAD (Terminal High Altitude Area Defense), divide air defense of the battlespace into domes of responsibility based on altitude and defensive weapon ranges.

== Canada ==
The Canadian Forces Land Force Command used the Air Defense Anti-Tank System (ADATS) based on the M113A2 prior to its retirement from service in 2012. ADATS is a completely self-contained system in an unmanned turret with FLIR (Forward-Looking Infrared) and TV sensors, laser rangefinder and designator, a search radar. Composed of eight missiles, the ADATS can find and hit multiple threats in few seconds. After the withdrawal of the ADATS, Rheinmetall Canada made the AMADS (Advanced Man-portable Air Defense System) which comprises a command post Battle Management Software (BMS) and MANPADS cueing system. AMADS however, was not procured by the Canadian Armed Forces.

== China ==
The PLA Ground Force operates a layered short-range air defense architecture, providing both mobile protection for mechanized units and point defense for critical sites.

Radar-guided missile systems such as the HQ-7 and HQ-17 provide mobile, short-range air defense for mechanized units, engaging aircraft, helicopters, and cruise missiles before they reach the formation. The Type 92 Yitian (Tianlong-6) mounts short-range missiles and sensors on a wheeled armored vehicle, offering highly mobile, rapid-response coverage against low-altitude threats and capable of operating independently or as part of a networked battery. Self-propelled gun-missile systems such as the Type 95 (PGZ-95) and Type 09 (PGZ-09) deliver concentrated close-range firepower.

Point-defense systems like the HQ-6/HQ-64 are primarily used to protect fixed or critical sites.

== Denmark ==
Denmark has like Germany, also ordered the Skyranger 30 mounted on Mowag Piranha Vs on 16 May 2023.

== Germany ==
Rheinmetall Air Defence has developed two types of SHORAD systems called Skyranger 30 and Skyranger 35.

== India ==
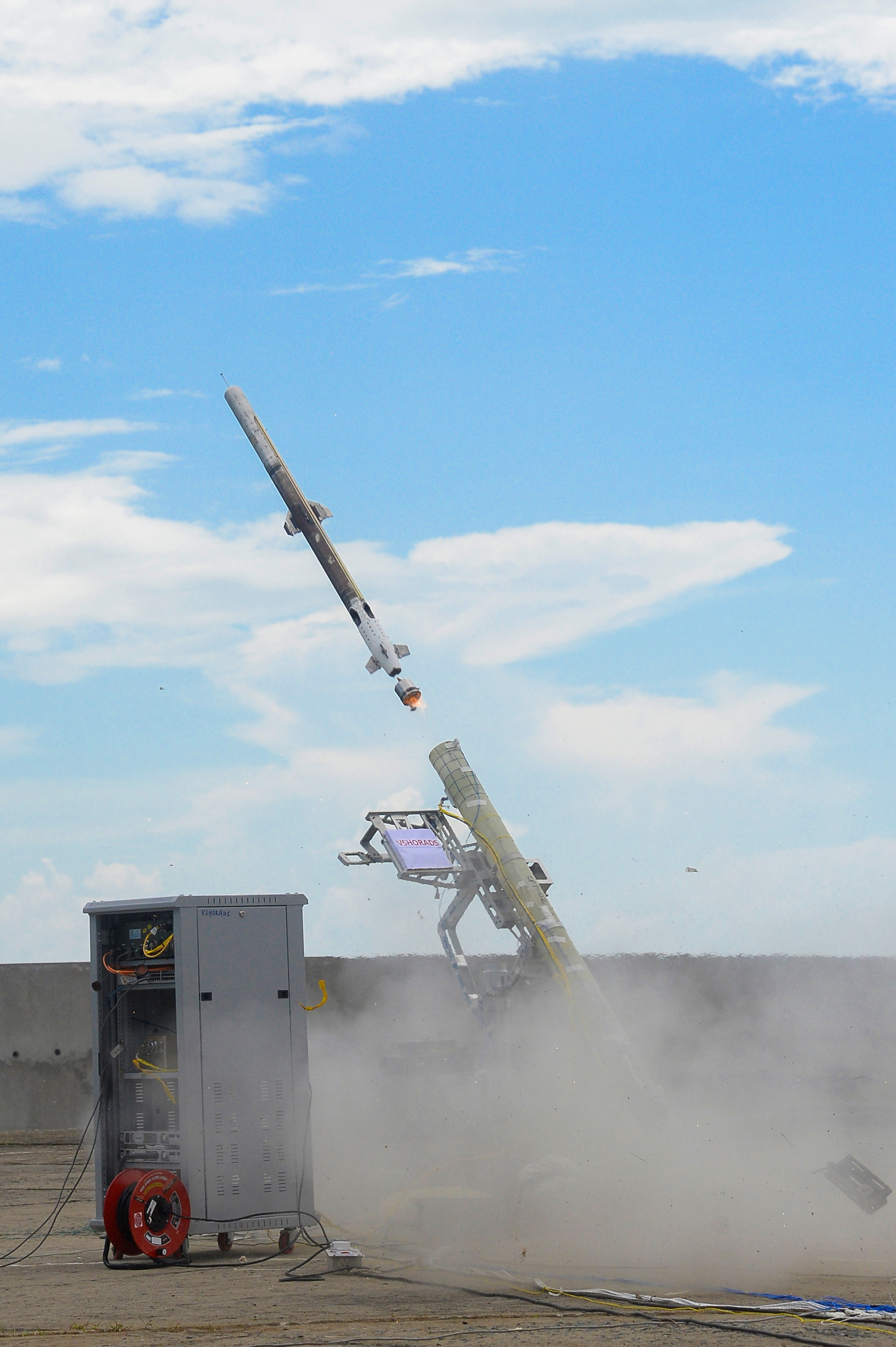
India's maiden test of VSHORADS launcher and missile

India has started testing of an indigenous VSHORAD system. Multiple tests were conducted successfully. The missile uses dual thrust motors and is meant to take out low flying targets.

== Norway ==
The Norwegian Army ordered "Mobile Ground Based Air Defence System" based on NASAMS 3, which includes air-mobile Humvee launchers capable of firing AIM-9X Sidewinder missiles and tracked launchers for IRIS-T SLS missiles.

== Pakistan ==
Pakistan's Global Industrial Defence Solutions (GIDS) has developed the Faaz-SL missile with a range of 25 km, launched from a ground vehicle.

== Russia ==
- ZSU-23-4M4
- Tunguska gun/missile system
- Pantsir gun/missile system
- 2S38 Derivatsiya-PVO
- Strela-10 missile system
- Sosna-R missile system
- Tor missile system
  - 42S6 Morfey

== South Korea ==
- K30 Biho
- K30W Cheonho
- KP-SAM Chiron

== Sweden ==
The Swedish Army ordered LVRBS 98 systems based on a BvS10 All Terrain Armoured Vehicle equipped with four IRIS-T SLS missiles.

== Turkey ==
Aselsan developed various SHORAD systems such as ATILGAN PMSS, HİSAR and Sungur.

== United States ==
In the United States Army, Avenger air defense artillery battalions will be assigned to a theater or corps, and may attach air defense platoons to a brigade combat team or maneuver battalion. SHORAD units are based upon a mounted platform, the AN/TWQ-1 Avenger, which utilizes eight FIM-92 Stinger missiles coupled with a FLIR, laser range finder, and a M3P 12.7 mm (.50) caliber machine gun for close-in defense.

The Army also ordered Stryker SHORAD platform, equipped with four Stinger and two AGM-114L Longbow Hellfire missiles, 30 mm M230 chain gun, 7.62 M240 machine gun, and a 360-degree search radar system. First vehicles were delivered in 2021, and a total of 144 vehicles will be deployed by 2025.

In the United States Marine Corps, there are only two existing Low Altitude Air Defense (LAAD) Battalions : 2d Low Altitude Air Defense Battalion and 3d Low Altitude Air Defense Battalion.

The following Military Occupational Specialties (MOS's) are related to SHORAD:

- 14G: Air Defense Battle Management System Operator (formerly 14J)
- 14P: Avenger Crew Member / MANPADS Fire Unit
- 7212: Low Altitude Air Defense Gunner (USMC)

== See also ==
- Self-propelled anti-aircraft weapon
- Starstreak
