= Skyknight (missile) =

SkyKnight
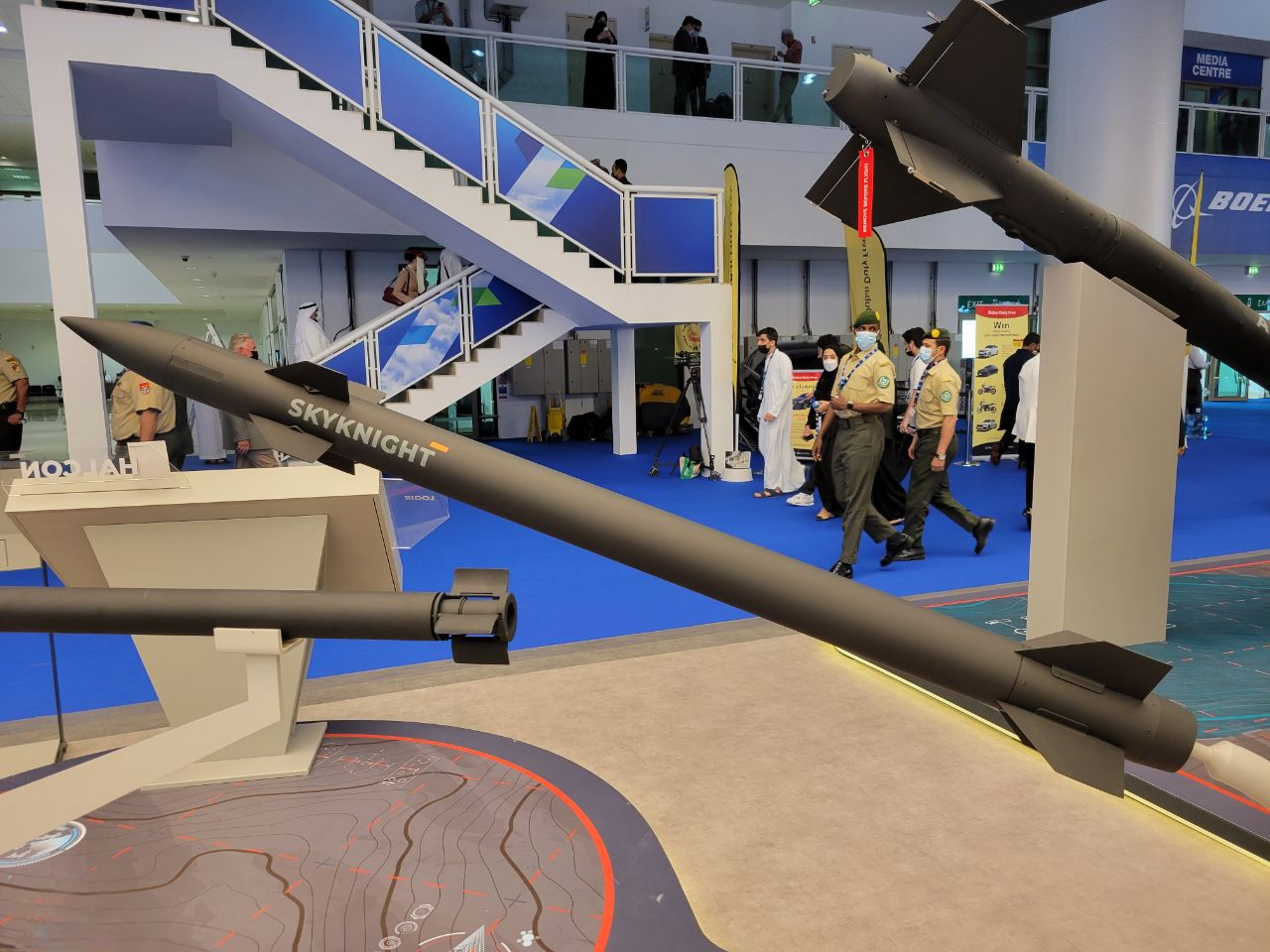
- Type: Surface-to-air missile Counter rocket, artillery, and mortar
- Place of origin: United Arab Emirates

Service history
- In service: 2026

Production history
- Designer: Halcon Systems
- Designed: August 2020
- Manufacturer: Halcon Systems

Specifications
- Mass: 35 kg (77 lb)
- Length: 2.2 m (7.2 ft)
- Diameter: 115 mm (4.5 in)
- Wingspan: 300 mm (12 in)
- Operational range: 10 km (6.2 mi; 5.4 nmi)
- Guidance system: Radar

The SkyKnight is an Emirati all-weather multi-target short-range air defence missile. It was developed by Halcon Systems and is the United Arab Emirates' first designed counter-rocket, artillery, and mortar (C-RAM) missile. SkyKnight is planned to be integrated into Rheinmetall Skynex air defence system.

Skynex is a fully networked system of sensors and effectors linked via a tactical communications network to provide a mostly automated layered defence against various aerial threats. Up to four 6.1 m (20 ft)-long SkyKnight missile launcher units (MLU) with 60 rounds each can be controlled in a Skynex battery. An MLU can launch up to five missiles in one second and each can simultaneously fire 20 at one time to neutralize 80 incoming targets. The missiles are capable of intercepting manned and unmanned aircraft and helicopters at 10 km (6.2 mi), precision guided munitions (PGMs) and cruise missiles at 6 km (3.7 mi), and RAM projectiles at 4 km (2.5 mi). The Skynex system combines the SkyKnight with up to four Oerlikon Revolver Gun Mk3 35 mm revolver cannons to handle anything that penetrates through the missile defenses.

Edge Group signed an agreement with Indonesian defense holding Republikorp in November 2025 for transfer of technology, local production, co-development initiatives and a modernization program for the Indonesian military. The deal also includes the Skyknight system.

== See also ==
- Iron Dome
- Skyshield
