= Rheinmetall Oerlikon Millennium Gun =

Type of defensive weapon system

Rheinmetall Millennium Gun
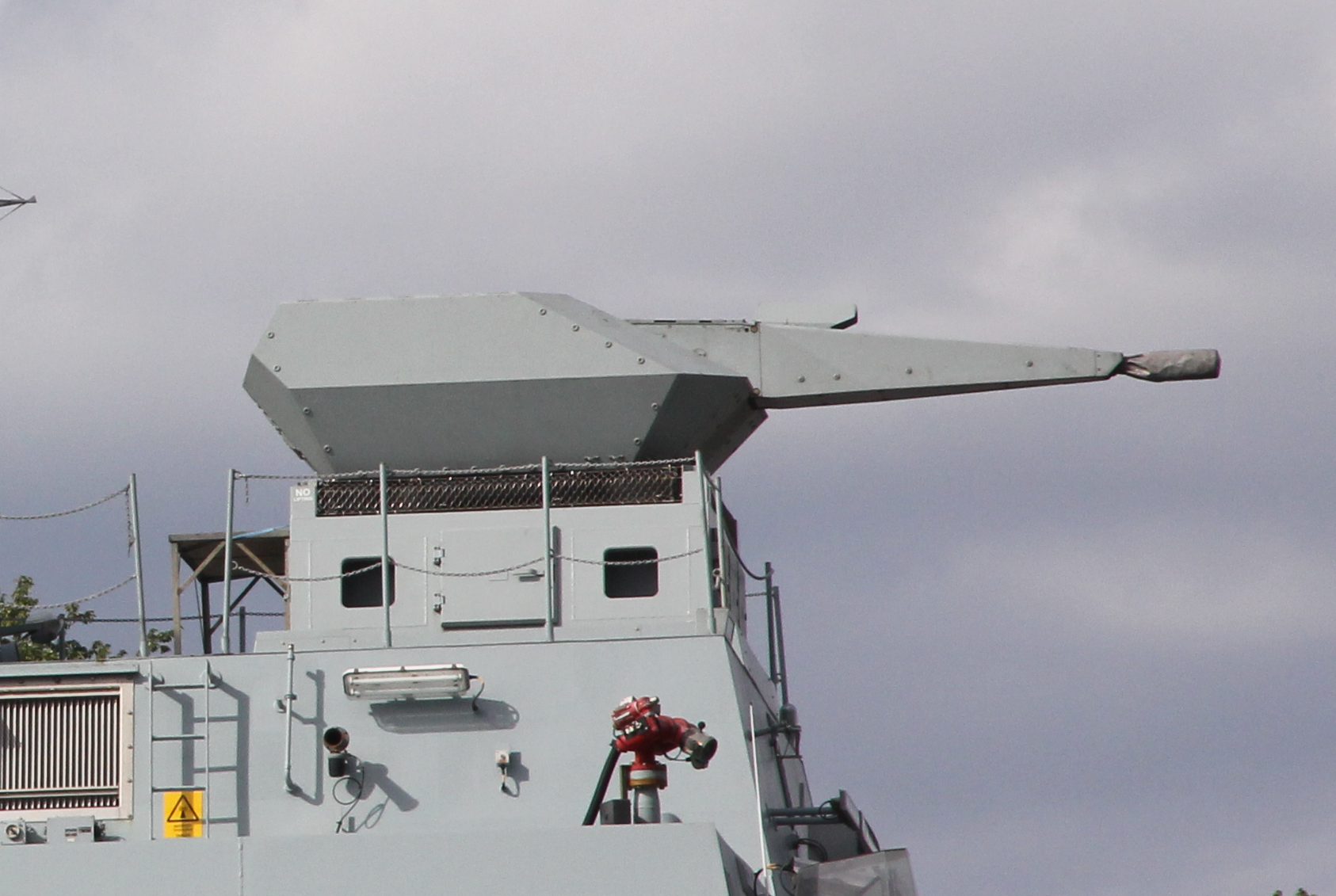
- Oerlikon Millennium 35mm Naval Revolver Gun System aboard the HDMS Peter Willemoes (F362)
- Type: CIWS
- Place of origin: Switzerland

Service history
- In service: 2003–present
- Used by: Danish Navy; Venezuelan Navy; Indonesian Navy

Production history
- Designed: 1995
- Manufacturer: Rheinmetall Air Defence, Oerlikon Contraves
- Developed into: Rheinmetall Oerlikon Skyranger 35

Specifications
- Mass: Gun: 450 kg Installation: 3300 kg
- Length: 5.5 m
- Width: 2.39 m
- Height: 1.94 m
- Crew: unmanned
- Shell: 35×228mm
- Caliber: 35 mm
- Barrels: Singular
- Action: Gas-operated four-chamber revolver cannon
- Elevation: -15 / +85 degrees rate: 70 degree/s
- Traverse: 360 degrees rate: 120 degrees per second
- Rate of fire: Single shot Rapid Single Shot: 200 rounds per minute Burst (automatic fire): 1000 rounds per minute
- Muzzle velocity: AHEAD: 1,050 m/s (3,400 ft/s); HEI: 1,175 m/s (3,850 ft/s); APDS/T: 1,440 m/s (4,700 ft/s)
- Effective firing range: 3,500–5,000 m (3,800–5,500 yd)
- Feed system: 252 linkless rounds in installation

The Rheinmetall Oerlikon Millennium Gun or Rheinmetall GDM-008 is a close-in weapon system designed by Rheinmetall Air Defence AG (formerly known as Oerlikon Contraves) for mounting on ships. It is based on the 35/1000 revolver gun land-based air defense system and uses Advanced Hit Efficiency And Destruction (AHEAD) ammunition.

== Description ==
A device at the muzzle end of the barrel measures the exact speed of each round as it is fired, and automatically sets the fuse to detonate the round as it approaches a pre-set distance from the target. Each round disperses 152 small tungsten projectiles weighing 3.3 grams (0.12 oz) each to form a lethal cone-shaped cloud to strike the incoming target. Whilst these are too small to do major damage in themselves, the accumulation of damage from multiple strikes is expected to destroy wings and control surfaces, sensors and aerodynamics, causing the target to crash. Other firing modes are designed to be effective against surface targets such as small fast attack boats.

The weapon is designed to be controlled by an external fire-control system using either radar or electro-optical trackers. It is fitted with an optional onboard observation TV camera which relays imagery to an operator console from which it can also be aimed and fired in an emergency mode. The computer system uses an open architecture and is claimed to be compatible with many existing fire control systems.

The gun's ammunition capacity allows it to engage 10 anti-ship missiles or 20 surface targets.

== Operators ==
=== Current operators ===
Denmark (7)
7 used by the Royal Danish Navy.
- Absalon-class frigate, 2 ships with 2 Millennium Gun each
- Iver Huitfeldt-class frigate, 3 ships with 1 Millennium Gun each
Indonesia (4)
2 used by the Indonesian Navy, 2 ordered for new ships.
- Martadinata-class frigate (SIGMA10514-class), 2 ships with 1 Millennium Gun each
- Balaputradewa-class frigate, 2 ships in construction, 1 Millennium Gun each
Venezuela (6)
8 guns purchased, 6 remain in service with the Venezuelan Navy.
- Guaiquerí-class patrol boat (Avante 2200-class), 3 ships in service, 1 removed from service, 1 Millennium Gun each
- Guaicamacuto-class patrol boat (Avante 1400-class), 3 ships in service, 1 lost, 1 Millennium Gun each

=== Future operators ===
Bulgaria (2)
2 to enter service with the Bulgarian Navy:
- 2 MMPV 90 corvettes in construction, 1 Millennium Gun each
Romania (2)
2 to enter service with the Romanian Naval Forces:
- Romanian frigate Regele Ferdinand and Romanian frigate Regina Maria (F222), 1 Millennium Gun each
Saudi Arabia (5)
5 to enter service with the Royal Saudi Navy:
- Al Jubail-class corvette (Avante 2200-class), 5 ships to enter service service, 1 Millennium Gun each

=== Retired ===
United States
Experimental ship from Lockheed Martin and the Office of Naval Research.
- 1 Sea Slice experimental ship, 1 Millennium Gun

== See also ==
- Rheinmetall Sea Snake 30 mm
- Nächstbereichschutzsystem MANTIS - ground-based C-RAM by Rheinmetall using same gun
- Oerlikon 35 mm twin cannon - earlier system using AHEAD rounds
- Aselsan Gökdeniz - comparable Turkish system
- Denel 35mm Dual Purpose Gun - comparable South African CIWS
- OSU-35K - comparable Polish system
