= Gratian Anda =

Swiss business magnate

- Born: Gratian Dietrich Bela Anda; 1969 (age 56–57); Zurich, Switzerland
- Education: Freies Gymnasium Zürich; ETH Zurich; Rice University
- Occupations: Businessman, philanthropist
- Known for: IHAG; Barilla; Pilatus Aircraft; Foundation E.G. Bührle
- Spouse: Lidia Anda (m. 2010)
- Parent(s): Géza Anda; Hortense Anda-Bührle
- Relatives: Emil Georg Bührle (grandfather); Dieter Bührle (uncle)

Gratian Dietrich Bela Anda (born 1969) is a Swiss business magnate and industrial heir who is currently the controlling shareholder of IHAG. He also holds participations in companies such as Barilla, Pilatus Aircraft and hospitality ventures (Widder and Storchen Hotels in Zürich). Anda is also a member of the board of trustees of Foundation E.G. Bührle. Bilanz estimated the net worth of the Anda-Bührle family at CHF 800m+ (2023).

== Life and education ==
Anda was born in 1969 in Zürich, Switzerland, the only child, to Géza Anda, a Hungarian-born pianist, and Hortense Anda-Bührle (née Bührle).

His maternal family hailed from Baden-Württemberg and settled in Switzerland in the 1920s, becoming Swiss citizens in Zurich in 1937. His grandfather, Emil Georg Bührle, was the controlling majority owner of Oerlikon-Bührle, founder of Foundation E.G. Bührle and once the richest Swiss citizen. His paternal family hailed from Budapest, Hungary.

Anda completed his primary education in Sankt Anton, Austria since his parents wanted him schooled from age 5 (instead of 7 which is common in Switzerland). He completed his Matura aged 17, two years early, and studied at the Swiss Federal Institute of Technology (ETH) followed by additional studies at Rice University in Houston, Texas.

== Career ==
Anda started his career at McKinsey & Company where he was employed until 1998. Soon thereafter he began engaging the family business IHAG which holds participations across a variety of industries. Since 2005, he has been the leading force behind the group.

== Personal life ==
Anda is a resident of Feusisberg, Switzerland. Since 2010, he has been married to Lidia Anda, with whom he has no children.
