= Hortense Anda-Bührle =

Swiss businesswoman (1926-2014)

- Born: Isabella Katharina Alix Hortense Bührle; May 18, 1926; Zürich, Switzerland
- Died: May 16, 2014 (aged 87); Zürich, Switzerland
- Education: Hochalpines Institut Ftan; St. Georges School, Clarens
- Occupations: Businesswoman; art curator; philanthropist
- Years active: 1956 - 2014
- Spouse: Géza Anda (m. 1964; died 1978)
- Children: Gratian Anda

Isabella Katharina Alix Hortense Anda-Bührle known as Hortense Anda-Bührle (née Bührle; May 18, 1926 – May 16, 2014) Swiss businesswoman, art collector and philanthropist. She was the daughter of Emil Georg Bührle, who was the majority owner of Oerlikon-Bührle and long-term trustee and curator of Foundation E. G. Bührle.

== Early life ==
Bührle was born in Zürich, Switzerland, to German parents Emil Georg Bührle and his wife Wilhelmine Charlotte (née Schalk). She did acquire Swiss citizenship only in 1937 by derivation of her parents naturalization. Her father initially was the general director and later majority owner of the machinery concern Oerlikon. Her older brother was Dieter Bührle. Her mother hailed from a banking dynasty of Magdeburg, which would later finance the majority of the acquisition of the concern. She attended the Swiss private boarding school, Hochalpines Institut Ftan, in Ftan, Grisons as well as St. Georges School in Clarens.

== Career ==
In 1956, when her father died, she inherited a large stake of shares in the Oerlikon-Bührle concern. Ultimately she held several active board memberships in Oerlikon, Bally as well as privately owned and controlled IHAG Holding and IHAG Privatbank. She was also a shareholder in the Italian pasta manufacturer Barilla. She was also owner of the Hotel Storchen Zürich and Castello del Sole in Ascona, Switzerland.

Anda-Bührle founded the Géza Anda Foundation in 1978 in memory of her husband Géza Anda and was its chair until her death. In promotion of young pianists, she held the annual Concours Géza Anda. Together with her brother, she did also inherit the art collection of her late father, which in 1960 led to the establishment of Foundation E. G. Bührle in Zürich, in the former family house. Since October 9, 2021 some paintings are exhibited in a newly added wing at Kunsthaus Zürich. Anda-Bührle was also a member of the board of trustees of the Kunsthistorisches Institut Florenz in Florence, Italy, Ittingen Charterhouse and Goethe-Stiftung für Kunst und Wissenschaft in Zürich.

== Personal life ==
In 1964, Bührle married the Hungarian-born pianist Géza Anda. They had one son;

- Gratian Dietrich Bela Anda known as Gratian Anda (born 1969), who is primarily known for his involvement in Barilla and Pilatus Aircraft, but also for his hospitality ventures.

Anda-Bührle died on May 16, 2014, aged 87.
