= Géza Anda =

Hungarian-born Swiss pianist and conductor (1921–1976)

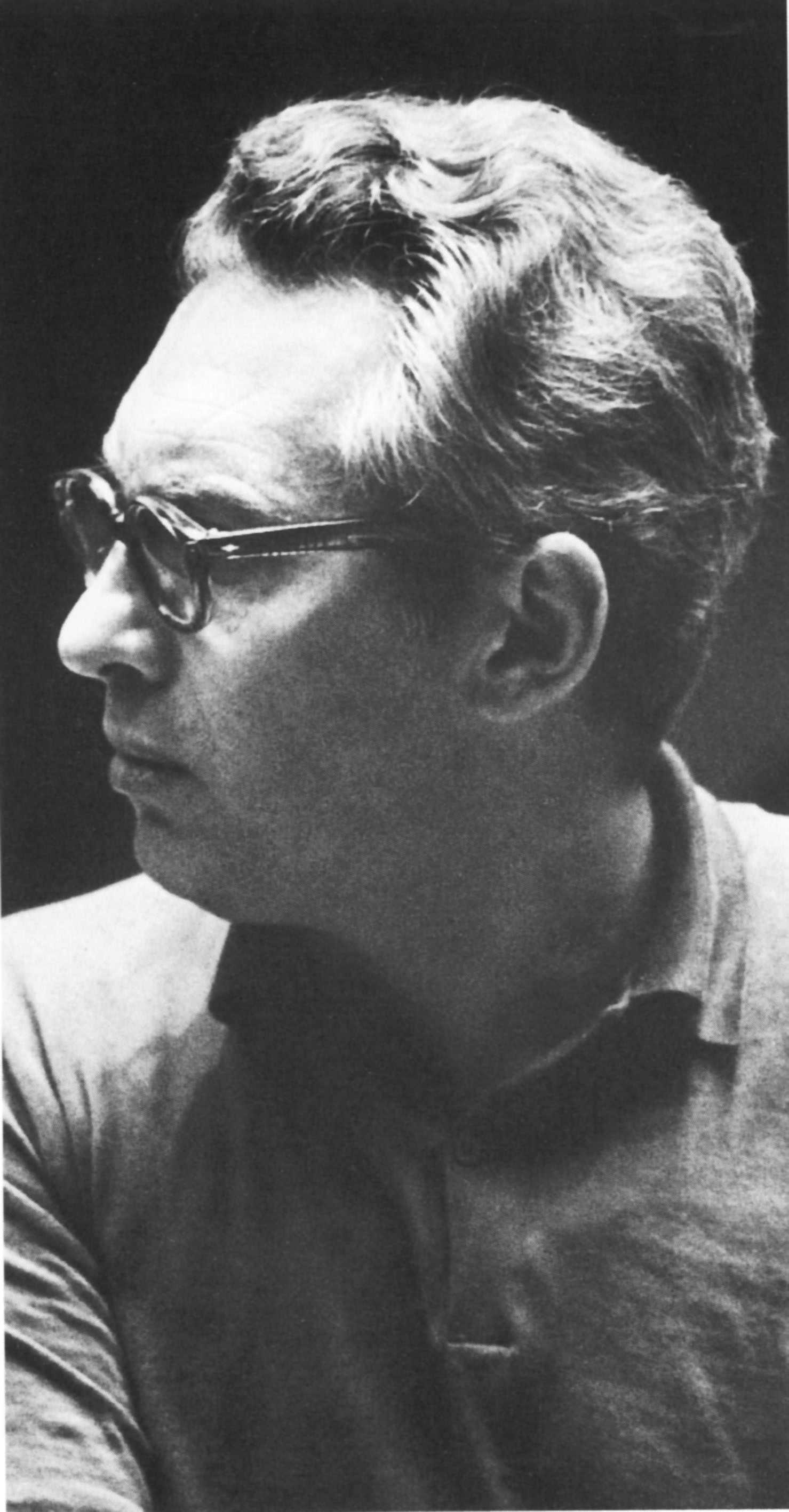
- Géza Anda in 1967
- Born: Géza Anda; 19 November 1921; Budapest, Hungary
- Died: 13 June 1976 (aged 54); Zurich, Switzerland
- Spouses: Helene Winterstein-Bosshard (m. 1953; div. 1963) Hortense Bührle (m. 1964)
- Children: Gratian Anda

Géza Anda (Hungarian pronunciation: [ˈɡeːzɒ ˈɒndɒ]; 19 November 1921 – 13 June 1976) was a Swiss-Hungarian pianist. A celebrated interpreter of classical and romantic repertoire, particularly for performances and recordings of Mozart, he was also acclaimed as an interpreter of Beethoven, Schumann, Brahms and Bartók and admired for his technique. Most of his recordings were made on the Deutsche Grammophon label.

== Early years and education ==
Géza Anda was born in 1921 in Budapest. He studied with Imre Stefaniai and Imre Keéri-Szántó, then became a pupil of Ernst von Dohnányi and Zoltán Kodály at the Franz Liszt Academy in Budapest. In 1940 he won the Liszt Prize, and in the next year, he made an international name for himself with his performance of Brahms's Piano Concerto No. 2. In 1941, he also made his debut with the Berlin Philharmonic under Wilhelm Furtwängler, who dubbed him "troubadour of the piano." In 1943, he settled in Switzerland.

== Career ==
In the mid-1950s, Anda gave masterclasses at the Salzburg Mozarteum, and in 1960 he took the position of director of the Lucerne masterclasses, succeeding Edwin Fischer. His students included Per Enflo, who later became renowned for his work in mathematical analysis.

As a performer, Anda was particularly noted for his interpretation of Schumann's and Brahms's piano music. The New Grove Dictionary of Music and Musicians cites his "charismatic readings of Bartók and Schumann". He was regarded as one of the principal Bartók interpreter of his generation. Although he played very little Mozart in his early career, he became the first pianist to record the full cycle of Mozart's piano concerti; he recorded them between 1961 and 1969, conducting the orchestra from the keyboard.

His performance of the Andante from Mozart's Piano Concerto No. 21 in C on the soundtrack of the 1967 film Elvira Madigan led to the epithet "Elvira Madigan" often being applied to the concerto. For his recording of Mozart's Piano Concertos No. 17 and No. 21 with the Camerata Academica Salzburg, he received the Grand Prix du Disque in 1963. His album, Mozart: Piano Concertos Nos. 17 & 21, peaked at No. 115 on the US Billboard Top LPs during a seventeen-week run on the chart in 1968.

"From the outset of his career, he was what one might call a philosopher-virtuoso. In his lifelong quest for the perfect balance of head and heart, between intellect and instinct, he explored many facets of music-making." He was honored in 1965 by being named a Chevalier of the Ordre des Arts et des Lettres, and he also became an honorary member of the Royal Academy of Music in 1970.

During his career he collaborated with other directors, among which are worth highlighting Ferenc Fricsay where he joined the Berlin Radio Symphony, Claudio Abbado, Ernest Ansermet, Sir John Barbirolli, Karl Böhm, Ernest Bour, Eugen Jochum, Herbert von Karajan, Joseph Keilberth, István Kertész, Otto Klemperer, Rafael Kubelík, Ferdinand Leitner, Erich Leinsdorf, Fritz Reiner, Hans Rosbaud, Sir Malcolm Sargent, Carl Schuricht, Sir Georg Solti and George Szell.

== Personal life ==
Initially, Anda married Swiss-born Helene Winterstein-Bosshard (1906-1982), who was his manager. In 1964, he married Hortense Bührle, who was the youngest child of German-born industrialist and majority owner of Oerlikon-Bührle Emil Bührle. They have one son, Gratian Dietrich Bela Anda known as Gratian Anda (born 1969).

Géza Anda died on 13 June 1976 in Zurich, Switzerland. His cause of death was esophageal cancer.

== See also ==
- Concours Géza Anda
- Great Pianists of the 20th Century – Géza Anda
