= Dieter Bührle =

Swiss industrialist, businessman, field handball player and rower

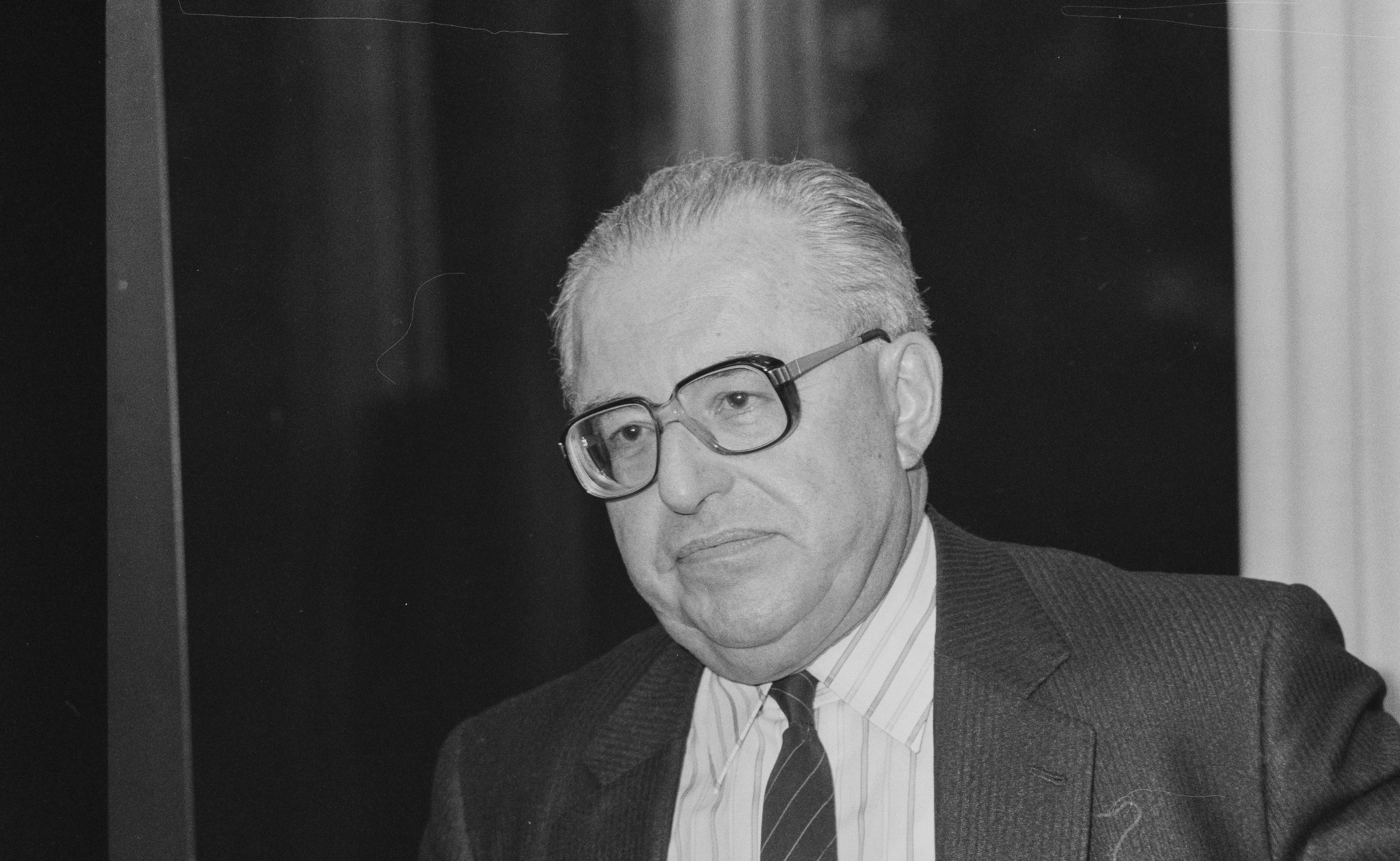

Personal information
- Birth name: Ernst Joseph Sylvester Dietrich Bührle
- Nickname: "Dida"
- Born: December 31, 1921; Ilsenburg, Saxony-Anhalt, Germany
- Died: November 9, 2012 (aged 90); Zollikon, Zürich, Switzerland
- Education: University of Zürich (Licentiate)
- Occupations: Businessman; Goalkeeper
- Spouse: Dorothea Meier

Sport
- Club: Grasshopper Club Zürich

Ernst Joseph Sylvester Dietrich Bührle known as Dieter Bührle (December 31, 1921 – November 9, 2012) was a Swiss industrialist, businessman, field handball player and rower. He was the only son of Emil Georg Bührle, majority owner of Oerlikon-Bührle and founder of Foundation E. G. Bührle. He was among the richest Swiss citizens.

== Early life and education ==
Bührle was born December 31, 1921, in Ilsenburg, Saxony-Anhalt, Germany to Emil Georg Bührle and Wilhelmine Charlotte Schalk (1896-1979). His father was a director at Magdeburger Werkzeugmaschinenfabrik (today EMCO) at the time. His mother hailed from a Magdeburg banking dynasty. In 1924, the family relocated to Zürich, where his father took-over the management of Oerlikon. He had one younger sister, Hortense, with whom he'd later became the trustees of Foundation E. G. Bührle. Since 1937, the family only held Swiss citizenship. He holds a licentiate degree in law from the University of Zürich (class of 1953).

== Career ==
In 1953, he entered the family concern known as Oerlikon-Bührle, initially becoming a project manager for factories in Egypt and India. When his father died in 1956, Bührle took over the management of the company, which employed up to 37,000 people at the time and was the largest Swiss concern. With his sister, Bührle co-founded IHAG Holding, which held all industrial participations of the family, including 42% of Oerlikon-Bührle. He had intentions to study Art history, but for the majority of the career led the business for a mere of 37 years before ultimately retiring. After the Nigerian Civil War in 1970, Bührle was sentenced to a suspended prison sentence and penalty payments due to unauthorized weapons deliveries. A major consequence was that he had to leave his position of Colonel in the Swiss Armed Forces.

Bührle developed strategies to expand the business from armament orders to the civil sector. In 1977, he acquired Bally, Balzers Vacuum Technics, Limmat Insurance Company and the Hotel Zürich in Zürich. Due to development of a surface-to-air missile the concern had financial turbulences. In 1990, Bührle stepped back from management, and it was ultimately sold to Unaxis. He turned his activities towards his family holding, which also included a private bank, Hotel Storchen Zürich, Hotel Castello del Sole in Ascona as well as a farm in the Maggia valley and a winery in Tuscany. In 2010, he sold a 50% stake of the operating company of St. Gallen-Altenrhein Airport, to Markus Kopf.

== Personal life ==
Bührle was married to Dorothea Meier. They had two children; Christian Bührle and Carole Bührle Franz (née Bührle). He resided in Zollikon near Zürich where he died aged 90 on November 9, 2012.
