= RSE =

RSE may refer to:

- Relationship and Sex Education, an education curriculum in United Kingdom schools
- Ramtha's School of Enlightenment, a spiritual school in the United States
- Realistic Sound Engine, a sound output format in Guitar Pro
- Red Seal Endorsement, post-nominal letters signifying attainment of Canada's official journeyperson certification in the trades
- Red Storm Entertainment, a video game company
- Refractory status epilepticus, the persistent form of status epilepticus despite intervention
- Relative standard error, a measure of a statistical estimate's reliability
- Rensselaer Society of Engineers, a local fraternity at Rensselaer Polytechnic Institute, state of New York
- Research software engineering, the use of software engineering practices in research
- Rhein-Sieg-Eisenbahn, a German railway company
- the IATA airport code of Rose Bay Water Airport, a water airport located in the suburb of Rose Bay in Sydney, Australia
- Royal Society of Edinburgh, Scotland's national academy of science and letters
- Rwanda Stock Exchange, a stock exchange in Rwanda
- Pokémon Ruby and Sapphire and Pokémon Emerald, the three main titles of the third generation of the Pokémon series

== See also ==
- the Rosenberg self-esteem scale (RSES)
- RSE Kriens (missile), a Swiss-developed air defence missile
- Békéscsabai RSE, a Hungarian women's volleyball club
- the Odakyu 20000 series RSE, an electric multiple unit (EMU) train type in Japan
