= RSA (missile) =

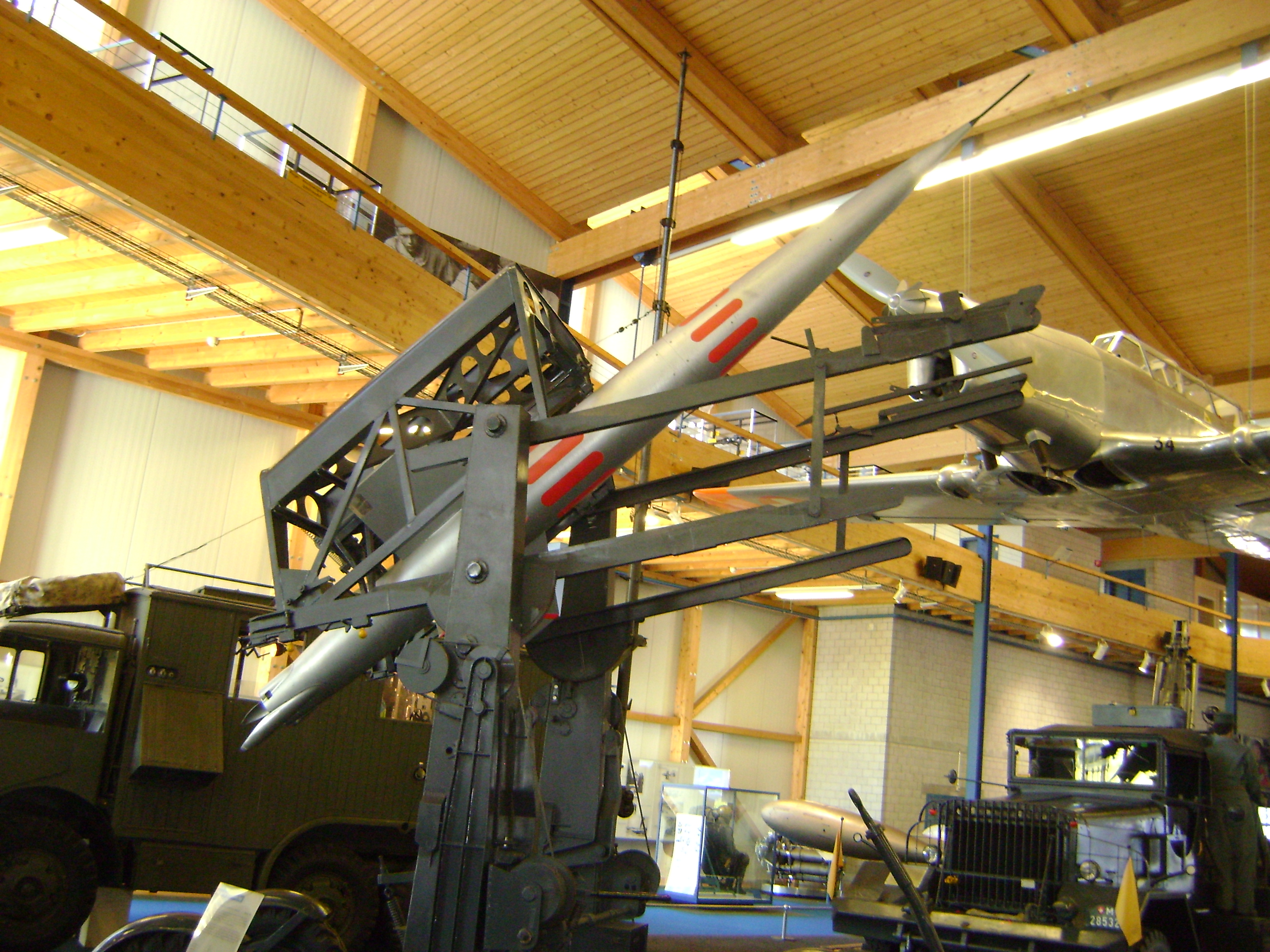
- RSA in Startlafette
- Type: Surface-to-air missile
- Place of origin: Switzerland

Production history
- Designed: 1946 - 1958
- Manufacturer: Oerlikon Contraves

Specifications
- Mass: Missile: 400 kg, Carrier wagon without Missile: 4000 kg
- Diameter: 40 cm
- Wingspan: 140 cm
- Warhead: 40 kg warhead
- Engine: nitric acid and kerosene
- Maximum speed: Mach 1.8
- Guidance system: Beam-riding
- Steering system: control surfaces
- Launch platform: vehicle or trailer

The RSA is one of the earliest surface-to-air missiles systems, developed by the Swiss companies Oerlikon-Bührle and Contraves starting in 1947. The missile went through a rapid development process with several upgraded versions, and was the first anti-aircraft missile offered for commercial sale when it was placed on the market in the RSC-50 form. The US tested 25 of the slightly different RSC-51 model under the name MX-1868. No further sales were forthcoming. Several improved versions followed, including the RSC-54, RSC-56, RSC-57 and RSC/RSD-58. These saw small numbers of sales, mostly as training rounds.

== History ==
=== Background ===
Oerlikon had been a leader in the development of anti-aircraft weapons after its purchase of the SEMAG company in 1924, and the subsequent takeover by Emil Georg Bührle the next year. Their most famous products were the variety of Oerlikon 20 mm cannon that started at SEMAG and underwent considerable further development prior to the opening of World War II. By this time two developments were widely known and used, the Oerlikon FF in the aircraft role, and the Oerlikon SS which was widely used by many naval forces as a short-range anti-aircraft weapon, and in Canadian service, a light-anti-ship and anti-submarine weapon.

By the mid-war period, most of the armies concluded that anti-aircraft artillery was practically useless against high-flying targets, and would become completely so with the introduction of jet engines. The Germans, British and US all began guided missile efforts to fill this role, hoping to replace heavy anti-aircraft artillery. None of these designs would come into service during the war, although the German Wasserfall missile was the closest to a practical service-quality device.

With the ending of the war, news of these developments quickly spread into the weapons community, and Oerlikon, among others, began their own missile development programs.

=== Development ===
The RSA was developed in partnership by Oerlikon-Bührle and Contraves, starting in 1947. Development proceeded quickly, and the system was first offered for commercial sale in 1950 as the RSC-50 (if a RSB version existed it is not recorded in the few sources covering this system). Development continued, and by the next year twenty-five of the slightly improved RSC-51 were purchased by the US Army as experimental rounds. They were tested under the name MX-1868 by the Air Force Missile Development Center at Holloman Air Force Base in 1952.

=== Further development ===
Development of the basic concept continued, with various release versions being the RSC-54, RSC-56, RSC-57, and finally the RSD-58. All of these used similar guidance systems, with variations to the missile being more prominent.

=== Use ===
The RSA series saw little or no use in the anti-aircraft role, and only small numbers of the armed version appear to have been produced. It did see some use as a training round, by replacing the warhead with a parachute system that allowed recovery and reuse of the missiles. Small numbers of these designs appear to have been sold to Switzerland, Italy, Sweden and Japan.

== Description ==
The RSA was a long, thin missile with a very high fineness ratio, similar to modern supersonic aircraft like the Concorde. It mounted four almost rectangular cropped-delta wings at the fuselage midpoint, and used thrust vectoring for directional control. Power was provided by a liquid fuel rocket engine burning nitric acid and kerosene as fuel, with the fuel driven into the engine via nitrogen gas pressurization.

Guidance was provided by a Brown-Boveri radar system and beam riding receivers on the missile. Beam riding systems are the simplest systems to implement, as the ground-based system can consist solely of a tracking radar. The target is first picked up on the radar system and "locked on". The missile is launched directly into the path of the radar, allowing receivers at the back of the missile to hear the radar signal and keep itself centred in the beam. The missile then flies directly at the target as long as the radar remains locked on.

One disadvantage of this approach is that the radar signal is cone-shaped, so the missile becomes increasingly inaccurate as it flies away from the radar. The RSA solved this by using a second radio signal for beam riding, allowing the tracking radar to have a wider search angle without effecting the accuracy of the missile.

The entire launcher system was based on two carriages adapted from the 34mm Flab.Kan. 38, a pre-war design that would be replaced by the famed 35mm KD series gun in the post-war era. One carriage held the radar and guidance radio antenna on a rotating mount, and the other held the missile in a trapeze-like framework of some complexity.

Follow-on versions used similar guidance systems, and varied more widely in the mounting of the missile. Dual mountings were common, and the launchers were generally much less complex than the original RSA version.

Oerlikon-Buehrle created with this missile, the basis for the development of the missile system RSC / D, also named RSD 58. RSA and a missile launch their carriage is on display at the Flieger-Flab-Museum Dübendorf.

- launcher
- Chassis of 34mm anti aircraft gun 38
- Length = 6.5 m
- Width = 2.0 m
- Height = 1.5 m (in driving mode)

== Target tracking radar and beacon ==
Mounted on the trailer-base of the 34 mm cannon Flab 38, the target tracking and illumination radar has a three-axis alignment system for the tracking antenna and the guiding beacon. It can precisely track overhead targets. The missile guides itself to the center of the guiding beam. It was manufactured by Contraves AG and the BBC. The target tracking system uses conical-scan radar and guidance beam,. It uses a rotating beacon with primary radiator without reflector, with electronically driven three directional axes.

- Wide= 2 m
- Height (in driving mode)= 3.5 m
- Height = 4 m
- Weight = 4 t

== Pictures ==
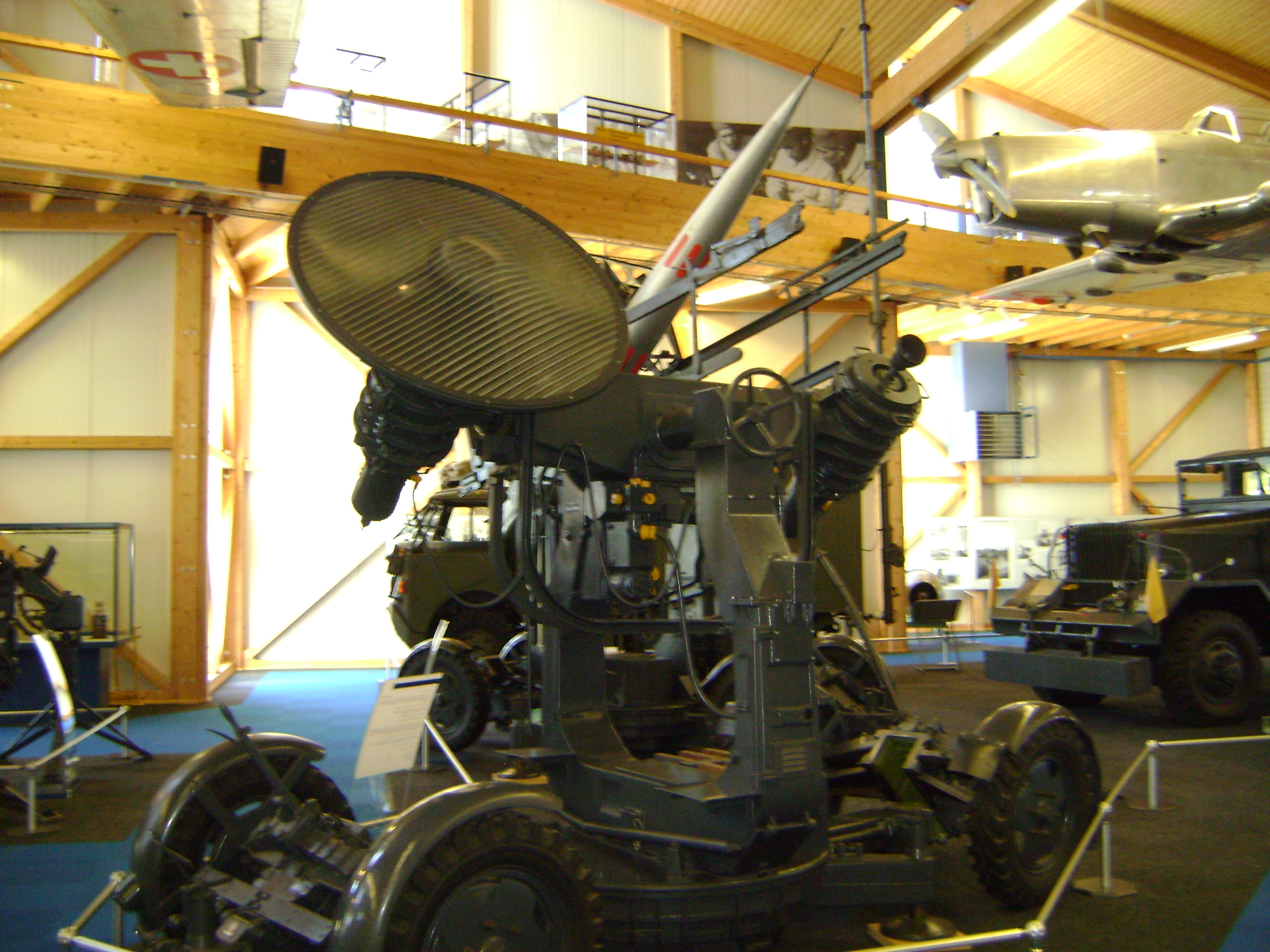
Guiding beam/target radar at Flieger-Flab-Museum

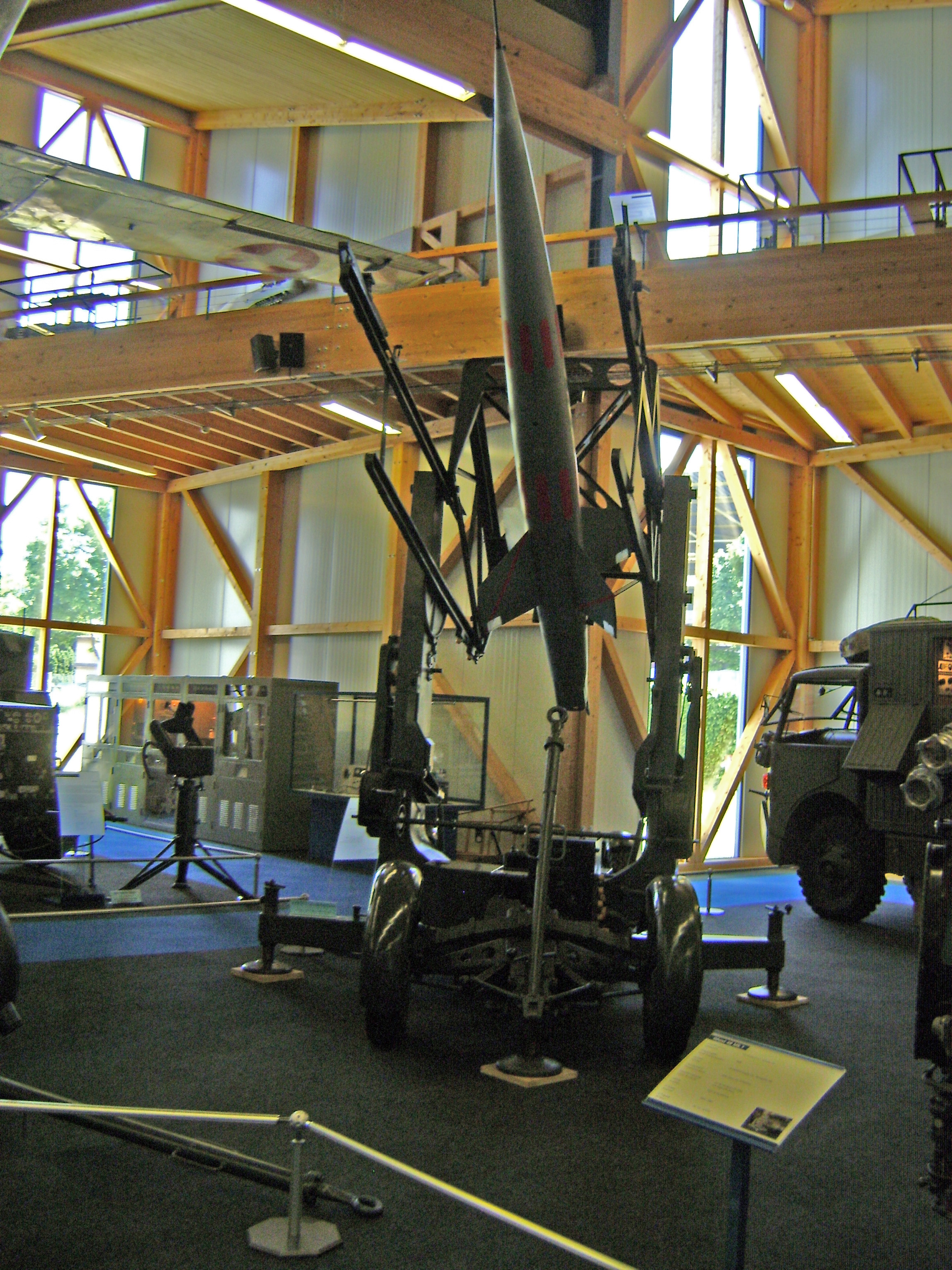
Missile on launcher wagon at Flieger-Flab-Museum
