= IHAG =

Swiss private bank

IHAG Private Bank
- Native name: Privatbank IHAG Zürich AG
- Founded: 1949; 77 years ago as Industrie- und Handelsbank AG in Zürich, Switzerland
- Founder: Emil Georg Bührle
- Headquarters: Zürich, Switzerland
- Key people: Christoph Mauchle (Chairman); Martin Keller (CEO)
- AUM: $4.5 billion (2023)
- Owner: Anda-Bührle family
- Parent: IHAG Holding Corp.
- Website: pbihag.ch

IHAG Private Bank (commonly referred to as IHAG) is a Swiss private bank which specializes in asset management. Founded in 1949, by German-born industrialist Emil Georg Bührle, its holding company currently also serves as Single Family Office to his descendants with AUM of over $4 billion (2023).

In 2013, IHAG was a participant in the Swiss Bank Program, by the U.S. Department of Justice resolving criminal liabilities in the United States. They paid a penalty of over $7m in the resolution.

== History ==
In 1949, German-born industrialist Emil Georg Bührle, formed Industrie- und Handelsbank AG (English: Bank of Industry and Commerce, Inc.) in Zürich, Switzerland primarily to finance his own industrial investments and expansion plans of Oerlikon-Bührle and to preserve his assets for future generations.

Later, the bank added services for external clients such as asset management and lending. In 1994, the name was changed, initially to IHAG Handelsbank Zürich and then ultimately to Privatbank IHAG Zürich.
