= Toni Aktuaryus =

French art dealer (1893–1946)

- Born: 1893; Paris, France
- Died: March 1946 (aged 52–53); Zürich, Switzerland
- Occupation: Art Dealer
- Known for: Founded Aktuaryus Gallery in Zurich

Toni Aktuaryus (born 1893 in Paris; died March 1946 in Zürich) was a French art dealer.

== Early life ==
Aktuaryus was a son of the art dealer and gallery owner J. F. Aktuaryus (Kunstsalon Aktuaryus), who was active in Wiesbaden at least since 1905.

== Art dealing and gallery owner ==
In 1924 he founded the Aktuaryus Gallery in Zurich,. which offered many artists an exhibition opportunity in its rooms during the Second World War. Aktuaryus was advised, among others, by the art historian Gotthard Jedlicka, who, for example, also wrote articles for the gallery's monthly magazine "Galerie und Sammler" (Gallery and Collector), which was published from 1932/33. An important Aktuaryus client was arms manufacturer and art collector, Emil Georg Bührle. Starting in 1936, Bührle purchased paintings by Corot, Monet, Pissarro, Renoir, Sisley and Cézanne from him. In 1938 Bührle purchased "Porte Saint-Martin, Paris" and in 1943 Bührle purchased "La Butte Pinson" by Maurice Utrillo from him. The lack of provenance has been a subject of controversy.

Aktuaryus was buried at the Binz cemetery on April 1, 1946.

== Restitution claims for Nazi-looted art and forced sales ==
After World War II, some of the artworks that Aktuaryus had sold were the object of restitution claims by Jewish families that had been persecuted and expropriated under the Nazis. Matisse's Odalisque with Tambourine (Harmony in Blue), which Aktuarys had sold on December 18, 1942, for CHF 14,000 to Emil Bührle, Zurich was restituted on June 3, 1948, to Paul Rosenberg. Research is ongoing concerning the provenances of artworks from the collection of Alfred and Tekla Hess.

== Literature ==
- Elisabeth Eggimann-Gerber: Am Puls der Kunstwelt: der Schweizer Kunstmarkt, die Anfänge des internationalen Kunsthandels und der Galerist und Kunsthändler Toni Aktuaryus. In: Jüdische Sammler und ihr Beitrag zur Kultur der Moderne / Jewish collectors and their contribution to modern culture. Heidelberg, S. 255–268.

== See also ==
- Martha Nothmann
- Switzerland during the World Wars
- Emil Bührle
