= Wühre =

Pedestrian-only street in Zurich, Switzerland

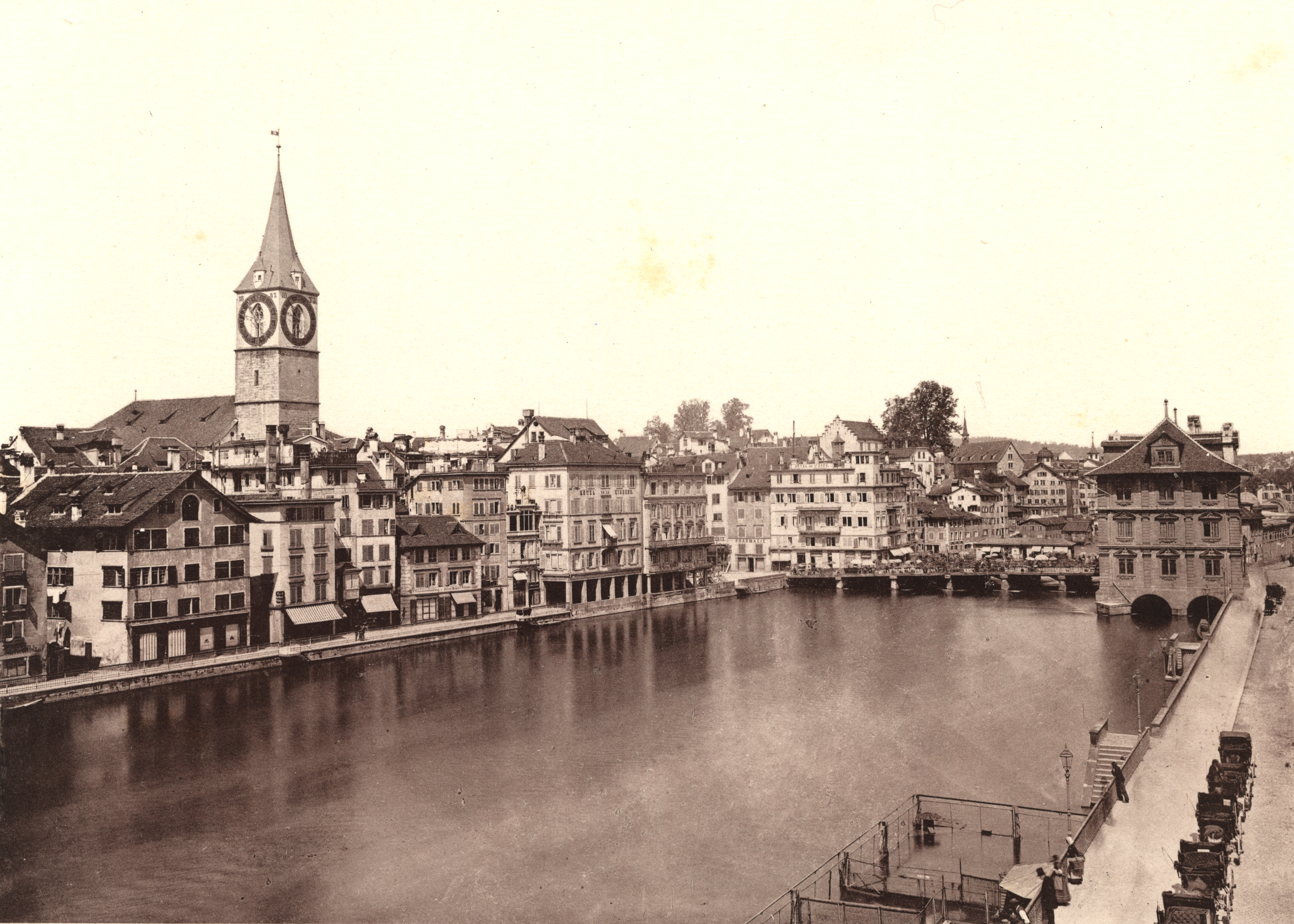
- Wühre (left) in 1882, looking north along the Limmat
- Interactive map of Wühre
- Length: 0.11 mi (0.18 km)
- Location: Zürich, Switzerland
- Coordinates: 47.36998°N 8.54189°E
- North end: Weinplatz
- South end: Münsterbrücke

Wühre, also known as Wühre an der Limmat, is an historic pedestrian-only street in the Schipfe district of Zürich, Switzerland. It runs, along the left (western) side of the Limmat river, for around 0.1 miles (0.16 km), from Weinplatz in the north to Münsterbrücke (at Münsterhof and Stadthausquai) in the south.

Hotel zum Storchen, at Weinplatz, is a popular destination for tourists. It is also a departure point for the Limmat river boat.

== Storchen ==
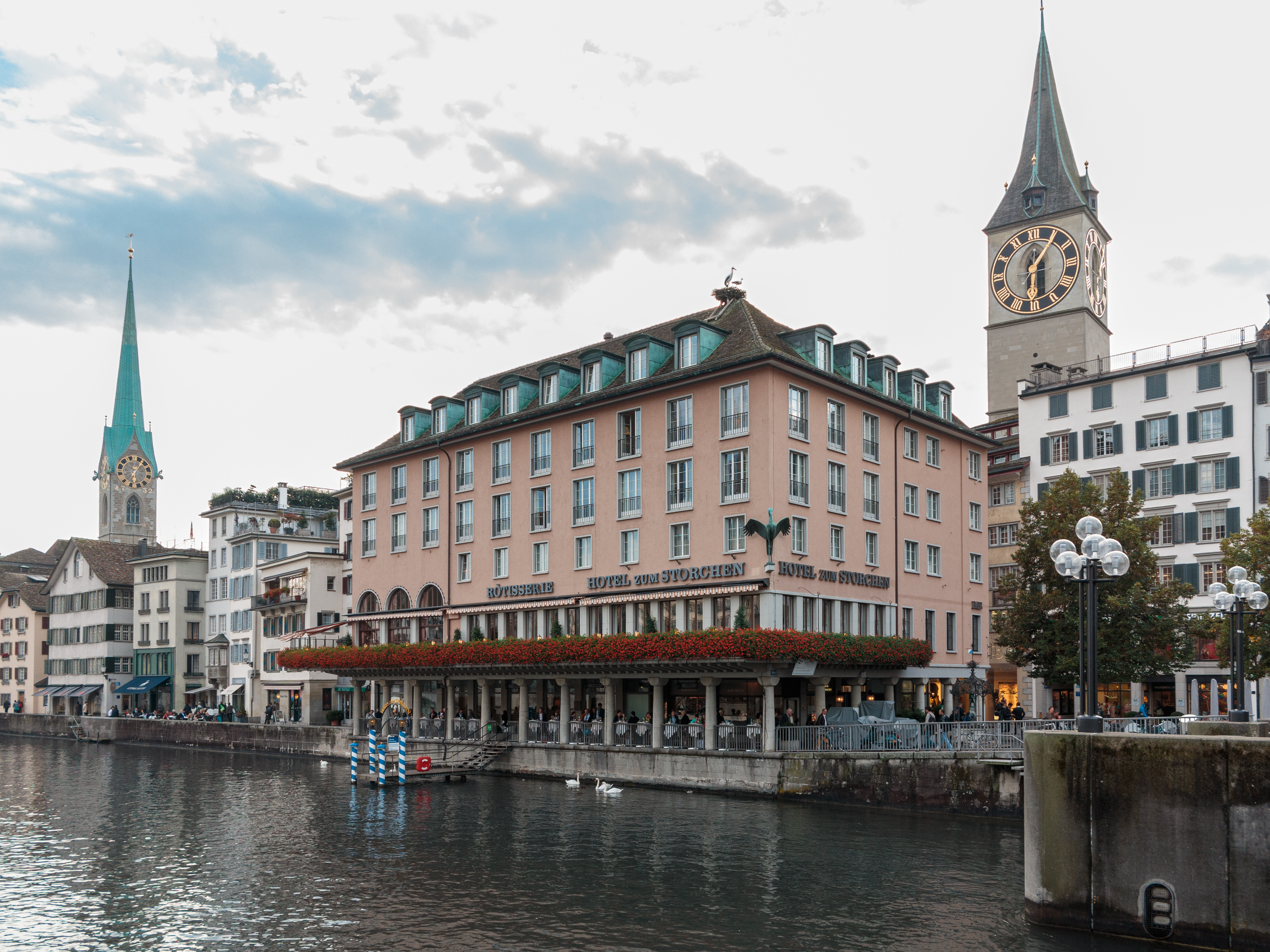
Hotel zum Storchen, established in 1357, at Weinplatz

== 18th-century view ==
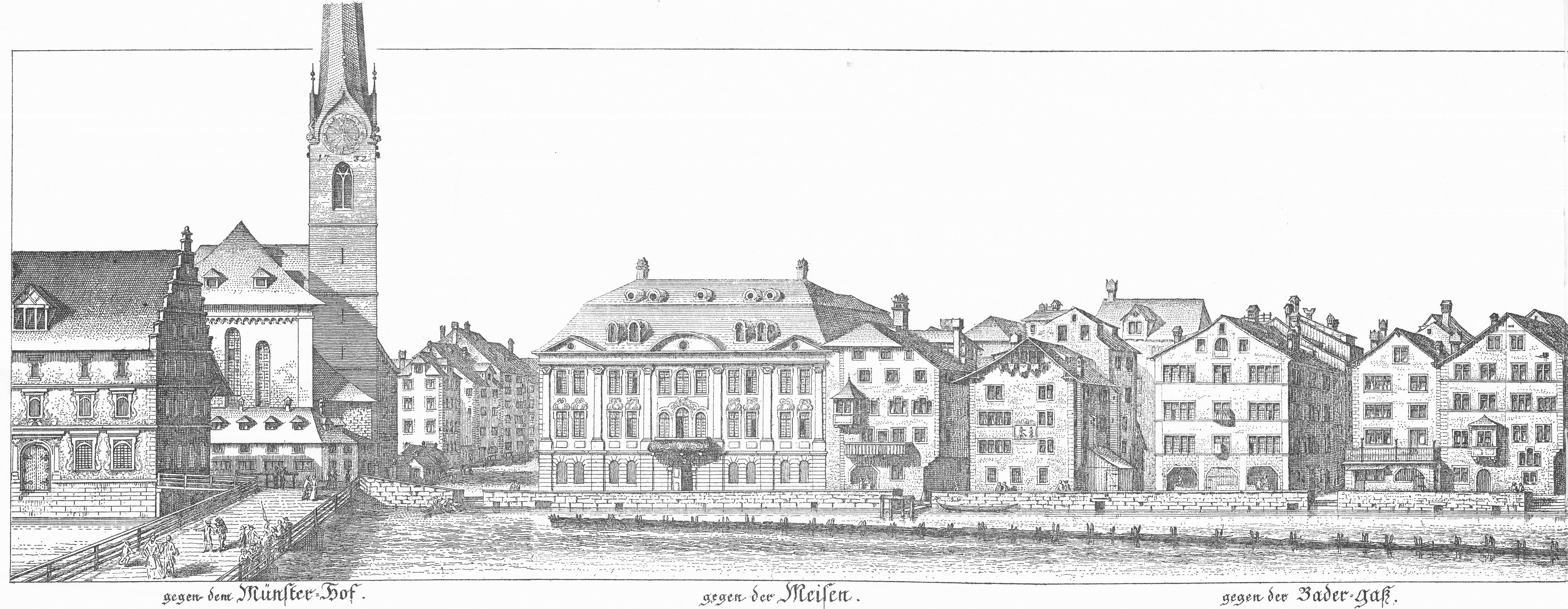
The southern end of Wühre c. 1770

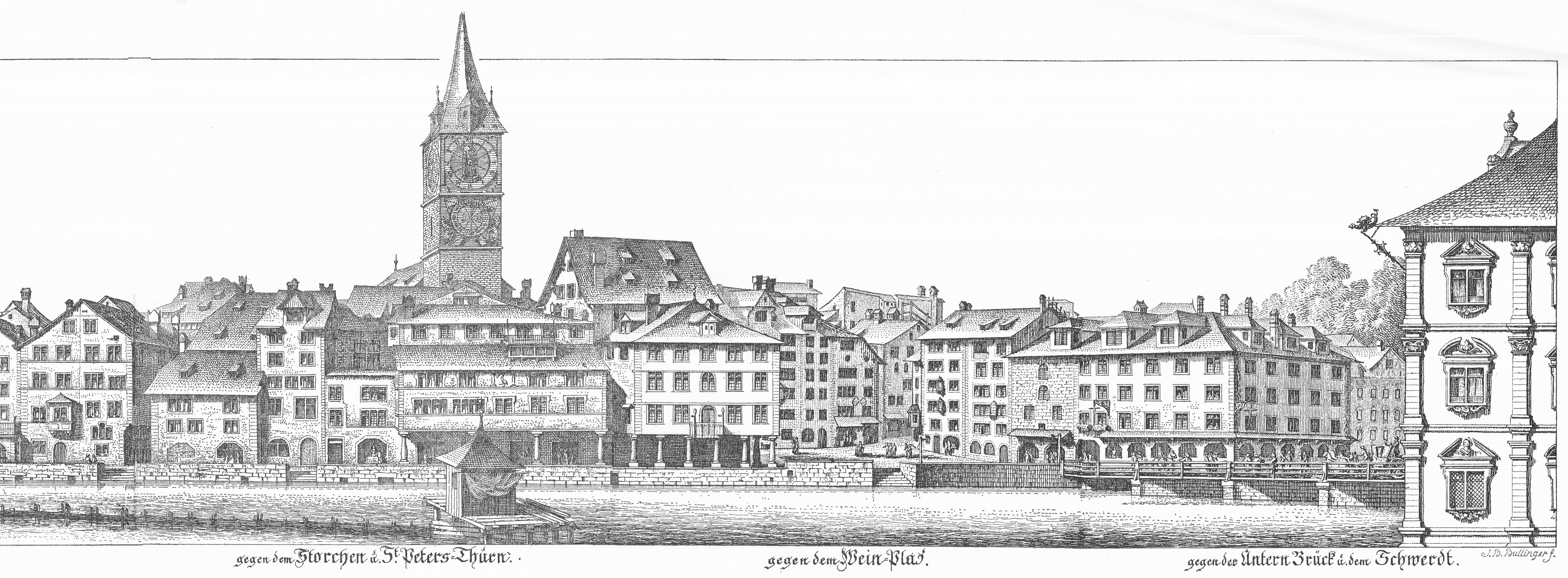
The northern end, including the Storchen, the Church of St. Peter and Weinplatz
