= Zenit-C =

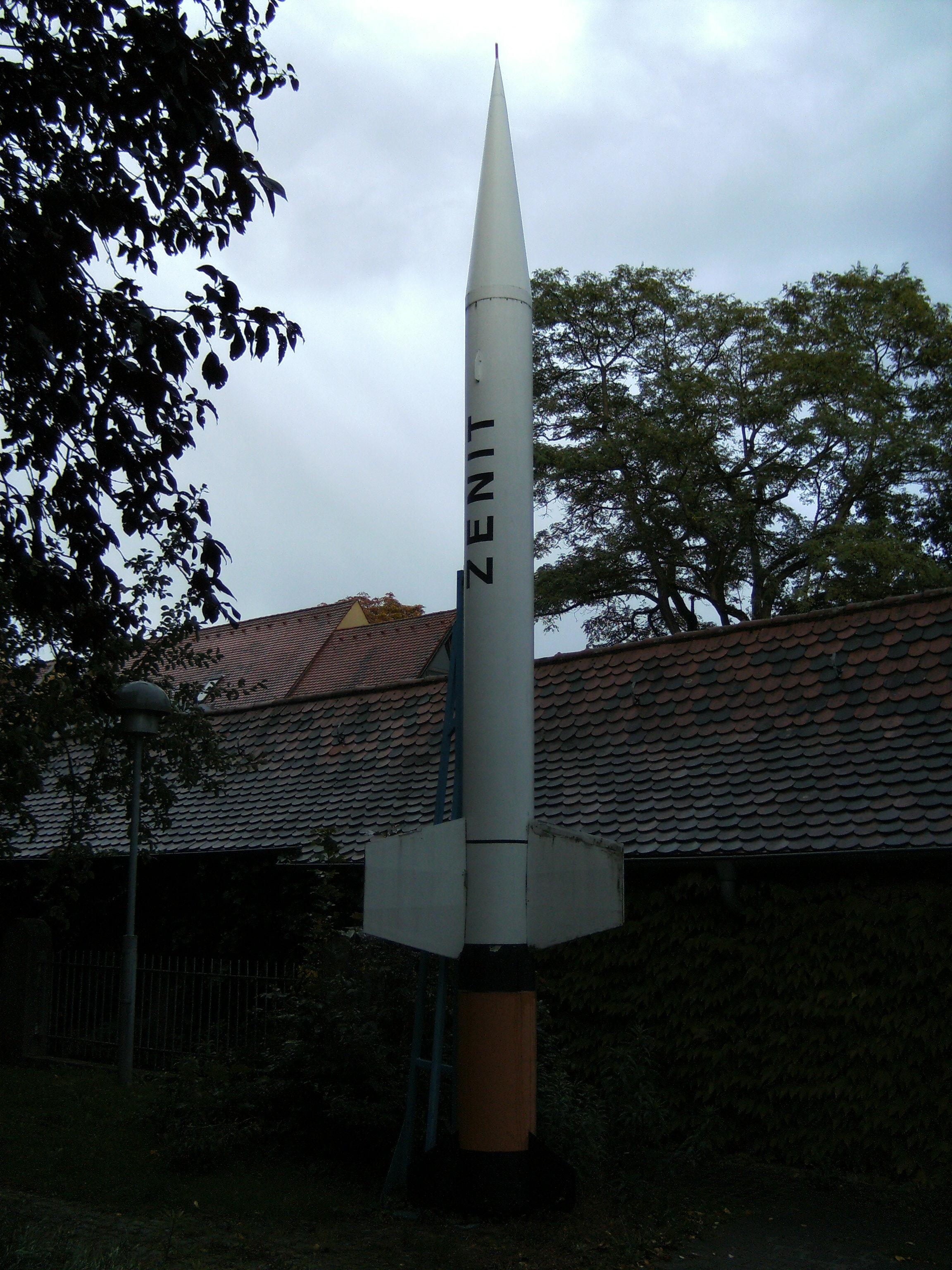
Zenit rocket on display in front of Hermann-Oberth-Museum, Feucht, Germany

Zenit-C was a sounding rocket developed by Oerlikon Contraves (today Rheinmetall Air Defence) in Switzerland. The Zenit was a single-stage rocket with a length of 5.6 meters, a diameter of 0.42 meter and a takeoff weight of 610 kilograms. Propelled by a solid-propellant engine which supplied a thrust between 45 kN at launch and 22 kN in flight, the Zenit could carry a payload of 25 kilograms to a height of 210 km or a payload of 130 kilograms to a height of 115 km. At its maiden flight on October 27, 1967, at Salto di Quirra the Zenit topped 145 km. The Zenit was later launched only twice — once on July 30, 1971, at Salto di Quirra with a British Cuckoo rocket as a starting stage and once on December 13, 1973, at Andøya likewise with a "Cuckoo" starting stage. Cuckoo was used as a starting stage on British Skylark rocket. Oerlikon used the knowledge from the Ground to Air Missile RSE Kriens for the Zenit.

== Sources ==
- Wade, Mark. "Micon Zenit". www.astronautix.com.
- Serra, Jean-Jacques. "Zenit sounding rocket". Rockets in Europe. Archived from the original on 2012-11-14.
