= RSD 58 =

RSC/D
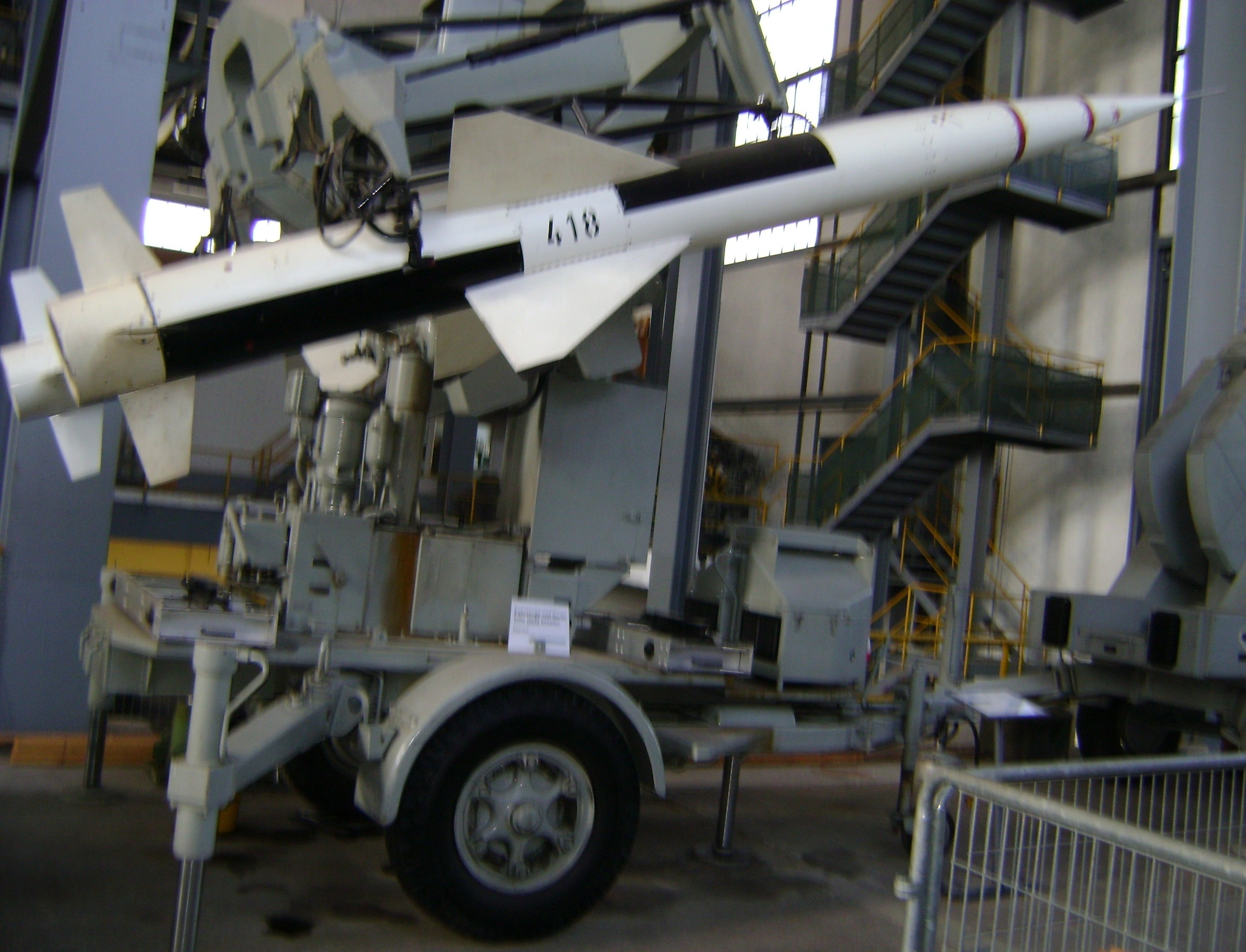
- RSC/D Missile on duplex firing carrier at Militärmuseum Full
- Type: Surface-to-air missile
- Place of origin: Switzerland

Service history
- In service: 1960–?
- Used by: Japan

Production history
- Designed: 1958
- Manufacturer: Oerlikon Contraves
- Unit cost: between $15,000 and $18,000 per round (as of June 1959)
- Produced: 1958-1960

Specifications
- Mass: missile: 400 kg, Carrier wagon: 4700 kg, Communication/steering wagon: 5500 kg
- Length: 6 m (19 ft 8 in)
- Diameter: 400 mm (15.7 in)
- Wingspan: 1,346 mm (53 in)
- Crew: 9: 1 operator, 8 Charging team
- Warhead: 40 kg warhead
- Engine: nitric acid / kerosene mixture
- Operational range: 30,000 m
- Flight ceiling: 9,000 m
- Maximum speed: Mach 2.4 (800m/s)
- Guidance system: Beam-riding
- Steering system: control surfaces
- Launch platform: vehicle or trailer

The RSD 58 is an early production surface-to-air missile system developed by Contraves-Oerlikon in Switzerland from 1947. Test firings were made in Switzerland and Italy in 1958, and Japan placed a small order for training purposes, but the missile was not produced in high numbers. The missile system was developed from the earlier RSA Missile developed by the same companies.

== Design and development ==
Contraves-Oerlikon started design work on guided missiles to supplement their anti-aircraft guns, like the popular 20 mm cannon, in 1947. The company produced a number of designs, including the RSA, culminating in the RSD 58 of 1958.

The RSD 58 was a liquid-fuelled rocket-powered missile, guided to its target by riding a radar beam. The missile body was made of wrapped tubing and sheet with Araldite bonding while the wings were of sandwich construction.

Targeting was by search radar and beam transmitter with targets tracked by a search radar until a beam riding transmitter locked on, at which point the missile could be fired, riding the beam until impact, proximity fuze or radio signal detonation. Launchers, slaved to the beam transmitter could launch missiles at any angle form 10° to 90° at a sustained rate of fire of up to two launches per minute. Control of the missiles was by vectoring rocket motor combustion chamber at launch and controllable rear fins at higher speeds.

The complete system included a battery command post, target tracking radar, guidance beam transmitter and six twin railed trainable launchers and four diesel generator units. The components were carried on single-axle trailers apart from the diesel generators that were built on two-axle trailers. The entire system, including the launchers, was readily transportable to new locations with mobility claimed to be similar to that of a heavy anti-aircraft gun system.

A parachute recoverable training round, the RSC-57, was developed which was powered by a reduced burn time rocket motor with the recovery parachute replacing the warhead.

== Operational use ==
There were no significant orders, except for the delivery of a training battery to Japan. The Swiss Air Force instead used the British Bristol Bloodhound. A twin launcher with two missiles and a trailer-mounted radar as used in the system is now at the Full Military Museum and another launcher with two missiles ca be found in the Aviation Museum in Dübendorf.

From 1959, the RSD system was further developed into the RSE, which was also unsuccessfully offered for export under as the Micon.

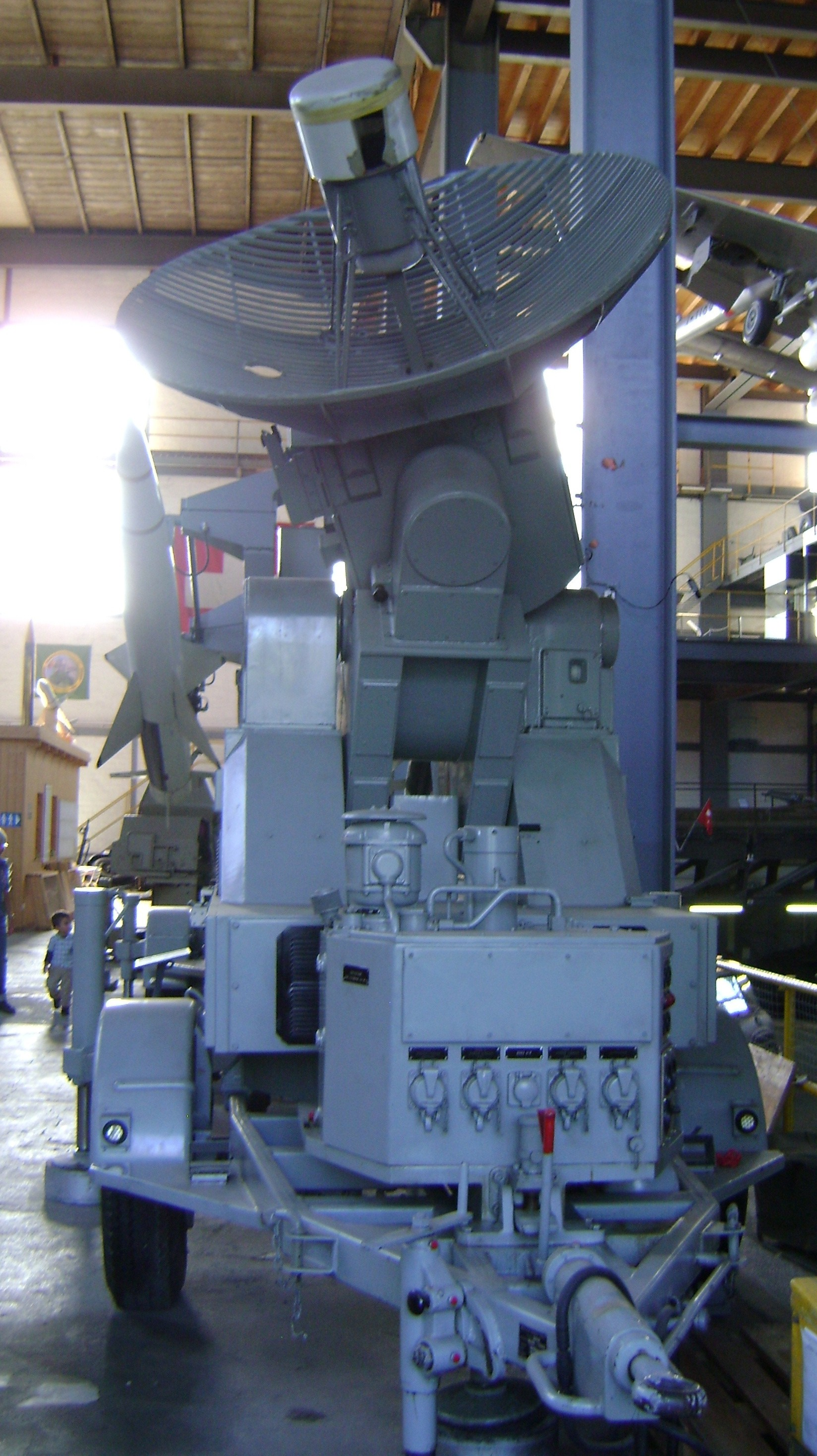

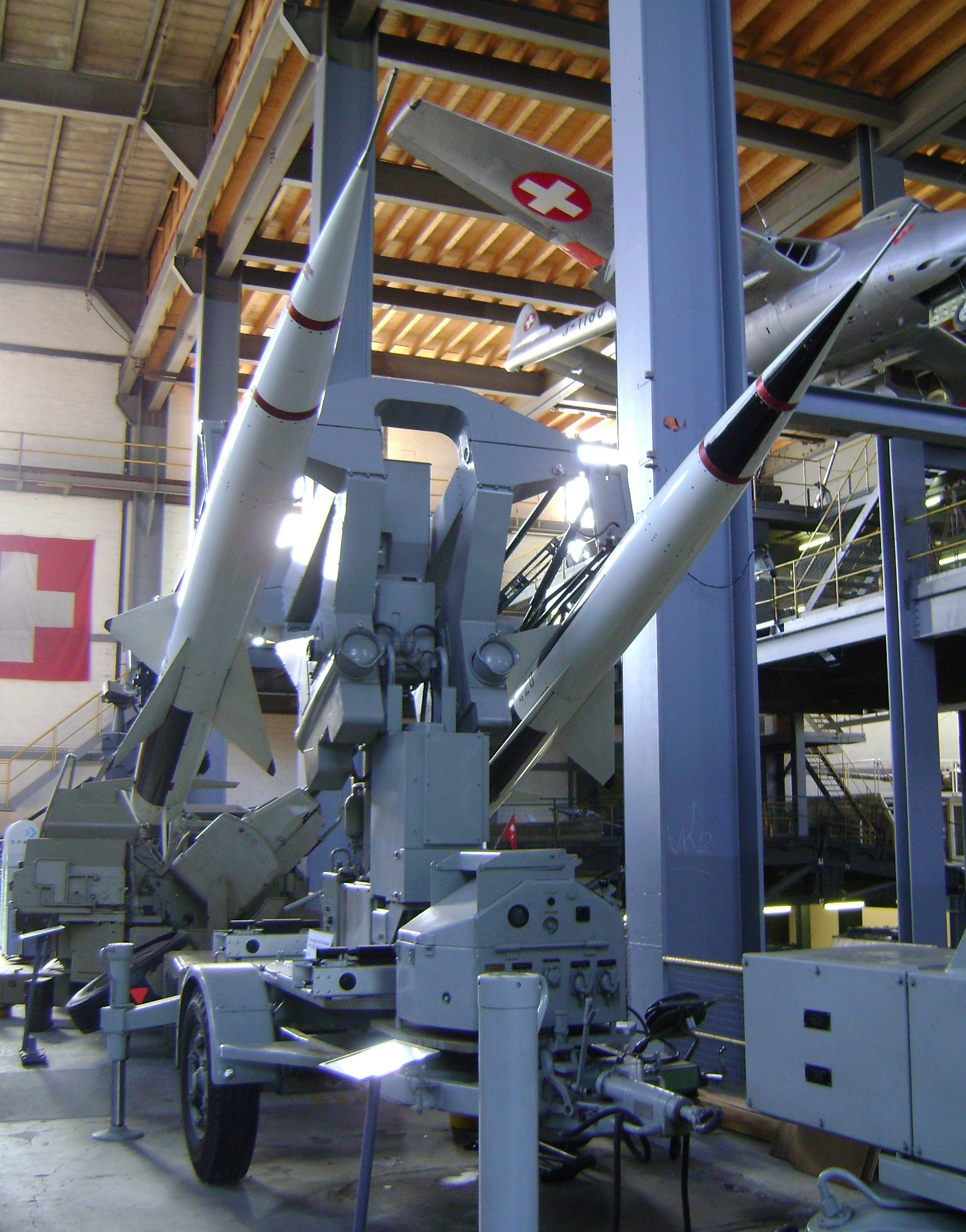

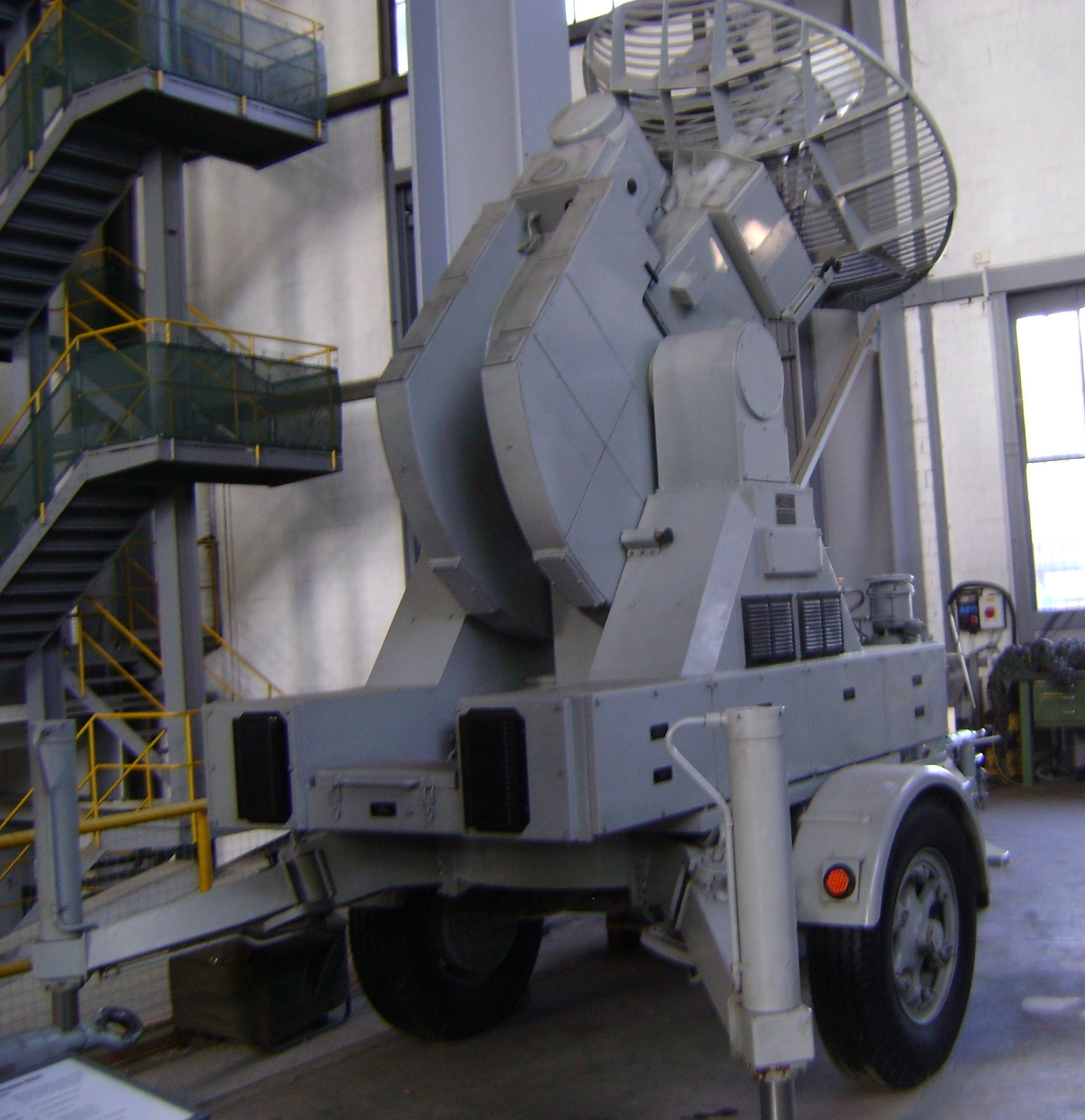

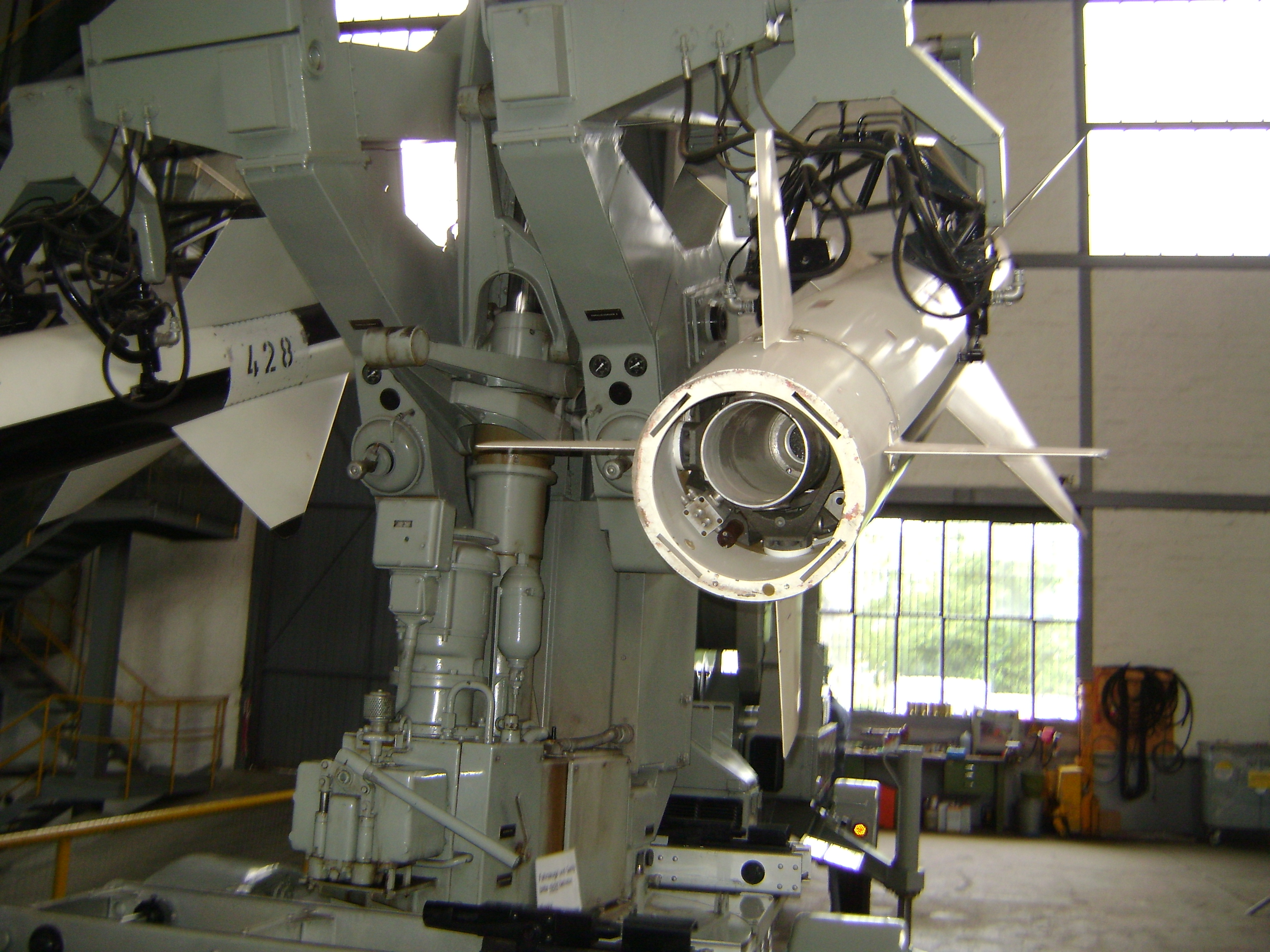

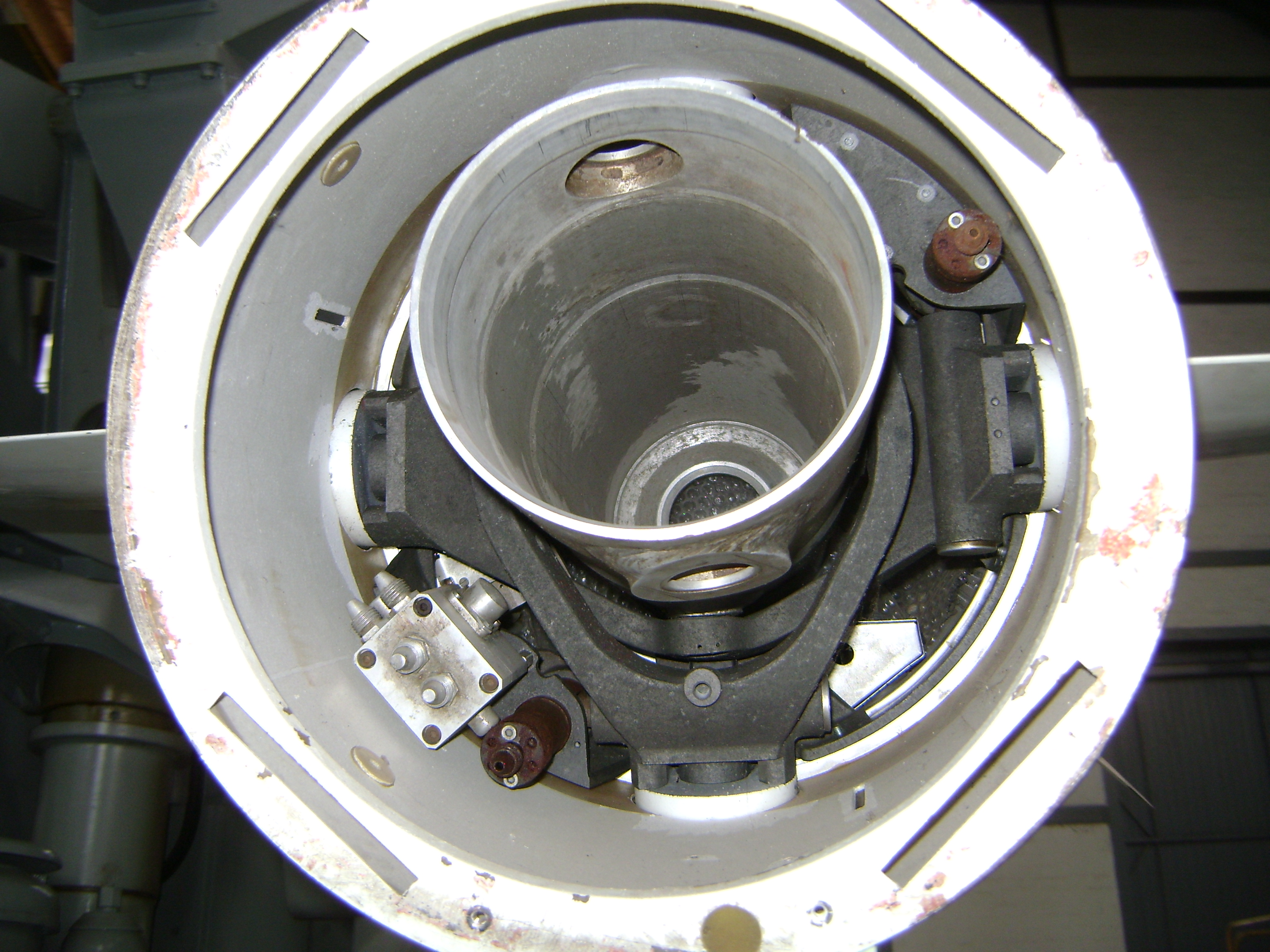

== Operators ==
- Italy - Evaluation only.
- Japan
- Switzerland - Evaluation only.
