= Hotel Storchen Zürich =

Hotel in Zurich

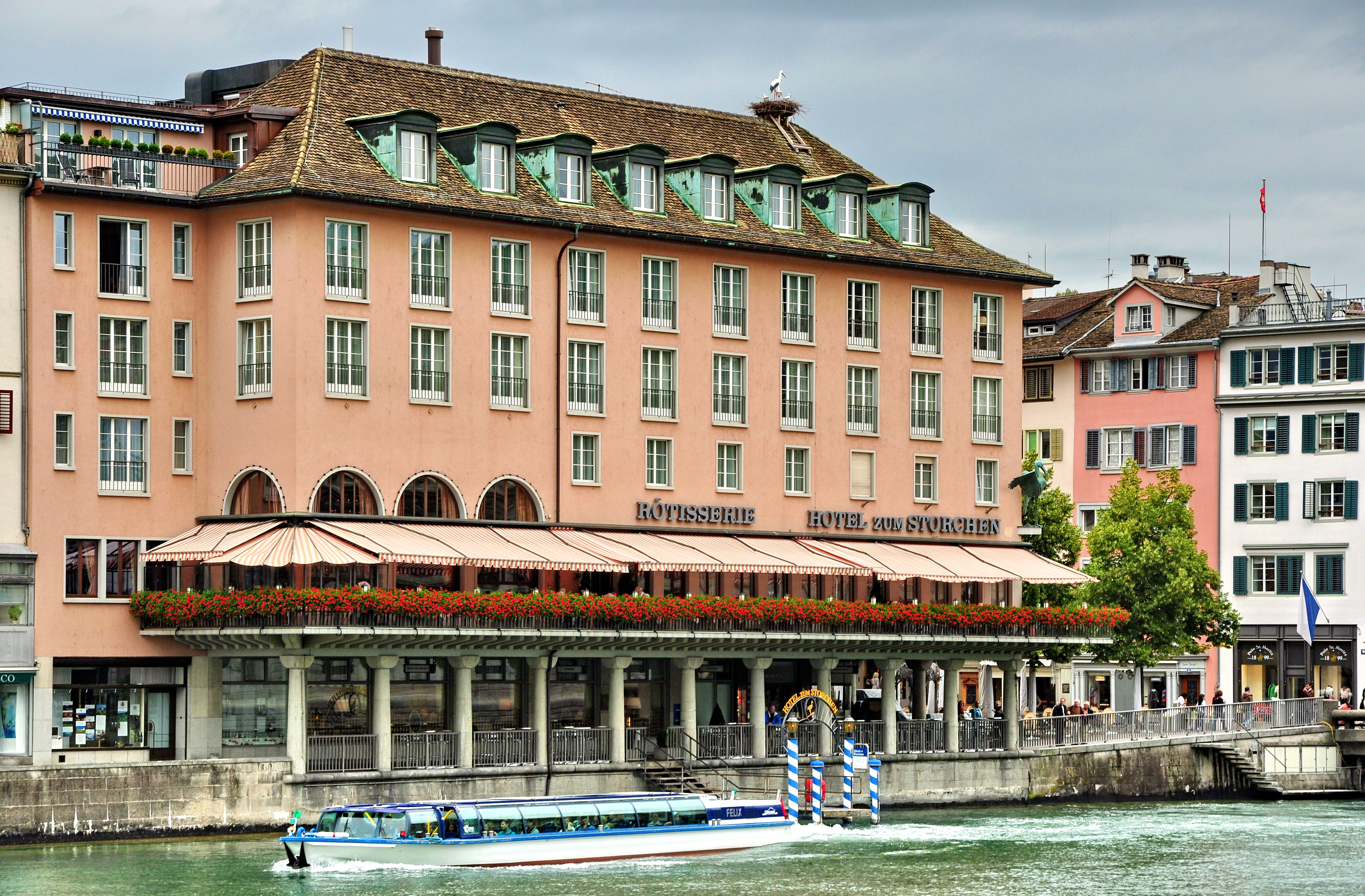
- The name on the building is Hotel zum Storchen
- Industry: Hotel
- Founded: 1357 (669 years ago)
- Headquarters: Weinplatz 2, Zurich, Switzerland
- Key people: Raphael Pedroncelli (Managing Director Operations)
- Website: www.storchen.ch/en/home/

Hotel Storchen, in Zurich, is one of the oldest hotels in Switzerland, dating to 1357. It is first written about using the name "Haus zum Storchen" in the city tax archives. Its name in English means Hotel Stork.

The hotel overlook Wühre, which runs south along the river from this point.

== 2017 reconstruction ==
In January 2017, 400 craftsmen were employed working in shifts over six days a week to completely renovate and modernize the hotel in just 6.5 weeks.

== See also ==
- List of hotels in Switzerland
- List of oldest companies
- Tourism in Switzerland
