= Oerlikon-Bührle =

1906–1999 Swiss defence company based in Oerlikon, Zurich, now restructured

- Type: Armaments
- Predecessor: Werkzeugmaschinenfabrik Oerlikon
- Founded: 1906
- Defunct: 1999
- Fate: Merged into OC Oerlikon in January 2000
- Successor: OC Oerlikon
- Headquarters: Oerlikon, Zürich, Switzerland
- Key people: Emil Georg Bührle
- Products: 20-mm Oerlikon gun

Oerlikon-Bührle (full name Werkzeugmaschinenfabrik Oerlikon, Bührle & Co., initially Werkzeugmaschinenfabrik Oerlikon) was a Swiss armaments company based in Oerlikon (Zürich) from 1906 to 1999.

After restructurings and the sale of various core divisions, in particular the armaments division Oerlikon Contraves Defence to the German Rheinmetall DeTec, the holding company was merged into the present OC Oerlikon in January 2000.

== History ==
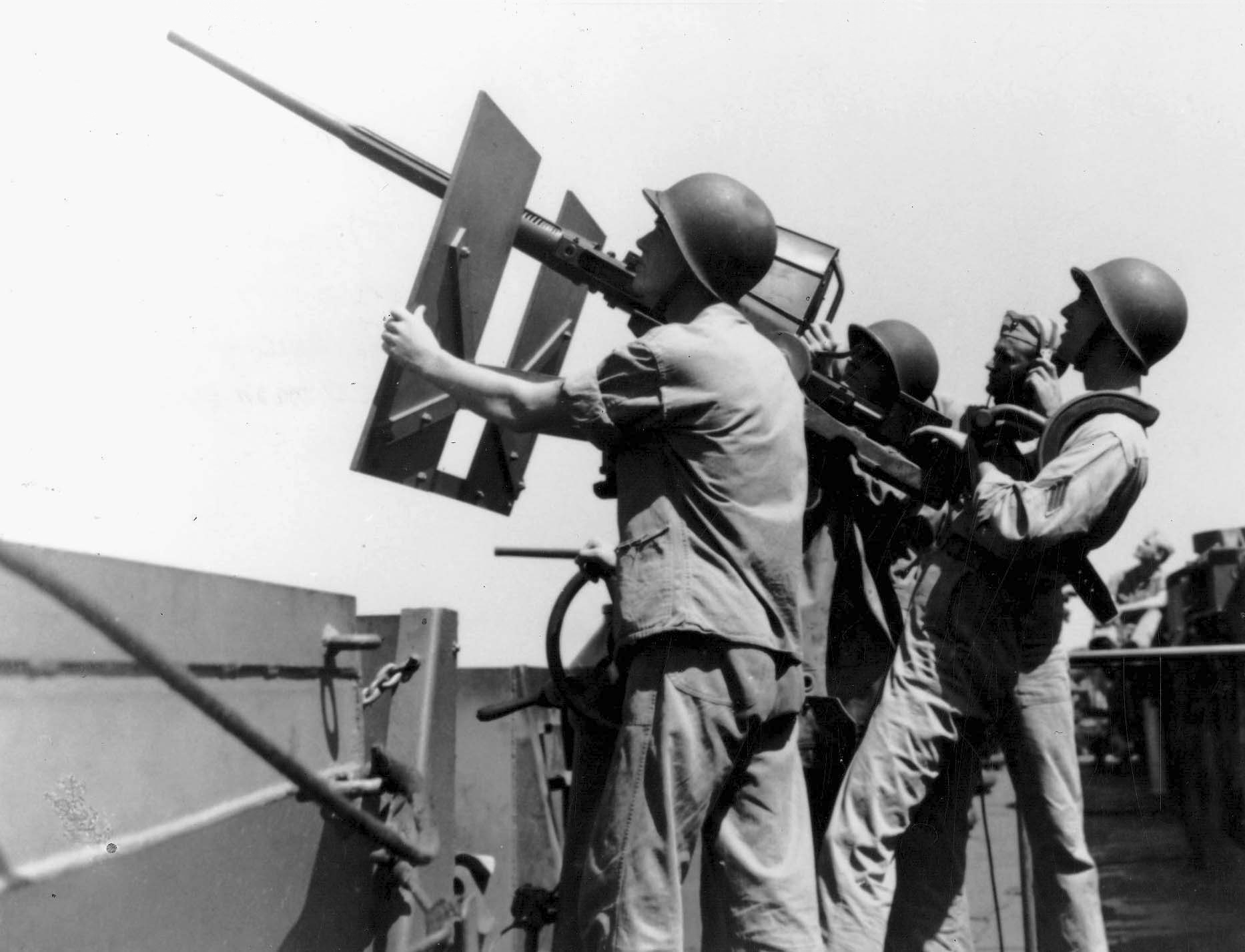
20-mm-Oerlikon anti-aircraft gun in use by the US Navy on USS Enterprise (CV-6) (May 1943)

Founded in 1906, the Schweizerische Werkzeugmaschinenfabrik Oerlikon (SWO), a spin-off of the Maschinenfabrik Oerlikon, had been taken over by the Magdeburger Werkzeugmaschinenfabrik in 1923, thus saving it from bankruptcy. The German Emil Georg Bührle, transferred from Magdeburg to Oerlikon as an authorised signatory in 1924, expanded weapons manufacturing into the company's main business with the 20-mm Oerlikon gun in the economically difficult 1920s and became the main shareholder of the Werkzeugmaschinenfabrik Oerlikon (WO) in 1929. The Oerlikon gun, initially also offered as an anti-tank gun, became an export hit, especially as an aircraft on-board weapon and light anti-aircraft gun. It was exported almost all over the world even before the war. In the context of the rearmament of the 1930s, Bührle continued to push the weapons sector and made his company the leading Swiss armaments company.

=== 1920s ===
The main sales countries in the fiercely contested market dominated by the armaments industries of France, Great Britain and the US with world market shares of between 77 percent (1924) and 65 percent (1929) were initially mainly non-European non-industrialised countries that had no armaments industry of their own. France and England imported practically no armaments in the 1920s; only the industrialised countries Japan, the Netherlands and the USA had larger import shares of between 2.5 and 5 per cent of world imports. It was not until around the mid-1930s that the large markets of the future opponents of the German Reich were opened up for imports in the wake of the general rearmament.

In the 1920s and 1930s, WO's war material business was in line with Swiss foreign and security policy. This policy relied on an exportable Swiss armaments industry as a basis for supplying its own army and also promoted the successful armaments sector for reasons of job creation. Until 1938, there were basically neither domestic nor international legal restrictions on the business of the Swiss armaments industry and thus on the WO.

=== 1930s ===
The export ban during the Spanish Civil War, which broke out in 1936, was circumvented by exporting via Mexico. Reports were published in the media about deliveries of Oerlikon weapons to Republican Spain. To Abyssinia, the WO supplied machine guns in 1935 until shortly before the arms export ban came into force. Later, too, weapons were allegedly smuggled by E. G. Bührle's WO into the country attacked by Italy. In Switzerland, Bührle represented Abyssinia as Consul General.

The company achieved its breakthrough in 1929 with a large order for over 100 cannons in China. In Europe, where market access with the major powers remained difficult until the forced rearmament in the wake of the Anschluss von Österreich and the Sudeten Crisis, the company mainly supplied smaller states such as the Baltic states, Czechoslovakia and Greece. Real large orders and deliveries were made to France, Great Britain and the Netherlands as a result of the massive rearmament in 1938.

From 1936 onwards, business was done with Switzerland. In France, Germany, Italy, Japan and England there were attempts at cooperation (1932/33 with Hispano-Suiza, France), cooperation (1932/33 with Scotti, Italy), licensing (1936 to Germany and Japan, 1939 to the UK) and company investments (1934 to 1939 in the Ikaria Gesellschaft für Flugzeugzubehör mbH in Berlin; manufacturer of the 20 mm machine gun MG FF). In the 1930s, the company rose to become the largest private arms manufacturer in Switzerland, employing over 2,000 people in 1939. From the end of the decade WO held an important position in the Swiss economy as an employer of subcontractors.

In 1939, Bührle and partners founded Pilatus-Flugzeugwerke (Pilatus Aircraft) in Stans. Emil G. Bührle's diversification strategy was to reduce risk by investing in the civil sector on the one hand and in building up the Pilatus Aircraft Works on the other. The Pilatus factories did not achieve any significant production during the war as a result of the difficult general conditions. Until the Capitulation of France in June 1940, the main customers of WO were the Allied countries - led by Great Britain and France. These countries placed orders in Oerlikon for almost 250 million Swiss francs. For their fulfilment, even urgent needs of the Swiss Army for 20 mm Oerlikon guns had to be postponed out of consideration for the policy of the Federal Council.

After Bührle became Swiss in 1937, the German authorities, as part of their autarky policy, deliberately ousted him from his participation in the Berlin Ikaria-Gesellschaft until 1939. At the outbreak of war, both Italy and Germany had already had their own efficient producers of 20 mm guns for years (Mauser, Rheinmetall, Breda). It was not until the summer of 1940 that WO also supplied 20-mm guns to the Axis powers in accordance with Federal Council policy and under pressure from the Swiss trade delegation. Researchers agree that the Swiss government's request to E. G. Bührle to supply Germany - later denied by Federal Councillor Kobelt - was a violation of the Neutrality Law. After the conquest of France and complete fascist encirclement, Switzerland had been put under pressure by Nazi Germany to deliver all war material produced for foreign countries to the Axis powers. From WO's point of view, these partly entered into the supply contracts with England and France, which could no longer be fulfilled, in the deals that were now starting.

==== Supplies to the Axis Powers ====
In Second World War, the 20-mm Oerlikon gun was the main export product to the Axis powers. WO's business with the Axis countries - Germany, Italy and Romania - reached a total of 543.4 million Swiss francs in the years 1940 to 1944 (adjusted for inflation today, about 2 billion Fr. ) and comprised the delivery of 7,013 20-mm guns, 14,758,489 rounds of ammunition, 12,520 spare barrels and 40,092 magazines. What was ordered and produced in 1943 and 1944, however, was partly not delivered due to the development of the authorisation practice and the war situation. What was delivered, meanwhile, was described by the German Auswärtiges Amt as "key deliveries".

From 1944 onwards, the WO found itself in a difficult position as a result of blacklists by the Allies and as a result of open claims from incomplete contracts (Germany, Italy) against all former warring parties. In the catastrophic situation for WO and its employees caused by the arms export ban since autumn 1944, it was Emil G. Bührle personally who kept WO and its staff afloat for around five years with the help of his personal fortune.

=== Post-war period ===
In 1946, the Gerätebauanstalt was founded in Balzers. The company specialised in the production of thin films and thus founded the core technology of today's OC Oerlikon, which was temporarily also called Unaxis. Oerlikon-Contraves developed the SNORA and SURA-D rockets, RSA guided missile, the RSC/D guided missile system, the RSE Kriens guided missile and the Zenit sounding rocket. In the field of anti-tank guided weapons, the Oerlikon-Contraves Mosquito was developed. In 1957, business development in the direction of vacuum technology and a first production plant for process systems in Trübbach followed.

Oerlikon-Contraves had been active in space since 1964; the company was involved in the development of the European satellite ESRO-1. The Zenit sounding rocket, first launched in 1967, was also a product of its involvement in space. In 1973, Oerlikon-Bührle Holding AG was created and listed on the Swiss Stock Exchange. Three years later, the group integrated Balzers AG.

=== "Bührle affair" of the 1960s ===
Between 1963 and 1968, the group violated the Federal Council's export bans on war material by supplying weapons to the countries involved in conflicts: Nigeria, South Africa, Malaysia, Israel, Saudi Arabia, Egypt and Lebanon. Oerlikon-Bührle obtained the necessary export licences by submitting applications indicating false countries of destination. This practice became public in 1968 after media reported on Oerlikon cannons in the Nigerian civil war.

In 1970, Dieter Bührle and three co-defendants were sentenced to conditional prison terms of between 8 and 18 months and a fine of 200,000 Swiss francs. The damage to the group remained minor, however, because although the Federal Council withdrew Bührle's war material production licence, it reassigned it to the Oerlikon-Bührle Group.

In the course of the affair resulting from the media reports, Federal President Willy Spühler had to admit that the authorities had had information about illegal arms exports for months. As a political consequence, a popular initiative to ban the export of war material was submitted in 1969, which was narrowly rejected in 1972 with 49.8% of the votes in favour, but also with a clear Ständemehr.

As an indirect counter-proposal, more restrictive arms export legislation came into force in 1973.

=== After the end of the Cold War ===
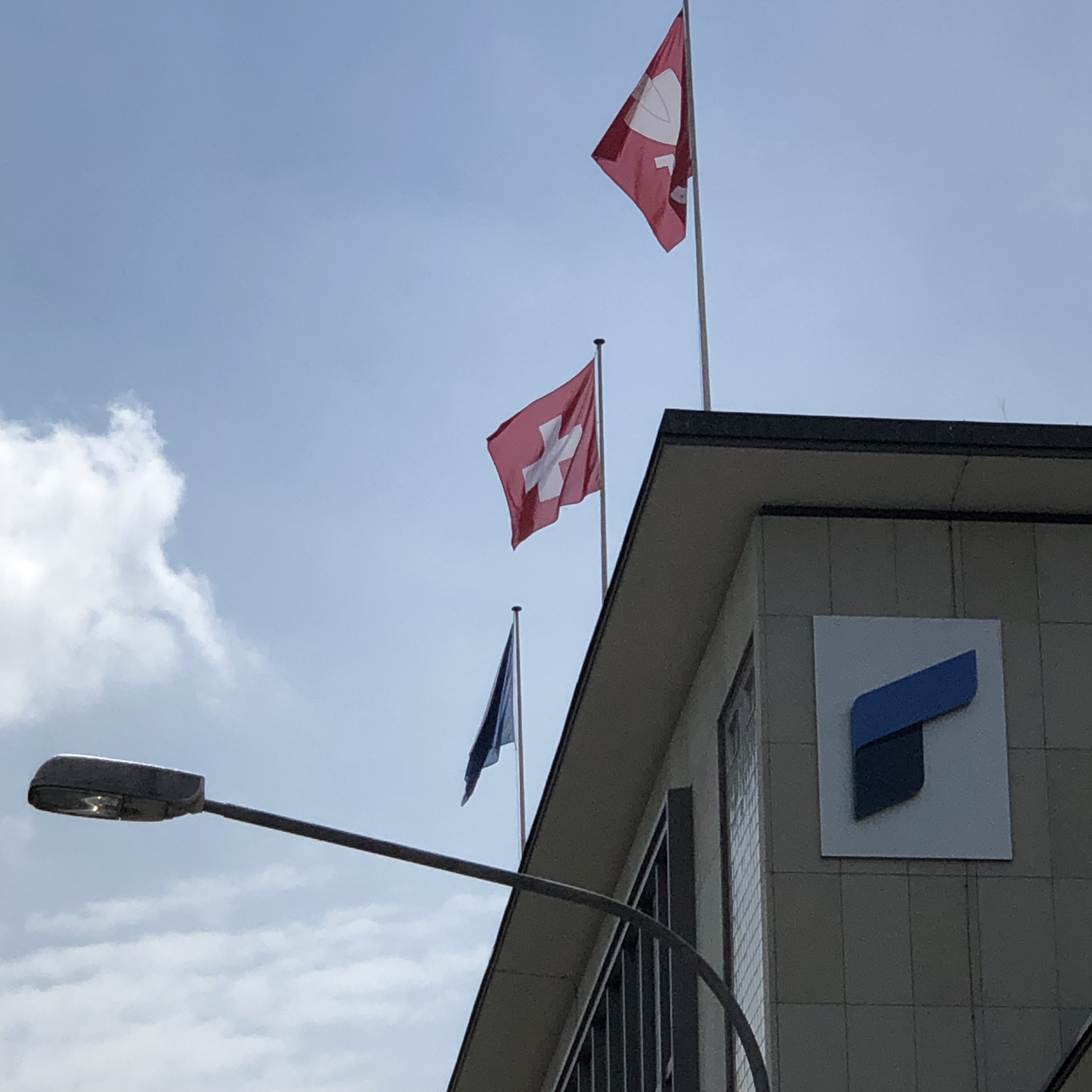
Rheinmetall Air Defence in Oerlikon (2022)

In 1980, the Oerlikon-Bührle Group employed around 37,000 people, the highest number in the group's history. In 1991, failures in ADATS and the end of the Cold War forced the decision to focus on technology, consumer goods and customer service. In 1994, Oerlikon-Bührle acquired the Leybold Group, which was active in vacuum technology, and merged it with Balzers to form Balzers & Leybold, the leading thin-film technology company.

In 1999, the group focused on selected technology sectors and sold the defence division Oerlikon Contraves Defence to the German Rheinmetall DeTec - today Rheinmetall Air Defence AG - and the shoe manufacturer Bally to the US Texas Pacific Group. The space division became legally independent as Contraves Space. Oerlikon-Bührle Immobilien AG was sold to Allreal Holding and has since traded as Allreal Generalunternehmung AG. In January 2000, the Oerlikon-Bührle group was renamed Unaxis, and in September 2006 it was renamed again to OC Oerlikon AG. At the same time, Contraves Space was renamed Oerlikon Space. In 2009, RUAG acquired Oerlikon Space and made it RUAG Space.

== Shareholdings ==
- Bally
- Gerätebauanstalt Balzers
- Contraves
- Ikaria Gesellschaft für Flugzeugzubehör mbH, Berlin
- Franz Brozincevic Wetzikon
- Pilatus-Flugzeugwerke, Stans

== See also ==
- Switzerland in World War II

== Bibliography ==
- Daniel Heller: Between Entrepreneurship, Politics and Survival. Emil G. Bührle and the Machine Tool Factory Oerlikon, Bührle & Co. 1924-1945. Verlag Huber, Frauenfeld 2002, ISBN 3-7193-1277-1.
- Peter Hug: Schweizer Rüstungsindustrie und Kriegsmaterialhandel zur Zeit des Nationalsozialismus. Corporate Strategies - Market Development - Political Surveillance. Chronos, Zurich 2002 (= Publications of the TOB, vol. 11). ISBN 3-0340-0611-X. - Independent Commission of Experts (TOB) Switzerland - Second World War.
- Christian Koller: 75 years ago: A wildcat strike at Bührle, in: Sozialarchiv Info 1 (2016). chapters 4-10.
