= RSE Kriens =

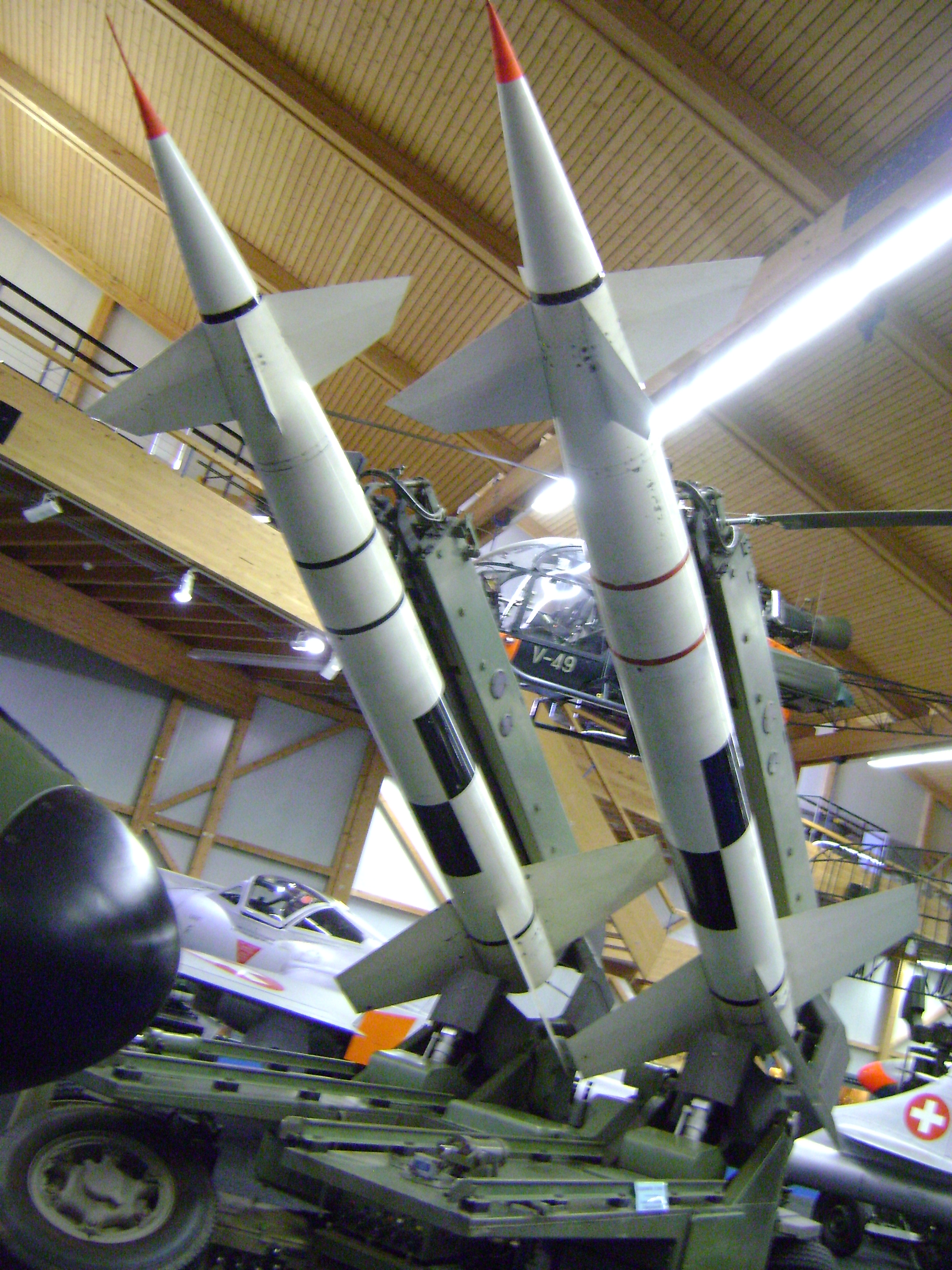
- Kriens RSe Missile on a duplex launcher at the Flieger-Flab-Museum
- Type: Surface-to-air missile
- Place of origin: Switzerland

Production history
- Designed: 1959
- Manufacturer: Oerlikon Contraves
- Produced: 1958–1966

Specifications
- Mass: missile: 800 kg (empty 360 kg)
- Length: 5.4 m (17 ft 9 in)
- Diameter: 42 cm (1 ft 5 in)
- Wingspan: 2.0 m (6 ft 7 in)
- Warhead: 70 kg warhead
- Engine: Solid fuel rocket motor
- Operational range: 35 km (22 mi)
- Flight ceiling: 27,000 m (89,000 ft)
- Maximum speed: Mach 2.9
- Guidance system: Beam-riding
- Steering system: control surfaces
- Launch platform: vehicle or trailer

RSE Kriens was a Swiss-developed surface-to-air missile. It never entered service. It was named Kriens after Kriens, a village located in the canton of Lucerne.

== Design and development ==
From 1959 to 1966, Contraves, along with many other Swiss companies, developed the Kriens, while drawing on the experience of the guided missile system RSC / D, RSD 58. The missile project was funded by both private Swiss companies, as well as the federal government, and was developed up to production-ready stage. The first flight was on 23 March 1964.

The missile's modular system used advanced technology for the ground equipment and the missiles, and the whole system could be interconnected to a multi-part cluster, which included several radars and missile launchers. However, after introduction of the British Bristol Bloodhound as the BL-64 the project was cancelled by the EMD, and the missile was never mass-produced, neither for Switzerland nor for another nation. For export, the system was given the name 'Micon'.

A launcher with two missiles is held at the Flieger-Flab-Museum.

The fire unit consisted of a measuring radar, 1-3 radio collars, 4 launchers, command car, trolley and several units (generators). The trolley, command car, tracking device and aggregates were individually housed on single-axle trailers, the measuring radar and missile launchers on each two-axle trailers.

- Rowing span: 1.5 m
- Thrust / burning time: t = 6.5 for 9 seconds then 1.8 t for 16 seconds
- Burnout velocity: 900 m / s
- Generator on-board supply of hydraulic and electronic: 20 kW

Contraves built the research rocket Zenit-C using their experience and expertise from designing the Kriens.
