= Emil Georg Bührle =

German-born Swiss industrialist, armaments manufacturer and art collector

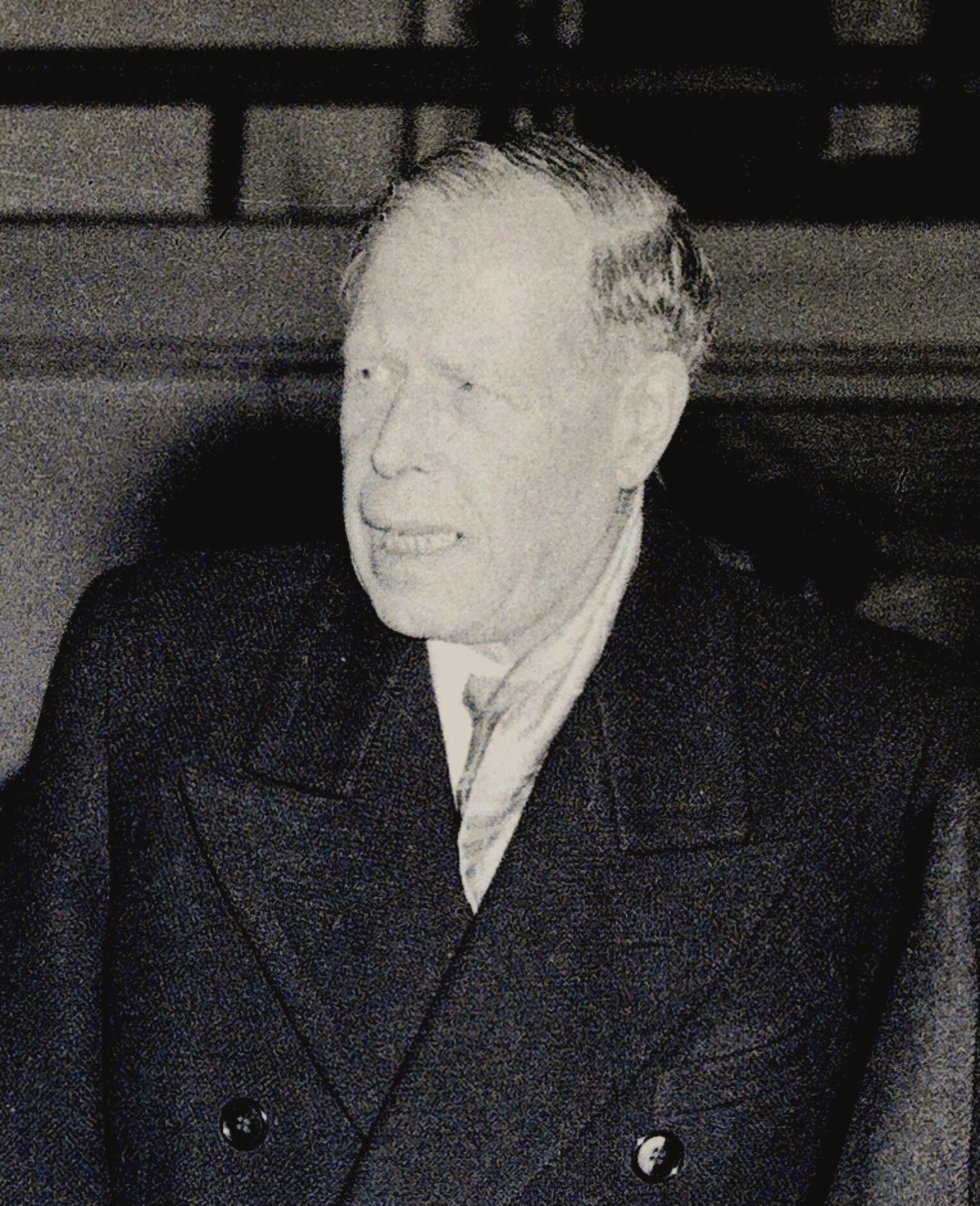
- Bührle (1955)
- Born: Emil Georg Bührle; 31 August 1890; Pforzheim, Grand Duchy of Baden, German Empire
- Died: 26 November 1956 (aged 66); University Hospital, Zürich, Zürich, Switzerland
- Citizenship: Swiss (since 1937)
- Education: University of Freiburg
- Occupations: Industrialist; armaments manufacturer; art collector
- Known for: Owning and leading Oerlikon-Bührle and founding Foundation E. G. Bührle
- Spouse: Wilhelmine Charlotte Schalk (m. 1920)
- Children: Dieter; Hortense
- Website: buehrle.ch

Emil Georg Bührle (German pronunciation: [ˈeːmɪl ɡeˈɔʁk ˈbyːʁlə]; 31 August 1890 - 26 November 1956) was a German-born Swiss industrialist, armament manufacturer and art collector. Bührle was long-term managing owner of Oerlikon-Bührle and the founding patron of Foundation E.G. Bührle. By the end of World War II, Bührle had become Switzerland's richest man after having been told by the Swiss authorities to not only supply weapons to the Allies but also to Nazi Germany. He was the patriarch of the Bührle family.

== Early life and education ==
Bührle was born 31 August 1890 in Pforzheim, Grand Duchy of Baden (presently Germany) to Joseph Bührle, who was a shoemaker turned municipal tax collector, and Rosa Bührle (née Benz). He had an older sister, Mina Bührle (née Bührle; born 1889), who lived modestly in Kappel, Rhineland-Palatinate where the family is originally from. His younger brother, Wilhelm Bührle (born 1897) became a dentist and lived in Pforzheim, where the family has relocated to in 1902.

He was raised in the Old Christ Catholic faith. In 1909, Bührle completed his Abitur, and studied at University of Freiburg majoring in Art History and Literature before moving to Munich.

== Career ==
Bührle initially served in the Imperial German Army as cavalry officer during World War I from 1914 to 1919. In 1919 he joined the Magdeburg Machine and Tool Factory (Magdeburg Werkzeugmaschinenfabrik), today EMCO Magdeburg GmbH and after becoming an associate became legal representative.

The Magdeburger Werkzeugmaschinenfabrik bought the Swiss Machine Tool Factory Oerlikon (Werkzeugmaschinenfabrik Oerlikon) in 1923, and Bührle became the general director the following year. In 1924, he moved to Zurich. In 1929, Bührle became the majority shareholder of the Werkzeugmaschinenfabrik Oerlikon and in 1936 he became the sole owner of the company (later the Oerlikon-Bührle Holding AG). In 1937, Bührle obtained Swiss citizenship.

Emil Bührle (with cane) accompanies Haile Selassie at Oerlikon-Bührle (1954)

Bührle's role as an industrialist has been controversial in recent decades due to his ties to Nazis. Although he converted the almost bankrupt Werkzeugmaschinenfabrik Oerlikon into a thriving company, his main business became arms production and export. Before the second world war the Oerlikon-Bührle company supplied the Republicans in Spain (i.e. Franco opponents), the independent Abyssinia (in the colonial war against fascist Italy), and several Baltic countries, Czechoslovakia, Greece, China, Turkey, France, Netherlands and United Kingdom. In the period from 1940 to 1944, with Switzerland then completely surrounded by fascist countries (Italy, Germany) and fascist-occupied countries (Austria, France), and at the request of the Swiss government, the company supplied weapons to Germany and Italy. In the post-war years, Emil Bührle and the Oerlikon-Bührle company were involved in illegal weapons deals on a large-scale, smuggling arms to Hyderabad, Pakistan, and other countries.

The following foundations are attributed to Emil Bührle: Emil Bührle Foundation for the Swiss literature (1943), Goethe Foundation for Art and Science (1944) and the Foundation of the cultivation of the Kunsthaus Zürich (1954).

== E. G. Bührle Foundation (Art Collection) ==
Bührle's first acquisitions were two 1920 watercolours by Erich Heckel, followed in 1924 by a picture of Maurice de Vlaminck. The present day make up of the Bührle collection started in 1936, when financial conditions were very favourable.

=== Nazi-era acquisitions ===
The American Office of Strategic Services Art Looting Investigation Unit Reports 1945-46, state that during the Nazi era, Bührle was an "important recipient of looted works of art by purchase from Fischer and Wendland".

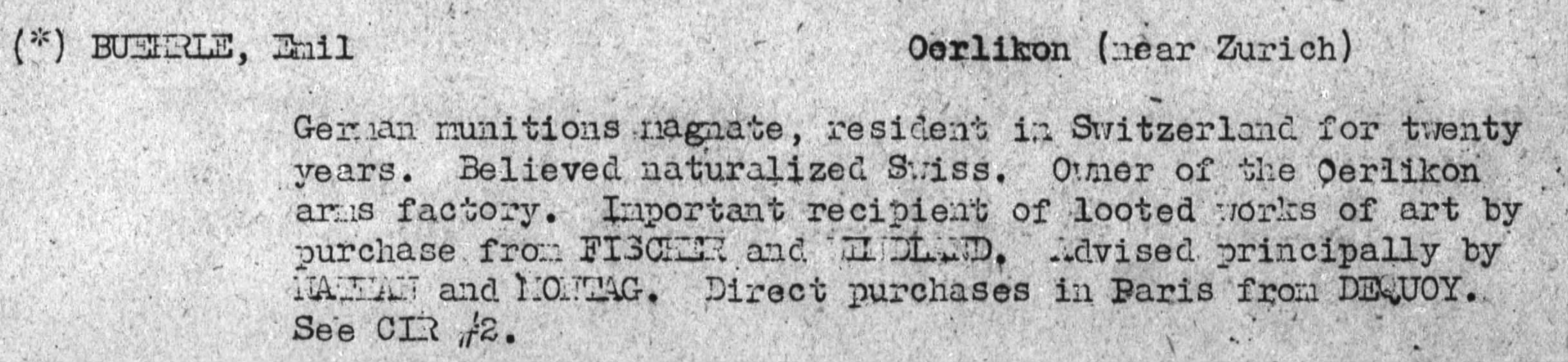

Between 1940 and 1944 Emil Georg Bührle's arms dealing increased his fortune from 140,000 to 127,000,000 Swiss Francs (roughly $6 billion in 2015 U.S. dollars), which he used for art-buying sprees in Nazi-occupied Paris, forming the core of his collection. Bührle bought many artworks through the dealers Siegfried Rosengart, Fritz Nathan and Toni Aktuaryus as well as other dealers.

=== Post-war ===
After World War II, Bührle continued to be advised by Fritz Nathan, a gallery owner, and a small circle of international dealers in Paris, London and New York City, in addition to which included Georges Wildenstein, Paul Rosenberg, Max Kaganovitch, and Frank Lloyd of the Marlborough Gallery.

The collection includes medieval sculptures and old masters, mainly French Impressionism and classical modernism, including masterpieces by Paul Cézanne (The Boy in the Red Vest), Pierre-Auguste Renoir (La petite Irène) and Vincent van Gogh (The Sower (after Millet)).

Bührle continued the tradition of collectors in Germany, Scandinavia, Britain and the US, who—before the First World War and in the inter-war years—centred their interest on French modernism. An example of this trend in Switzerland is the "Am Römerholz" collection by Oskar Reinhart in nearby Winterthur. Two-thirds of the collection now displayed were acquired in 1960 by the heirs to the E.G. Bührle Foundation, and later put on display. The other family-owned works of art were often shown in exhibitions. An exhibition featuring several works of the collection in 1990 in Washington, D.C., led to protests and discussions in the media due to Bührle's role as a weapons exporter in the Second World War and the sometimes unclear origin of the pictures, some of which were formerly Jewish-owned. Following the findings of an "Independent Commission of Swiss Second World War Experts", Bührle had to return 13 paintings of French-Jewish origin to their former owners or their second-generation descendants.

In 2021 an extension to the Kunsthaus in Zürich, Switzerland's largest art museum, opened, with almost an entire floor dedicated to paintings and sculptures on 20-year loan from the Bührle Foundation. This drew criticism due to Bührle's Nazi-era weapons dealings, and his use of forced labour and child labour in his factories at the time. Up to 90 of the works loaned to the Kunsthaus are thought possibly to have been acquired illegitimately from Jews; historian Erich Keller said "We need independent research into the art's provenances, and then consider which of these paintings really belong in the Kunsthaus and which need to be given back." The Bührle Foundation's director responded that "The approximately 90 works are works for which no complete provenance is known, but for which there is also no reason to assume a problematic provenance".

== Personal life ==
In 1920, Bührle married Charlotte Schalk, who was from a prominent Magdeburg banking family. His father in-law was banker Ernst Schalk, who acted as key person in his career of acquiring Oerlikon. Through his affiliation with the Schalk family he was able to use their family wealth to take-over the company. The couple had two children;

- Ernst Joseph Sylvester Dietrich, known as Dieter Bührle (December 31, 1921 - November 9, 2012), who had one son and one daughter
- Isabella Katharina Alix Hortense, known as Hortense Anda-Bührle (May 18, 1926 - May 16, 2014), who was married to Géza Anda, and had one son Gratian Anda

The family resided at today's location of Foundation E. G. Bührle in Zürich-Riesbach. In 1937, the Bührle family was naturalized as Swiss citizens, in the city of Zurich.

== Death ==
Bührle died November 26, 1956, aged 66 at University Hospital of Zürich from heart failure. He was buried in Rüschlikon.

== Literature ==
- Provenance research by the Emil Bührle Collection, Zurich, 2002–2021 Christen, Ruedi: Die Bührle-Saga. Zürich 1981 ISBN 3-85791-033-X
- Esther Tisa Francini, Anja Heuss, Georg Kreis: Fluchtgut – Raubgut. Der Transfer von Kulturgütern in und über die Schweiz 1933–1945 und die Frage der Restitution. Zürich 2001 ISBN 3-0340-0601-2
- Gloor, Lukas: Stiftung Sammlung E. G. Bührle: Katalog I–III. Silvana 2004–2005, ISBN 88-87582-95-5 (1), ISBN 88-87582-88-2 (2), ISBN 88-87582-73-4 (3).
- Gloor, Lukas: Bührle collection : Impressionist masterpieces from the E.G.Buehrle collection, Zurich (Switzerland). Tokyo: The National Art Center (2018). OCLC 1089128887.
- Heller, Daniel: Zwischen Unternehmertum, Politik und Überleben. Emil G. Bührle und die Werkzeugmaschinenfabrik Oerlikon, Bührle & Co. 1924–1945. Frauenfeld, Stuttgart & Wien 2002 ISBN 3-7193-1277-1
- Hug, Peter: Schweizer Rüstungsindustrie und Kriegsmaterialhandel zur Zeit des Nationalsozialismus: Unternehmensstrategien – Marktentwicklung – politische Überwachung. Zürich 2002 ISBN 3-0340-0611-X
- Katalog Washington D.C.: The Passionate Eye, Impressionist and other Master Paintings from the E. G. Bührle Collection. Zürich 1990 ISBN 0-8478-1215-4
- Emil Maurer: Stiftung Sammlung E. G. Bührle, Zürich. Bern 1992 ISBN 3-85782-526-X
