= C-RAM =

Military air defense system

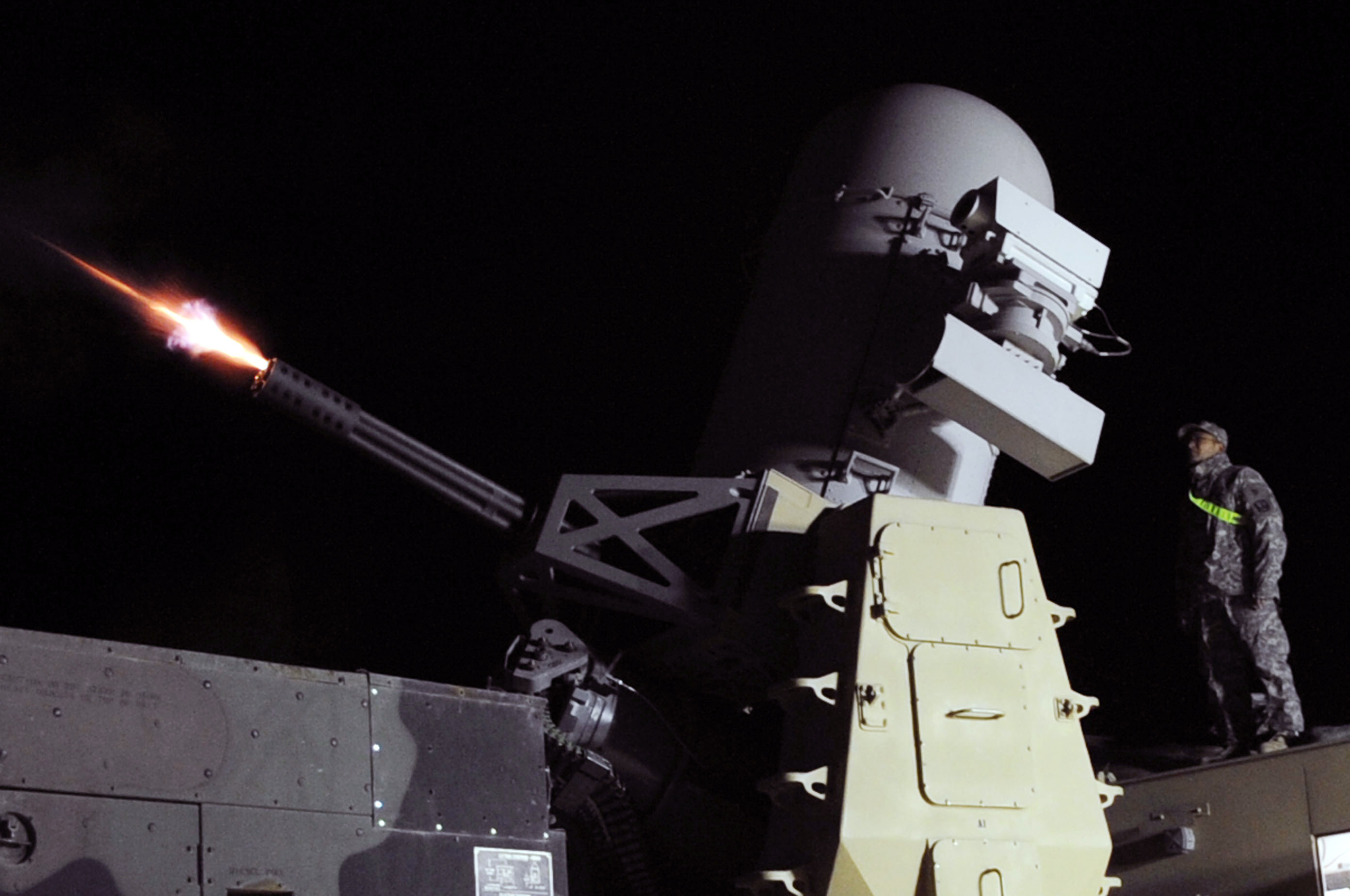
2010 test-fire of the Centurion C-RAM. Balad, Iraq

Counter rocket, artillery, and mortar, abbreviated C-RAM or counter-RAM, is a set of systems used to detect and/or destroy incoming rockets, artillery, mortars and drones before they hit their targets, or provide early warning.

== Types ==
=== United States (dedicated C-RAM) ===
==== Land Phalanx Weapon System ====
A video of a US test fire

The 20 mm Land-Based Phalanx Weapon System (also called Centurion C-RAM) is a land-based variant of the U.S. Navy's Phalanx close-in weapon system, a radar-controlled rapid-fire gun for close-in protection of vessels from missiles. Both use a forward-looking infrared (FLIR) camera to allow their operators to visually identify incoming fire before opening fire. But while naval Phalanx systems fire tungsten armor-piercing rounds, the C-RAM uses the 20 mm HEIT-SD (high-explosive incendiary tracer, self-destruct) ammunition, originally developed for the M163 Vulcan Air Defense System. These rounds explode on impact with the target, or on tracer burnout, thereby greatly reducing the risk of collateral damage from rounds that fail to hit their target.

=== United States (C-RAM integration) ===
==== Accelerated Improved Interceptor Initiative (AI3) ====
In February 2012, Raytheon was awarded a contract to develop the AI3, a modified AIM-9 Sidewinder missile mounted on the Avenger launcher, to perform counter rocket, artillery, mortar (C-RAM), counter unmanned aerial vehicle (C-UAV), and counter cruise missile duties.

In August 2014, the system successfully intercepted a UAV and cruise missile target featuring a semi-active radar homing seeker in a test.

==== Multi-Mission Launcher ====
The MML has its roots in the Indirect Fire Protection Capability (IFPC) Increment 2-Intercept program which also included the development of the Miniature Hit-to-Kill Missile (MHTK). The system is intended to close gaps in the Army's cruise missile, short range air defense (SHORAD) and Counter Rocket, Artillery, and Mortar (C-RAM) defenses.

===== IFPC Inc 2-I: Weapon System =====
IFPC Inc 2-I is a mobile ground based multi-role weapons system built around the Integrated Air and Missile Defense Battle Command System with an AN/MPQ-64 Sentinel acting as the prime sensor and truck mounted MML systems as shooters. The acronym IFPC is pronounced "if pick." The Army intends to integrate a 100-kilowatt laser weapon with the system, they awarded a $130m development contract to a joint Dynetics and Lockheed Martin team. Like the MML the system will be integrated with the FMTV. The Army intends to test a full (including laser) IFPC system in 2022. In 2019 the Army announced their intent to field a high powered microwave weapon as part of IFPC by 2024 with a demonstration in 2022.

===== IFPC Inc 2-I: FMTV mounted Multi-Mission Launcher =====
The MML was planned to be fielded carried aboard a Family of Medium Tactical Vehicles truck; each FMTV carries fifteen MML tubes organized into three five-tube clips. The launcher is highly maneuverable with 360 degrees of rotation and a full 90 degrees of elevation. Each FMTV pulls a standard trailer with a tactical missile data link and a standard 60 kW generator. Development of the platform utilized components from the M1157 Dump Truck and M142 High Mobility Artillery Rocket System.

==== Enduring Shield ====
Enduring Shield from Dynetics uses a launcher based on the MML. The stacking system was redesigned to cost less and gains in probability and reducing complexity were also made. Like the MML the Enduring Shield launcher is payload agnostic allowing a wide range of missiles to be integrated into the system. Dynetics' MML-based Enduring Shield design was selected by the U.S. Army over the Rafael Iron Dome in August 2021. A typical Enduring Shield platoon will consist of four launchers linked to one AN/MPQ-64 Sentinel radar via the Army's Integrated Battle Command System (IBCS) network; each launcher carries 15 AIM-9X Sidewinder missiles and is deployed off the back of Palletized Load System or Load Handling System trucks.

=== Israel: Iron Dome (C-RAM integration) ===
Iron Dome is an Israeli missile system featuring multiple-target tracking and self-guided missile interceptors. Due to the ongoing increase of its engagement range and new missile and interception improvements, plus surface-to-air missile capability, it has developed into a fully-fledged air defense system. By November 2012, the system had intercepted over 400 rockets fired into Israel by Gaza Strip militants. Based on operational success, defense reporter Mark Thompson estimates that Iron Dome is currently the most effective counter-missile system in existence.

=== Germany: Mantis Air Defence System ===
The MANTIS Air Defence System is a 35 mm fully automated C-RAM system, produced by Rheinmetall based on Oerlikon's Skyshield. It has been in use by the Luftwaffe from 2011.

=== Germany: Skynex ===
Skynex is a short-range air defense and C-RAM system produced by Rheinmetall. It integrates Oerlikon Skyshield guns, radar, and control unit on Rheinmetall HX trucks. It has been used by Ukraine since 2023.

=== Italy: Porcupine ===
A typical Porcupine configuration for the Italian Army consists of four firing units, one central control post for target designation and weapon control and a 3D radar system "track while scan type" for surveillance and target tracking. Each remote firing unit consists of a 20 mm M61A1 Gatling cannon, its ammunition handling system and a stabilised optronic infrared (IR) tracking system.

=== Italy: Draco ===
The Draco is a multipurpose weapon station prototype designed for use against air, RAM & surface targets. It was designed for the Italian Army by Oto-Melara using the Centauro 8×8 wheeled armored vehicle chassis. The main armament consists of a 76 mm, 62 caliber gun with an automatic ammunition loading system and a firing rate of 80–100 rounds per minute. The 76 mm gun is electrically controlled for elevation and traversing, and is stabilized in elevation. Draco can be installed on 8×8 wheeled platforms, for combat support operations or convoy defence, as well as on tracked vehicles or on shelters for point defence. The main gun and the automatic loading system are fully compatible with all in service 76 mm rounds and also with 76 mm Dart guided ammunition. Draco can be completely controlled by two Operators (the Commander and the Gunner) from a remote position, located inside the hull for mobile installation or inside a protected command shelter for fixed installation.

=== China: LD-2000 ===
The LD-2000 SPAAGM is a Chinese developed land-based close-in weapon system. LD-2000 is based on the Chinese Navy's Type 730 CIWS. In operation, it pairs with a Counter Battery Radar.

=== Netherlands: Goalkeeper ===
Goalkeeper CIWS is a Dutch close-in weapon system (CIWS) introduced in 1979. It is an autonomous and completely automatic weapon system for short-range defence of ships against highly manoeuvrable missiles, aircraft and fast-manoeuvering surface vessels. Once activated the system automatically undertakes the entire air defence process from surveillance and detection to destruction, including the selection of the next priority target.

=== Norway: NASAMS (capable of C-RAM integration) ===
NASAMS is a short- to medium-range ground-based air defense system developed by Kongsberg Defence & Aerospace (KDA) and RTX Corporation. The system defends against unmanned aerial vehicles (UAVs), helicopters, cruise missiles, unmanned combat aerial vehicles (UCAVs), and fixed wing aircraft, firing any of a wide range of existing missiles.

NASAMS was the first application of a surface-launched AIM-120 AMRAAM (Advanced Medium Range Air-to-Air Missile). NASAMS 2 is an upgraded version of the system capable of using Link 16, which has been operational since 2007. As of 2022, NASAMS 3 is the latest upgrade. Deployed in 2019, it adds capability to fire AIM-9X Sidewinder and AMRAAM-ER missiles and to integrate with C-RAM and C-UAS systems, and introduces mobile air-liftable launchers. NASAMS has proven interoperability with longer range systems such as Patriot.

=== Russia: AK-630 ===
The AK-630 is a Soviet and Russian fully automatic naval close-in weapon system based on a six-barreled 30 mm rotary cannon. It is mounted in an enclosed automatic turret and directed by MR-123 radar and television detection and tracking. The system's primary purpose is defense against anti-ship missiles and other precision guided weapons. However it can also be employed against fixed or rotary wing aircraft, ships and other small craft, coastal targets, and floating mines.

== Directed energy research ==
The United States has been enhancing its directed-energy weapon capabilities aimed at countering threats posed by missiles. A directed-energy weapon is a ranged weapon system that inflicts damage at a target by the emission of highly focused energy, including laser, microwaves and particle beams. The US Army awarded a $29m contract in 2016 to Kratos Defense & Security Solutions for prototyping of such systems.

The U.S. defense contractor Raytheon is developing a laser-based variation where low cost focused lasers will provide increased range and decreased time-to-intercept over the gun. A proof of concept was demonstrated on a 60 mm mortar round in 2006.

Iron Beam is an air defense system in development by Israeli defense contractor Rafael Advanced Defense Systems. Unveiled at the 2014 Singapore Air Show on 11 February, the system is designed to destroy short-range rockets, artillery, and mortars with a range of up to 7 km (4.3 mi), too small for the Iron Dome system to intercept effectively. In addition, the system could also intercept unmanned aerial vehicles. Iron Beam will use a "directed high energy laser beam" to destroy hostile targets with ranges of up to 7 kilometres (4.3 mi). Iron Beam will constitute the fifth element of Israel's integrated air defense system, in addition to Arrow 2, Arrow 3, David's Sling, and Iron Dome. However, Iron Beam is also a stand-alone system.

== Operating units (by country) ==
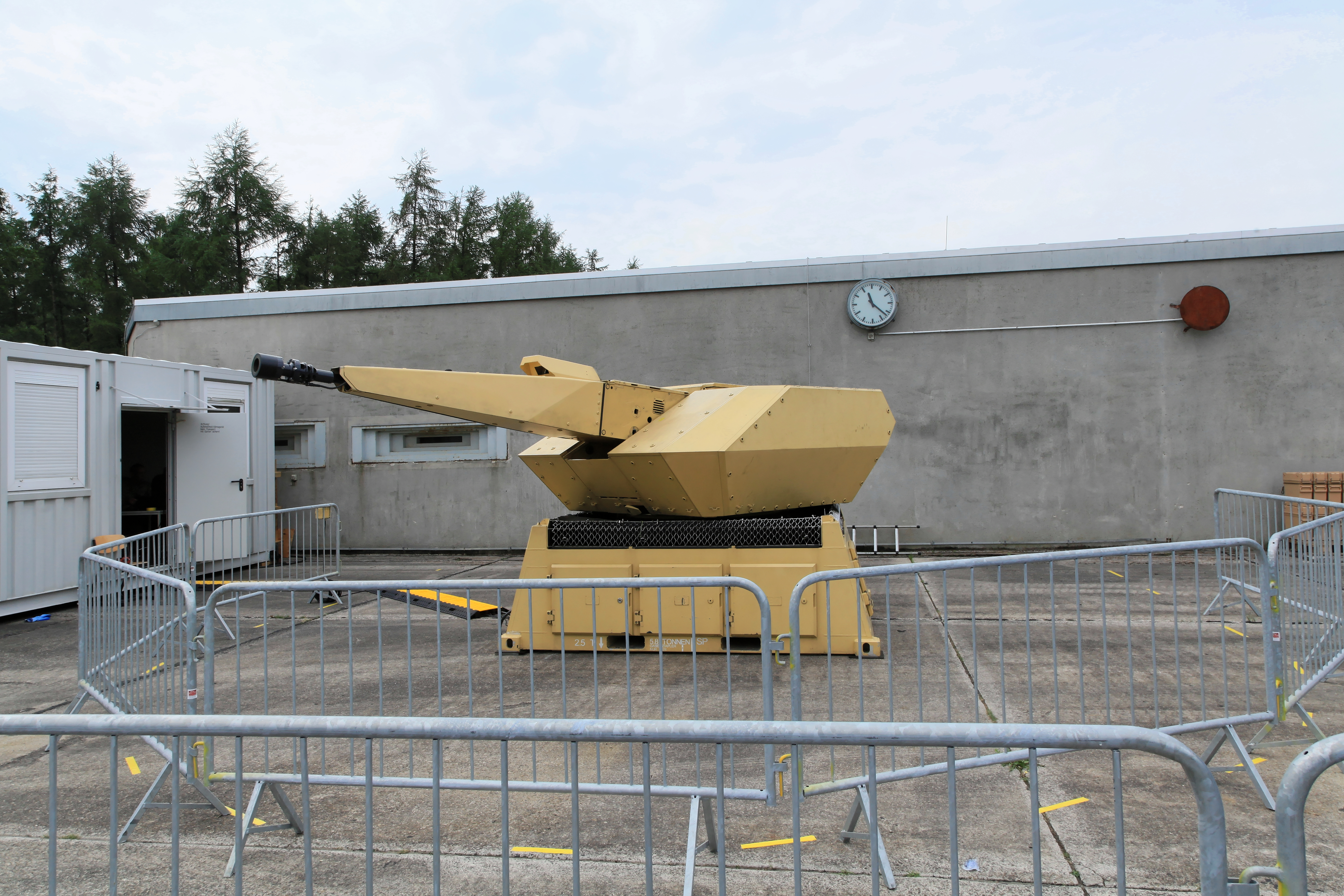
Nächstbereichschutzsystem MANTIS of the Luftwaffe

- Australia: Australian Army
  - 16th Air Land Regiment
- Germany: German Air Force
  - Air Defence Group 61 of Flugabwehrraketengeschwader 1, operating the MANTIS.
- Italy: Italian Army
  - Currently deploying Porcupine batteries and DRACO multipurpose weapon station
- Israel: Israel Defense Forces
  - The Israeli Air Defense Command is currently deploying 10 Iron dome batteries.
- China: People's Liberation Army
  - PLA operates LD-2000 C-RAM for stationary air defense.
- United Kingdom: British Army
  - 16 Regiment Royal Artillery
- United States of America: United States Army
  - 5th Battalion, 5th Air Defense Artillery Regiment (5-5th ADAR), Fort Sill, OK
    - HHB/5-5th ADAR
    - A/5-5th ADAR
    - B/5-5th ADAR
  - 2nd Battalion, 44th Air Defense Artillery Regiment (2-44th ADAR), Fort Campbell, KY
    - A/2-44th ADAR
    - B/2-44th ADAR
    - C/2-44th ADAR
  - TF 1-174th (CRAM), 174th Air Defense Artillery Regiment, Ohio Army National Guard
    - HHB/1-174th
    - A/1-174th
    - B/1-174th
    - C/1-174th
    - D/1-174th
    - B/205th Field Artillery (Radar)
    - US Navy detachment, Phalanx operators

== See also ==
- Counter-battery radar
