= Multi-Mission Launcher =

United States Army missile launching system

- Type: short range air defense (SHORAD), Counter Rocket, Artillery, and Mortar (C-RAM), and Multiple rocket launcher
- Place of origin: United States

Service history
- Used by: United States Army

Production history
- Designer: US Army Aviation and Missile Research, Development, and Engineering Center (AMRDEC)
- Manufacturer: United States Army
- Produced: 2016

Specifications
- Elevation: 90 degrees
- Traverse: 360 degrees
- Effective firing range: <1 nmi (1.9 km) for Stinger, <3 nmi (5.6 km) for Hellfire, <5 nmi (9.3 km) for AIM-9X, <5 nmi (9.3 km) for Tamir

IFPC Inc 2-I launch of an AIM-9X Sidewinder Missile

IFPC Longbow vs MQM-170 Outlaw 25 March 2016

Tamir Firing from IFPC Inc 2-I Multi Mission Launcher

The Multi-Mission Launcher (MML) is an open-systems architecture multi-role missile launching system created by the United States Army's Aviation and Missile Research, Development, and Engineering Center.

== Development ==
The MML has its roots in the Indirect Fire Protection Capability (IFPC) Increment 2-Intercept program which also included the development of the Miniature Hit-to-Kill Missile (MHTK). The system is intended to close gaps in the Army's cruise missile, short range air defense (SHORAD) and Counter Rocket, Artillery, and Mortar (C-RAM) defenses.

The MML was developed by the Aviation and Missile Research, Development, and Engineering Center (AMRDEC). Unusually, AMRDEC served as the prime integrator instead of a private defense contractor; this lowers R&D costs as well as allowing the Army full ownership of the weapon system's source code and intellectual property which significantly lowers sustainment cost. The MML is the first major development program successfully undertaken by the government industrial base in more than 30 years. The Miniature Hit-to-Kill Missile was developed by Lockheed Martin specifically for the MML. Intended to fill the C-RAM role this approximately 2.5 feet (76 cm) and 5 pounds (2.3 kg) missile fits four to a MML pod. Other missiles considered for MML were Expanded Mission Area Missile (EMAM), Israeli Tamir and Stunner missiles, and Accelerated Improved Interceptor missile.

Multiple missiles have been integrated and tested with the system. In 2016 FIM-92 Stinger missiles were launched from a single tube MML at Eglin Air Force Base in Florida. AIM-9X Sidewinder and AGM-114 Hellfire missiles launched from a FMTV mounted 15 tube MML were tested at the Army's White Sands Missile Range in New Mexico. In April 2016, also at White Sands and using the FMTV mounted MML, the Army evaluated the Tamir missile which serves as the interceptor in the Israeli/American Iron Dome System. Raytheon produces a licensed local version of Tamir missile under the name SkyHunter.

By March 2019, the IFPC requirement had been scaled back to focus on cruise missile threats, while C-UAS and C-RAM defense would be handled by other systems; attempting to combine all missions into one system resulted in technical challenges with the payloads and reloading procedures. This allowed the MML to be made larger to accommodate bigger or more missiles. The IFPC will be part of a layered air and missile defense system, with a battery of MMLs attached to each MSHORAD and Patriot missile battalion to handle higher- or lower-end threats. AMRDEC and CMDS will deliver eight MML systems by the end of 2019.

During testing the MML had issues with reloading and the AIM-9X interceptors were prone to overheating.

== Indirect Fire Protection Capability Increment 2-Intercept ==
=== Weapon System ===
Indirect Fire Protection Capability Increment 2-Intercept (IFPC Inc 2-I) is a mobile ground based multi-role weapons system built around the Integrated Air and Missile Defense Battle Command System with an AN/MPQ-64 Sentinel acting as the prime sensor and truck mounted MML systems as shooters. The acronym IFPC is pronounced "if pick." The Army intends to integrate a 100-kilowatt laser weapon with the system, they awarded a $130m development contract to a joint Dynetics and Lockheed Martin team. Like the MML the system will be integrated with the FMTV. The Army intends to test a full (including laser) IFPC system in 2022. In 2019 the Army announced their intent to field a high powered microwave weapon as part of IFPC by 2024 with a demonstration in 2022.

=== FMTV mounted Multi-Mission Launcher ===
The MML was planned to be fielded carried aboard a Family of Medium Tactical Vehicles truck; each FMTV carries fifteen MML tubes organized into three five-tube clips. The launcher is highly maneuverable with 360 degrees of rotation and a full 90 degrees of elevation. Each FMTV pulls a standard trailer with a tactical missile data link and a standard 60 kW generator. Development of the platform utilized components from the M1157 Dump Truck and M142 High Mobility Artillery Rocket System.

== Derivatives ==
=== Enduring Shield ===
Enduring Shield from Dynetics uses a launcher based on the MML. The stacking system was redesigned to cost less and gains in probability and reducing complexity were also made. Like the MML the Enduring Shield launcher is payload agnostic allowing a wide range of missiles to be integrated into the system. Dynetics' MML-based Enduring Shield design was selected by the U.S. Army over the Rafael Iron Dome in August 2021. A typical Enduring Shield platoon will consist of four launchers linked to one AN/MPQ-64 Sentinel radar via the Army's Integrated Battle Command System (IBCS) network; each launcher carries 15 AIM-9X Sidewinder missiles and is deployed off the back of Palletized Load System or Load Handling System trucks.

== See also ==
- ADATS – (Switzerland)
- Antelope air defence system – (Taiwan)
- AN/TWQ-1 Avenger – (United States)
- CAMM – (United Kingdom, Italy)
- HİSAR – (Turkey)
- Iron Dome – (Israel)
- VL MICA – (France)
- Middle-range multi-purpose missile – (Japan)
- MIM-72 Chaparral – (United States)
- Multi-Mission Effects Vehicle – (Canada)
- NASAMS – (Norway, United States)
- Sky Sword II – (Taiwan)
- SPYDER – (Israel)
- United States Army air defense
