= Phalanx CIWS =

Close-in weapon system

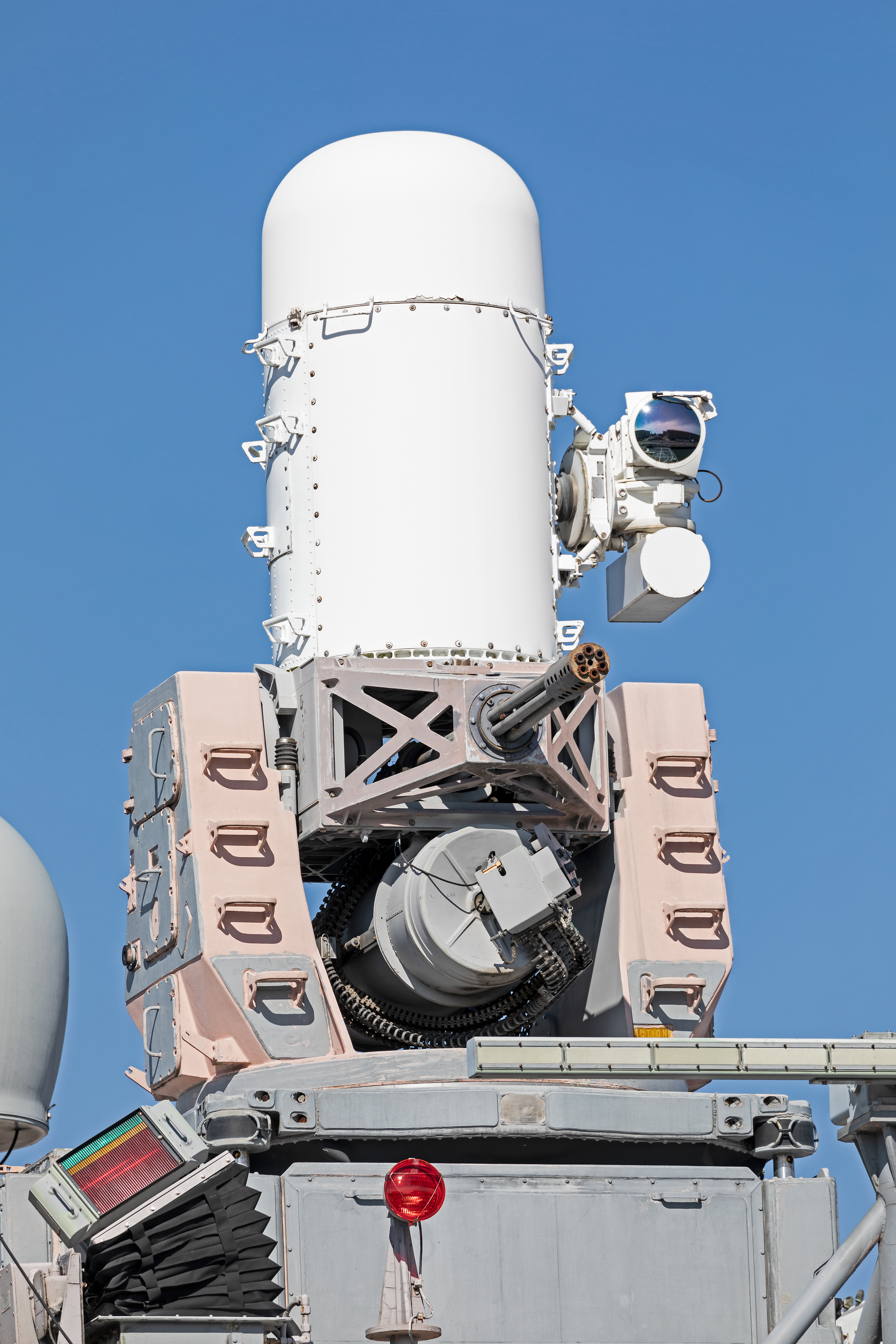
- Phalanx CIWS aboard the former USS Elrod (FFG-55) in 2019.
- Type: Close-in weapon system
- Place of origin: United States

Service history
- In service: 1980–present
- Used by: See operators
- Wars: Cold War; Persian Gulf War; Yemeni Civil War; Red Sea crisis

Production history
- Designer: General Dynamics
- Designed: 1969
- Manufacturer: General Dynamics
- Unit cost: 5 × Block 1B £8.56M each to UK; 9 × Block 1B US$13.66M each for SK; 13 × Mk 15 Block 1B Baseline 2 for TW, total cost: US$416M with 260,000 × Mk 244 Mod 0 armor-piercing bullet. 8 sets are for upgrading the current Block 0 to MK15 Phalanx Block 1B Baseline 2.
- Produced: 1978
- Variants: 3

Specifications (early models)
- Mass: 12,500 lb (5,700 kg)
- Barrel length: 59.8 in (1,520 mm) L76 gun (Block 0 & 1):
- Height: 15.5 ft (4.7 m)
- Shell: 20×102 mm tungsten armor-piercing discarding sabot (CIWS) or high-explosive incendiary tracer (C-RAM)
- Caliber: 20 mm (0.79 in)
- Barrels: 6-barrel (progressive RH parabolic twist, 9 grooves)
- Elevation: Block 0: −10°/+80°; Block 1: −20°/+80°; Block 1B: −25°/+85°
- Traverse: 150° from either side of centerline
- Rate of fire: 4,500 rounds/minute (75 rounds/second)
- Muzzle velocity: 3,600 ft/s (1,100 m/s)
- Effective firing range: 1,625 yd (1,486 m) max. effective range
- Maximum firing range: 6,000 yd (5,500 m)

The Phalanx CIWS (SEE-wiz) is an automated gun-based "Close-In Weapon System" to defend military watercraft automatically against incoming threats such as aircraft, missiles, and small boats. It was designed and manufactured by the General Dynamics Corporation, Pomona Division, later a part of Raytheon. Consisting of a radar-guided 20 mm (0.8 in) Vulcan cannon mounted on a swiveling base, the Phalanx has been used by the United States Navy and the naval forces of 15 other countries. The U.S. Navy deploys it on every class of surface combat ship, except the Zumwalt-class destroyer and San Antonio-class amphibious transport dock. Other users include the British Royal Navy, the Royal Australian Navy, the Royal New Zealand Navy, the Royal Canadian Navy, and the U.S. Coast Guard.

A land variant, the LPWS (Land Phalanx Weapon System), part of the Counter Rocket, Artillery, and Mortar (C-RAM) system, was developed. It was deployed to counter rocket, artillery and mortar attacks during the 2021 US withdrawal from Afghanistan. The U.S. Navy also fields the SeaRAM system, which pairs the RIM-116 Rolling Airframe Missile with sensors based on the Phalanx.

== History ==
The Phalanx Close-In Weapon System (CIWS) was developed as the last line of automated weapons defense (terminal defense or point defense) against all incoming threats, including antiship missiles (AShMs or ASMs), aircraft including high-g and maneuvering sea-skimmers, and small boats.

The first prototype system was offered to the U.S. Navy for evaluation on the destroyer leader USS King in 1973 and it was determined that further work was required to improve performance and reliability. Subsequently, the Phalanx Operational Suitability Model successfully completed its Operational Test and Evaluation (OT&E) on board the destroyer USS Bigelow in 1977. The model exceeded operational maintenance, reliability, and availability specifications. Another evaluation successfully followed, and the weapon system was approved for production in 1978. Phalanx production started with orders for 23 USN and 14 foreign military systems. The first ship fully fitted out was the aircraft carrier USS Coral Sea in 1980. The Navy began placing CIWS systems on non-combatant vessels in 1984.

== Design ==
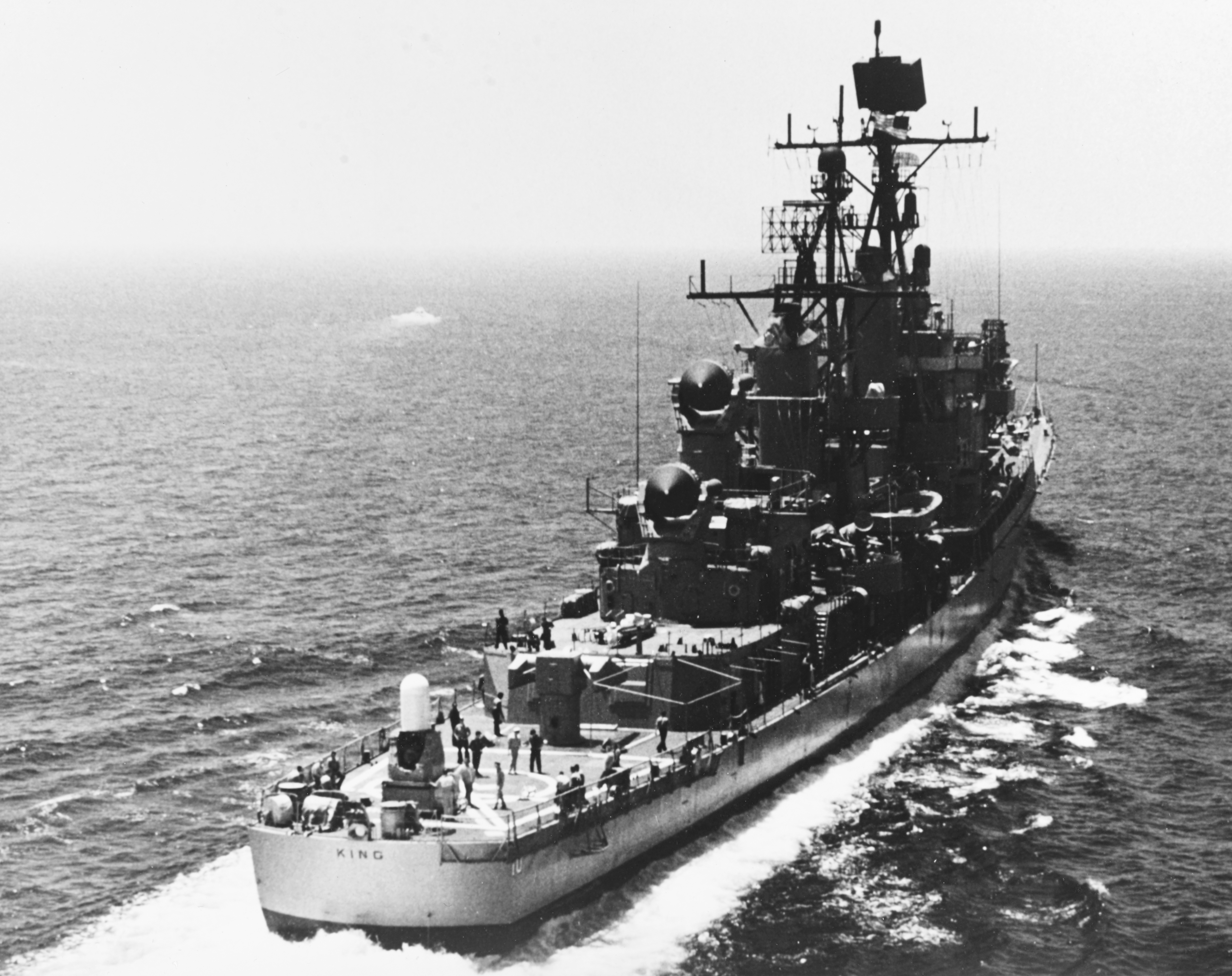
Phalanx prototype on the fantail of USS King in 1973

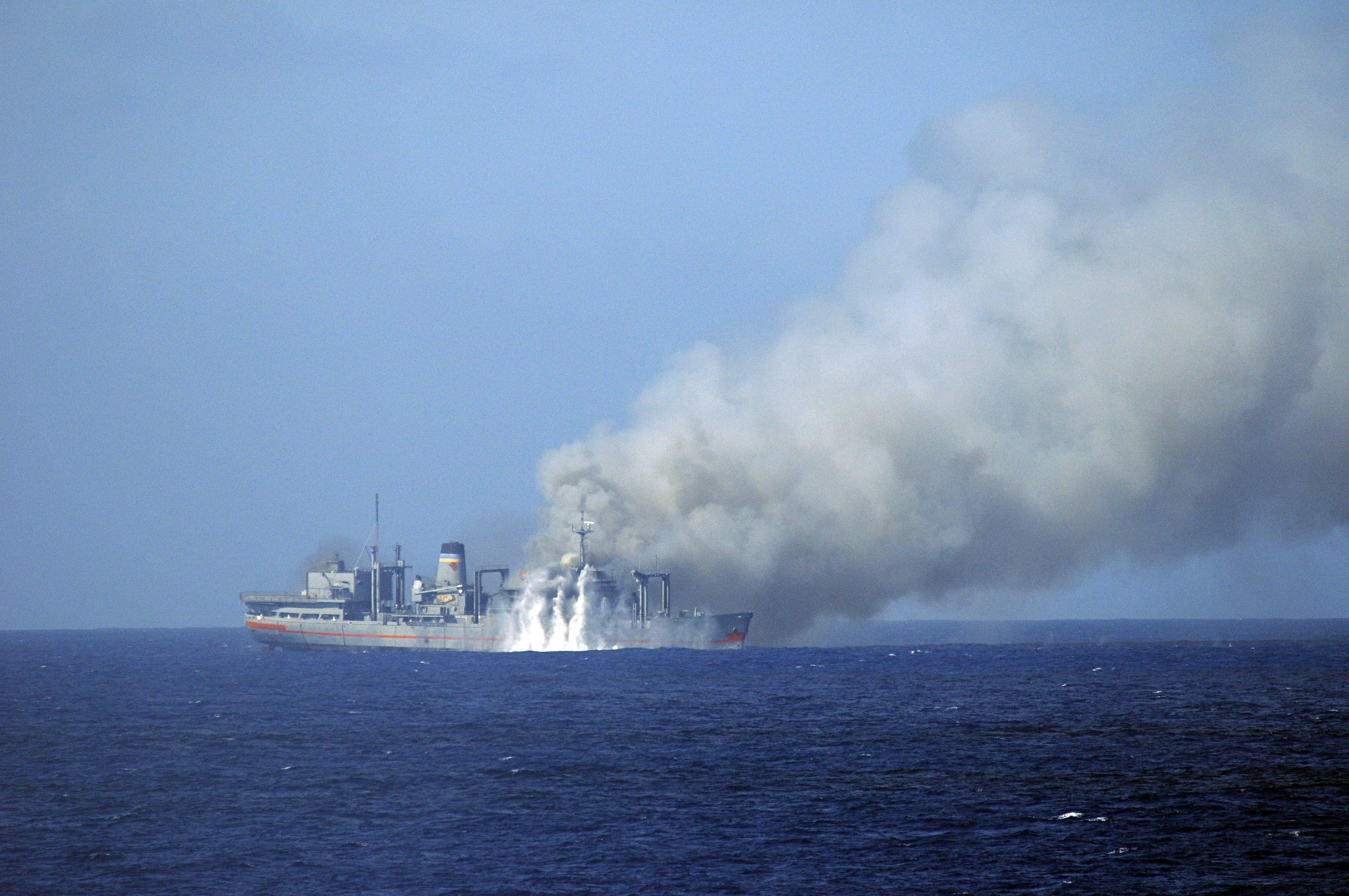
The ex-USNS Saturn during a sinking exercise, hit by rounds fired from the Mk-15 Phalanx CIWS onboard USS Mitscher

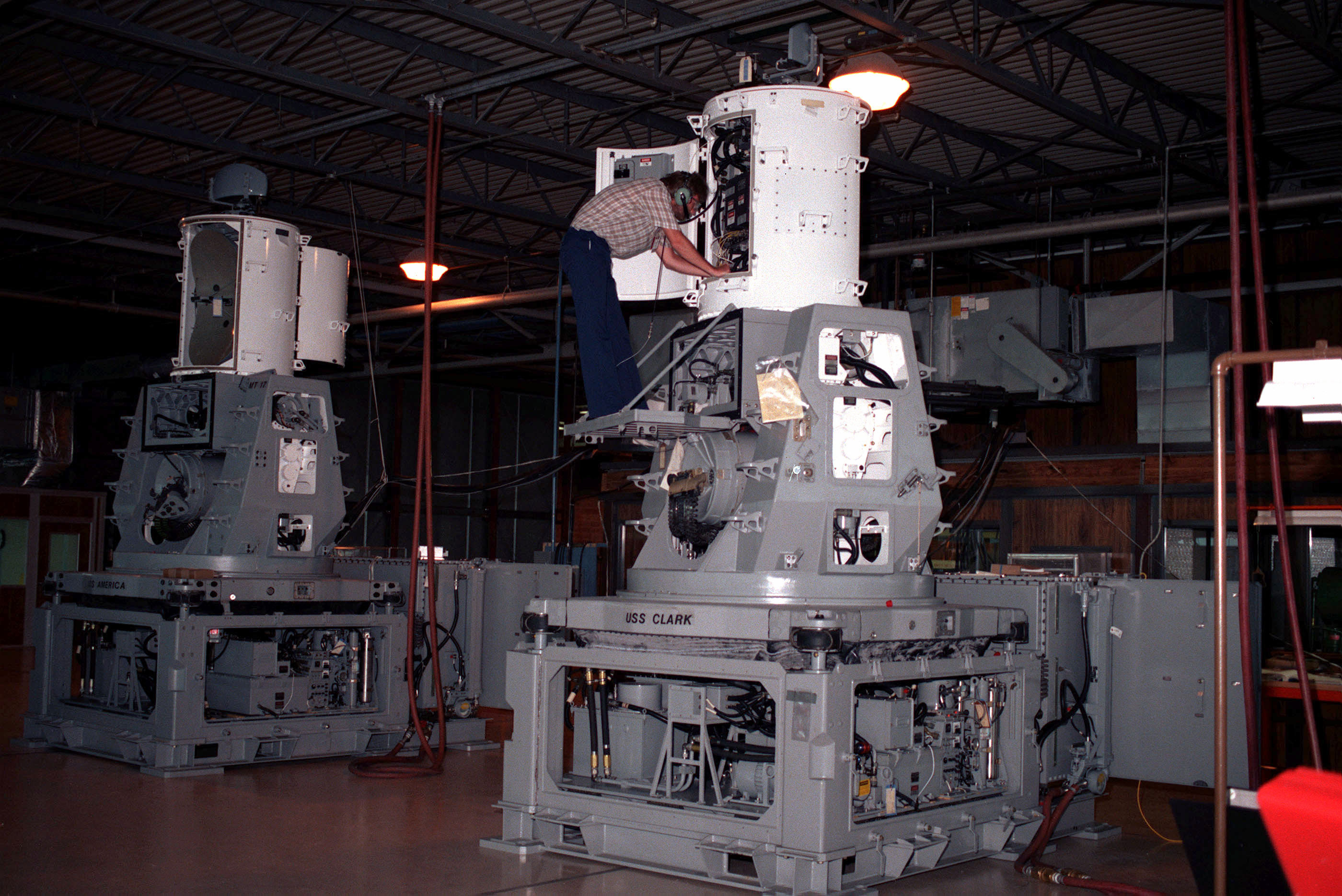
A technician checks the radar transmitter and microwave assemblies of a Phalanx CIWS; also visible (top left) is the search radar, with vertical tracking radar below it

The basis of the system is the 20 mm M61 Vulcan rotary cannon, used by the United States military on various tactical aircraft since 1959, linked to a K_{u} band fire control radar system for acquiring and tracking targets. This proven system was combined with a purpose-made mounting, capable of fast elevation and traverse speeds, to track incoming targets. An entirely self-contained unit, the mounting houses the gun, an automated fire-control system and all other major components, enabling it to automatically search for, detect, track, engage, and confirm kills using its computer-controlled radar system. Owing to this self-contained nature, Phalanx is ideal for support ships, which lack integrated targeting systems and generally have limited sensors. The entire unit has a mass between 12,400 to 13,500 lb (5,600 to 6,100 kg).

Because of their distinctive barrel-shaped radome and their automated operation, Phalanx CIWS units are sometimes nicknamed "R2-D2" after the droid from the Star Wars films.

=== Upgrades ===
The Phalanx system has been developed through several configurations. The basic (original) is the Block 0, equipped with first-generation, solid-state electronics and with marginal capability against surface targets. The Block 1 (1988) upgrade improved radar, ammunition, computing power, rate of fire, and an increase in maximum engagement elevation to +70 degrees. These improvements were intended to increase the system's capability against emerging Russian supersonic anti-ship missiles. Block 1A introduced a new computer system to counter more maneuverable targets. The Block 1B PSuM (Phalanx Surface Mode, 1999) adds a forward-looking infrared (FLIR) sensor to make the weapon effective against surface targets. This addition was developed to provide ship defense against small vessel threats and other "floaters" in littoral waters and to improve the weapon's performance against slower low-flying aircraft. The FLIR's capability is also of use against low-observability missiles and can be linked with the RIM-116 Rolling Airframe Missile (RAM) system to increase RAM engagement range and accuracy. The Block 1B also allows for an operator to visually identify and target threats.

Since the end of FY 2015, the US Navy has upgraded all Phalanx systems to the Block 1B variant. In addition to the FLIR sensor, the Block 1B incorporates an automatic acquisition video tracker, optimized gun barrels (OGB), and Enhanced Lethality Cartridges (ELC) for additional capabilities against asymmetric threats such as small maneuvering surface craft, slow-flying fixed and rotary-winged aircraft, and unmanned aerial vehicles. The FLIR sensor improves performance against anti-ship cruise missiles, while the OGB and ELC provide tighter dispersion and increased "first-hit" range; the Mk 244 ELC is specifically designed to penetrate anti-ship missiles with a 48 percent heavier tungsten penetrator round and an aluminum nose piece. Another system upgrade is the Phalanx 1B Baseline 2 radar to improve detection performance, increase reliability, and reduce maintenance. It also has a surface mode to track, detect, and destroy threats closer to the water's surface, increasing the ability to defend against fast-attack boats and low-flying missiles. As of 2019, the Baseline 2 radar upgrade has been installed on all U.S. Navy Phalanx system-equipped vessels. The Block 1B is also used by other navies, such as Canada, Portugal, Japan, Egypt, Bahrain, and the UK.

US Navy Phalanx CIWS maintenance and live firing test

In April 2017, Raytheon tested a new electric gun for the Phalanx allowing the system to fire at varying rates to conserve ammunition. The new design replaces the pneumatic motor, compressor, and storage tanks, reducing system weight by 180 lb (82 kg) while increasing reliability and reducing operating costs.

== Operation ==
The CIWS is designed to be the last line of defense against anti-ship missiles. Due to its design criteria, its effective range is very short relative to the range of modern ASMs, from 1 to 5 nautical miles (2 to 9 km). The gun mount moves at a very high speed and with great precision. The system takes minimal inputs from the ship, making it capable of functioning despite potential damage to the ship.

The only inputs required for operation are 440 V AC three-phase electric power at 60 Hz and water (for electronics cooling). For full operation, including some nonessential functions, it also has inputs for ship's true compass heading and 115 V AC for the WinPASS subsystem. WinPASS (Windows-based Parameter Analysis and Storage Subsystem) is a secondary computer built into the local control station that allows technicians to perform various tests on system hardware and software for maintenance and troubleshooting purposes. It also stores data from any engagements the system conducts so that it can later be analyzed.

=== Radar subsystems ===
The CIWS has two antennas that work together to engage targets. The first antenna, for searching, is located inside the radome on the weapon control group (top of the white-painted portion). The search subsystem provides bearing, range, velocity, heading, and altitude information of potential targets to the CIWS computer. This information is analyzed to determine whether the detected object should be engaged by the CIWS system. Once the computer identifies a valid target (see details below), the mount moves to face the target and then hands the target over to the tracking antenna at around 4.5 nautical miles (8 km). The track antenna is extremely precise, but views a much smaller area. The tracking subsystem observes the target until the computer determines that the probability of a successful hit is maximized and then, depending on the operator conditions, the system either fires automatically at around 1 nautical mile (2 km) or recommends fire to the operator. While firing 75 rounds per second, the system tracks outgoing rounds and 'walks' them onto the target.

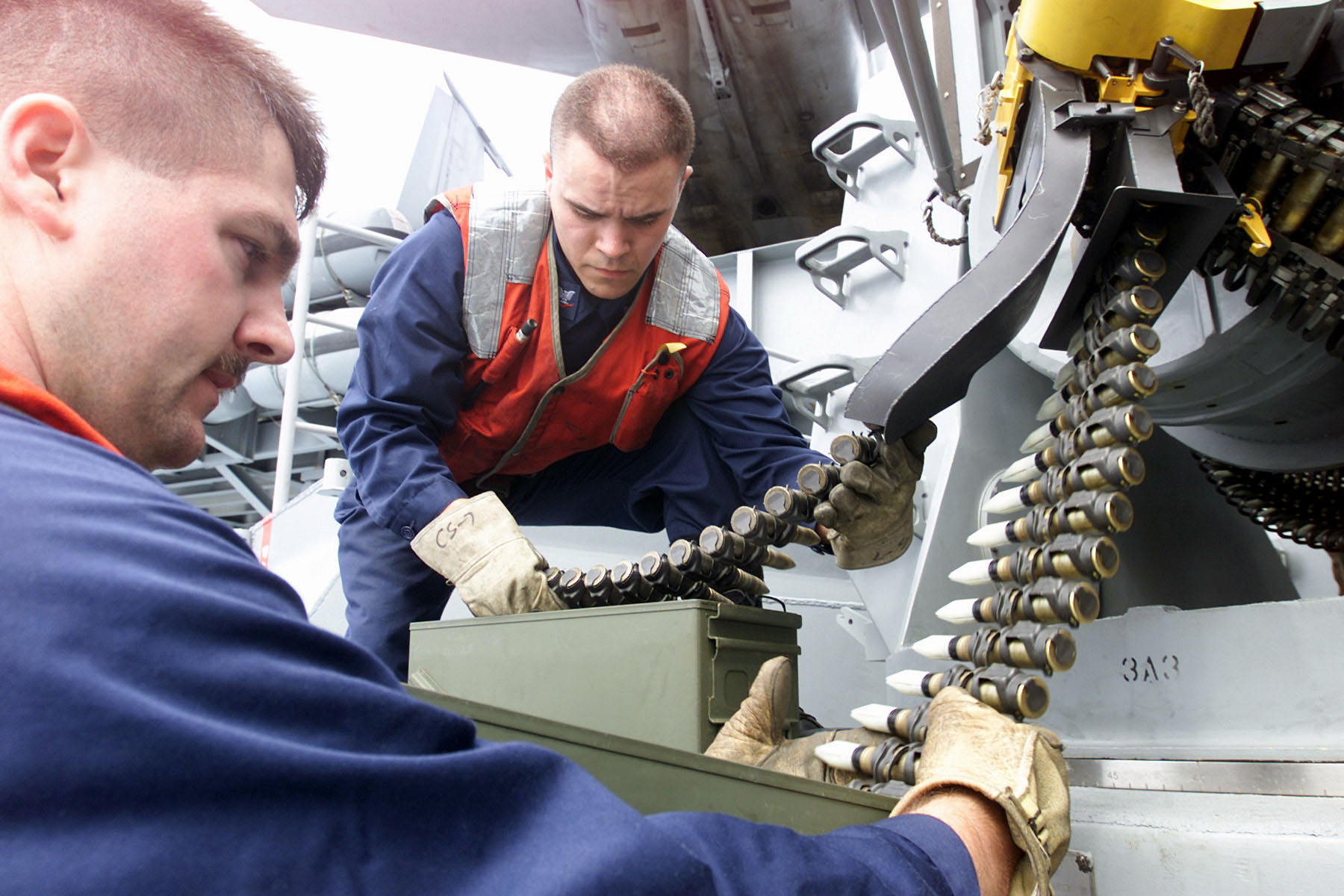
U.S. Navy sailors load tungsten ammunition (white sabots at right) and offload dummy ammunition (left).

=== Gun and ammunition handling system ===
The Block 0 CIWS mounts (hydraulic driven) fired at a rate of 3,000 rounds per minute and held 989 rounds in the magazine drum. The Block 1 CIWS mounts (hydraulic) also fired at 3,000 rounds per minute with an extended magazine drum holding 1,550 rounds. The Block 1A and newer (pneumatic driven) CIWS mounts fire at a rate of 4,500 rounds per minute with a 1,550-round magazine. The velocity of the rounds fired is about 3,600 feet per second (1,100 m/s). The rounds are armor-piercing tungsten penetrator rounds or depleted uranium with discardable plastic sabots. The Phalanx CIWS 20 mm rounds are designed to destroy a missile's airframe and make it non-aerodynamic, thus keeping shrapnel from the exploding projectile to a minimum, effectively keeping secondary damage to a minimum. The ammunition handling system has two conveyor belt systems. The first takes the rounds out of the magazine drum to the gun; the second takes empty shells or unfired rounds to the opposite end of the drum.

The 20 mm APDS rounds consist of a 15 mm (0.59 in) penetrator encased in a plastic sabot and a lightweight metal pusher. Rounds fired by the Phalanx cost around $30 each and the gun typically fires 100 or more when engaging a target.

=== CIWS contact target identification ===
The CIWS does not recognize identification friend or foe, also known as IFF. The CIWS has only the data it collects in real time from the radars to decide if the target is a threat and to engage it. A contact must meet multiple criteria for the CIWS to consider it a target. These criteria include:

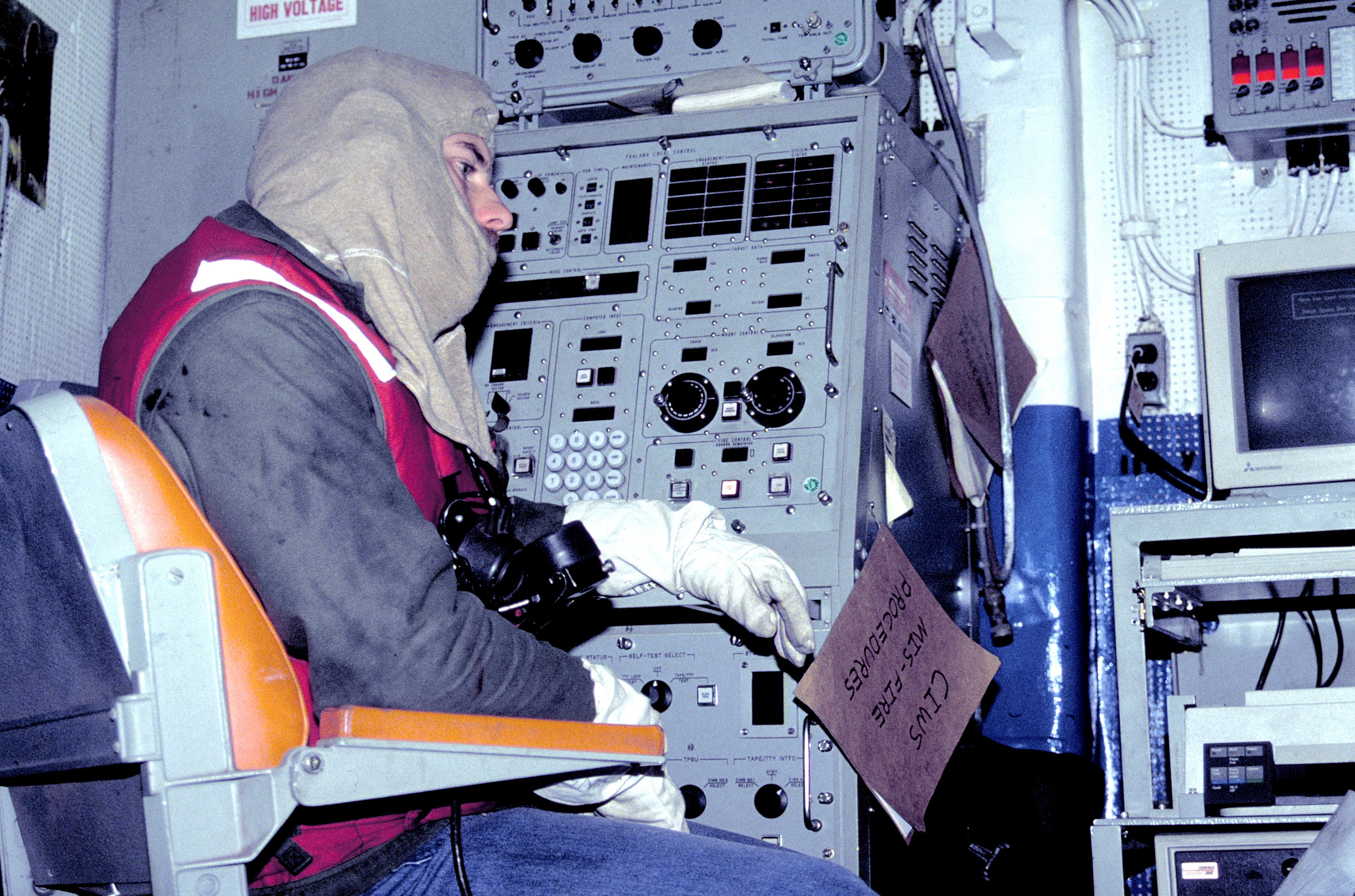
A sailor sits at a CIWS Local Control Panel (LCP) during a general quarters drill.

1. Is the range of the target increasing or decreasing in relation to the ship? The CIWS search radar sees contacts that are out-bound and discards them. The CIWS engages a target only if it is approaching the ship.
2. Is the contact capable of maneuvering to hit the ship? If a contact is not heading directly at the ship, the CIWS looks at its heading in relation to the ship and its velocity. It then decides if the contact can still perform a maneuver to hit the ship.
3. Is the contact traveling between the minimum and maximum velocities? The CIWS has the ability to engage targets that travel in a wide range of speeds; however, it is not an infinitely wide range. The system has a target maximum-velocity limit. If a target exceeds this velocity, the CIWS does not engage it. It also has a target minimum-velocity limit, and does not engage any contact below that velocity. The operator can adjust the minimum and maximum limits within the limits of the system.

There are many other subsystems that together ensure proper operation, such as environmental control, transmitter, mount movement control, power control and distribution, and so on. It takes six to eight months to train a technician to maintain, operate, and repair the CIWS.

== Incidents ==
=== Drone exercise accidents ===
On 10 February 1983, USS Antrim was conducting a live-fire exercise off the East Coast of the United States using the Phalanx against a target drone. Although the drone was successfully engaged at close range, the debris of the destroyed target bounced off the sea surface and struck the ship, causing significant damage and fire from the drone's residual fuel and killing a civilian instructor aboard the ship.

On 13 October 1989, USS El Paso was conducting a live-fire exercise off the East Coast of the United States using the Phalanx against a target drone. The drone was successfully engaged, but as the drone fell to the sea, the CIWS re-engaged it as a continued threat to El Paso. Rounds from the Phalanx struck the bridge of USS Iwo Jima, killing one officer and injuring a petty officer.

=== Iran–Iraq War ===
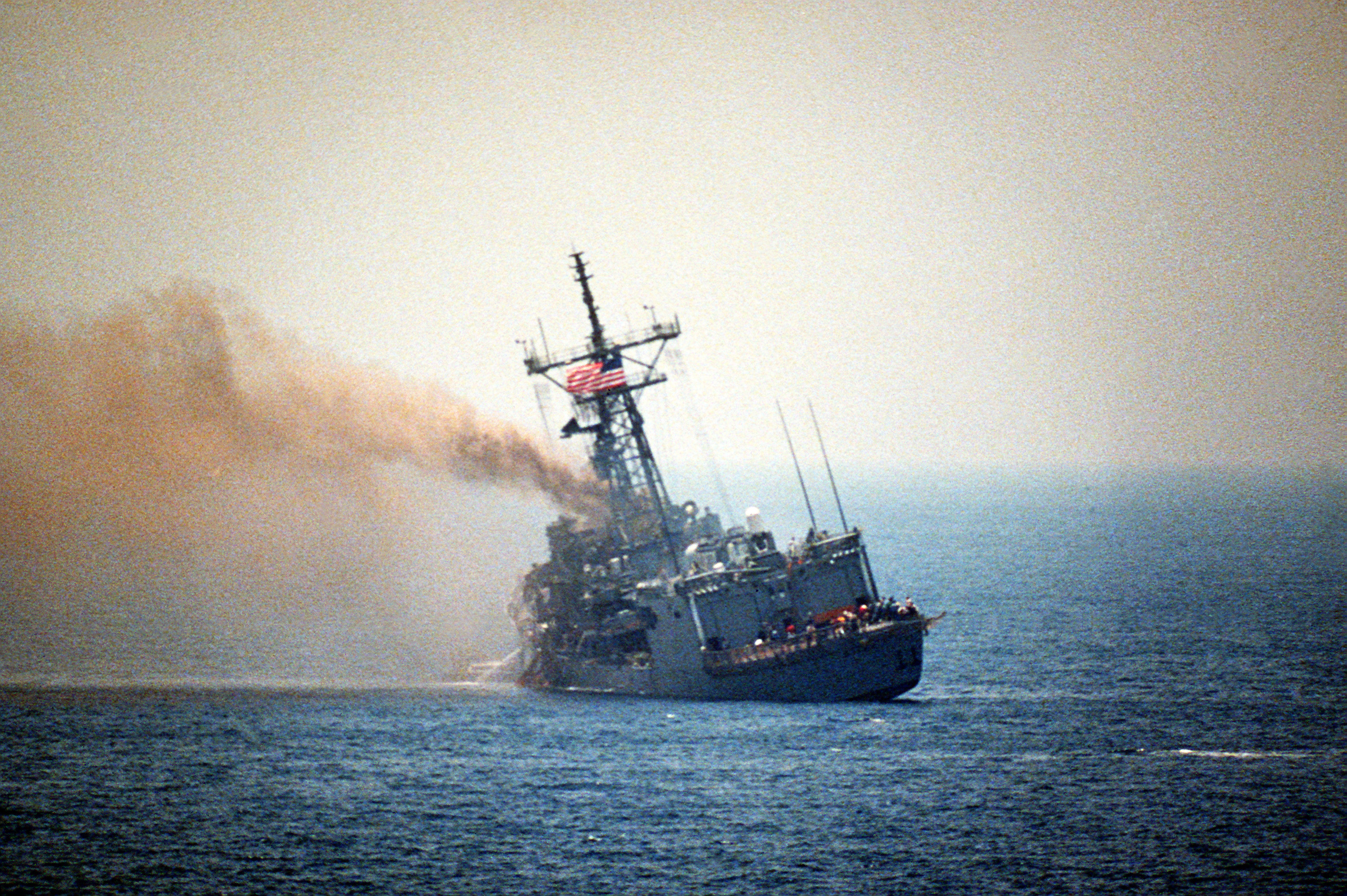
Stark listing after being hit.

On 17 May 1987, during the Iran–Iraq War, which the US was observing as a non-combatant, an Iraqi Dassault Mirage F1 fighter fired two Exocet missiles at what was deemed to be a suitable target, but was the American frigate USS Stark.

The Phalanx CIWS remained in standby mode and the Mark 36 SRBOC countermeasures were not armed, as no attack had been expected. Both missiles struck the port side of the ship near the bridge. 37 United States Navy personnel were killed and 21 wounded. Iraq apologized and paid compensation for this unintentional attack.

=== Iraqi missile attack in 1991 Gulf War ===
On 25 February 1991, during the first Gulf War, the Phalanx-equipped frigate USS Jarrett was a few miles from the U.S. Navy battleship USS Missouri and the Royal Navy destroyer HMS Gloucester. An Iraqi missile battery fired two Silkworm anti-ship missiles (often referred to as the Seersucker); Missouri responded by firing its SRBOC chaff countermeasures. The Phalanx system on Jarrett, operating in automatic target-acquisition mode, fixed on Missouri's chaff and fired a burst of rounds, of which four hit Missouri, 2 to 3 nautical miles (roughly 3 1/2 to 5 1/2 km) from Jarrett at the time. There were no injuries on Missouri, and the Iraqi missiles were destroyed by Sea Dart missiles fired by Gloucester.

=== Pearl Harbor accidental discharge ===
On May 5, 1994, the port side Phalanx on board the USS Lake Erie accidentally fired two depleted uranium rounds while the ship was at its berth at Pearl Harbor, Hawaii. Sailors were conducting a firing circuit test as part of routine maintenance on the CIWS system at the time. A Judge Advocate General investigation concluded that required CIWS pre- and post-firing inspections had not been properly conducted and the rounds had gone undetected in the ammunition drive. It is believed by the Navy that the rounds fell in an undeveloped mountainous area near Aiea, HI. There were no reports of any injuries or property damage as a result of the accidental discharge.

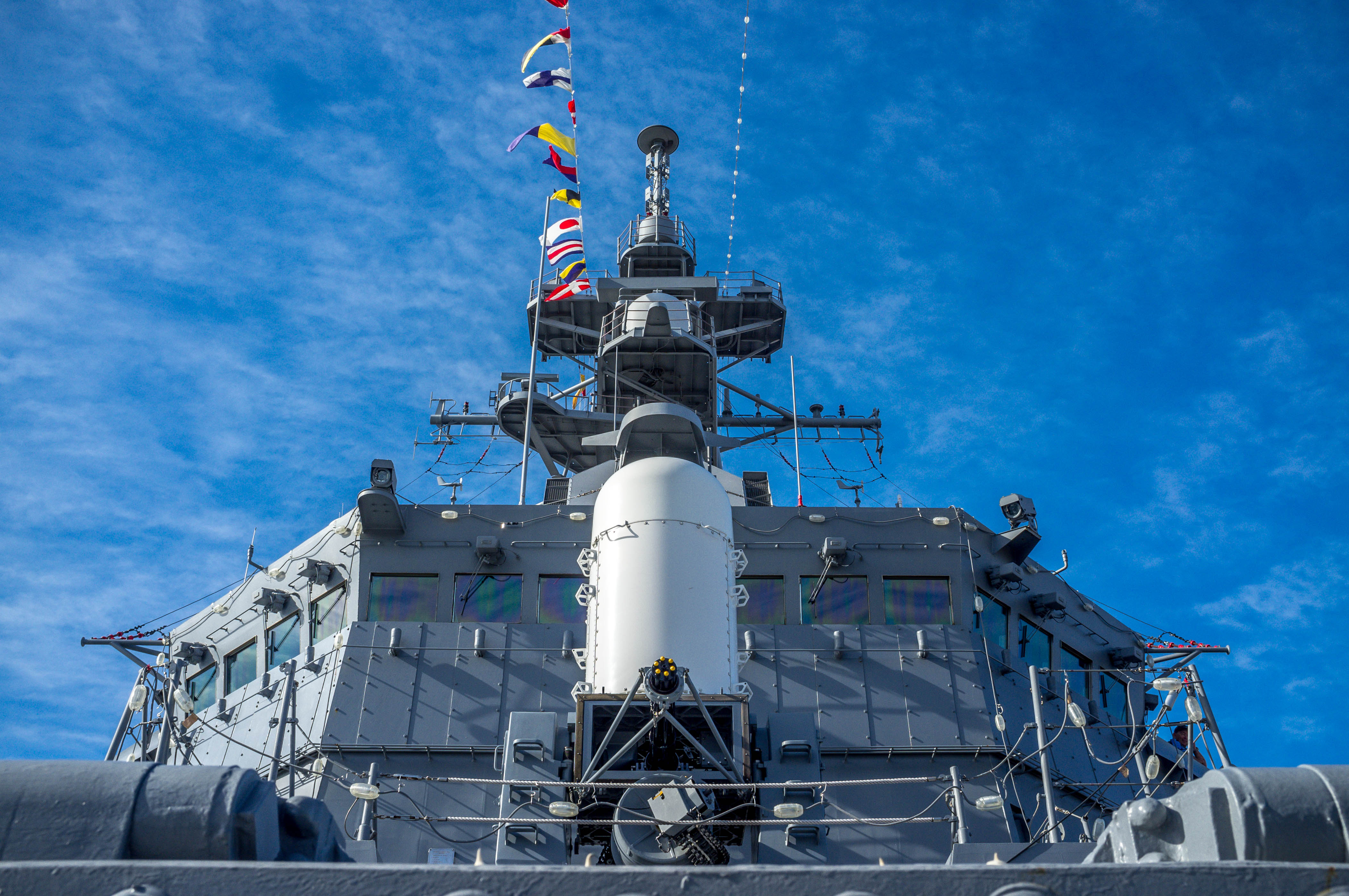
JMSDF mounted Phalanx CIWS

=== Accidental shoot-down of US aircraft by Japanese ship ===
On 4 June 1996, a Phalanx operated by the JMSDF accidentally shot down a US A-6 Intruder from the aircraft carrier USS Independence that was towing a radar target during gunnery exercises about 1,500 mi (2,400 km) west of the main Hawaiian island of Oahu. The Asagiri-class destroyer JDS Yūgiri locked onto the Intruder instead of the target, or tracked up the tow cable after acquiring the towed target. The aircraft's two-man crew ejected safely. A post-accident investigation concluded that Yūgiri's gunnery officer gave the order to fire before the A-6 was out of the CIWS engagement envelope.

=== Red Sea crisis ===
CIWS firing (1:14)
CIWS aboard USS Peleliu (LHA-5) firing in July 2012

On 30 January 2024, Houthi terrorists fired an anti-ship cruise missile toward the Red Sea. The missile came within a mile of the Arleigh Burke-class destroyer USS Gravely. The Phalanx CIWS aboard Gravely was used to shoot down the missile. This was the first time the Phalanx CIWS was used to down a Houthi-fired missile. No damage or injuries were reported.

== Centurion C-RAM ==
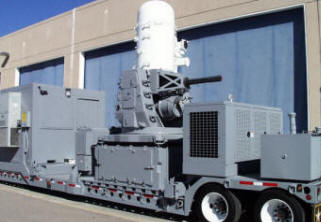
Centurion C-RAM

Seeking a solution to continual rocket and mortar attacks on bases in Iraq, the U.S. Army requested a quick-to-field antiprojectile system in May 2004, as part of its Counter-Rocket, Artillery, Mortar initiative. The result of this program was the "Centurion". For all intents and purposes a terrestrial version of the Navy's CIWS, the Centurion was rapidly developed, with a proof-of-concept test in November that same year. Deployment to Iraq began in 2005, where it was set up to protect forward operating bases and other high-value sites in and around the capital, Baghdad. Israel purchased a single system for testing purposes, and was reported to have considered buying the system to counter rocket attacks and defend point military installations. However, the swift and effective development and performance of Israel's indigenous Iron dome system has ruled out any purchase or deployment of Centurion. Each system consists of a modified Phalanx 1B CIWS, powered by an attached generator and mounted on a trailer for mobility. Including the same 20 mm M61A1 Gatling gun, the unit is likewise capable of firing 4,500 20 mm rounds per minute. In 2008, there were more than 20 C-RAM systems protecting bases in the U.S. Central Command area of operations. A Raytheon spokesman told the Navy Times that 105 attacks were defeated by the systems, most of them involving mortars. Based on the success of Centurion, 23 additional systems were ordered in September 2008.

Like the naval (1B) version, Centurion uses Ku-band radar and FLIR to detect and track incoming projectiles, and is also capable of engaging surface targets, with the system able to reach a minus-25-degree elevation. The Centurion is reportedly capable of defending a 0.5 mi^{2} (1.3 km^{2}) area. One major difference between the land- and sea-based variants is the choice of ammunition. Whereas naval Phalanx systems fire tungsten armor-piercing rounds, the C-RAM uses the 20 mm HEIT-SD (High-Explosive Incendiary Tracer, Self-Destruct) ammunition, originally developed for the M163 Vulcan Air Defense System. These rounds explode if they impact a target, but if they miss they self-destruct on tracer burnout, greatly reducing the risk of collateral damage from misses.

== Operators ==
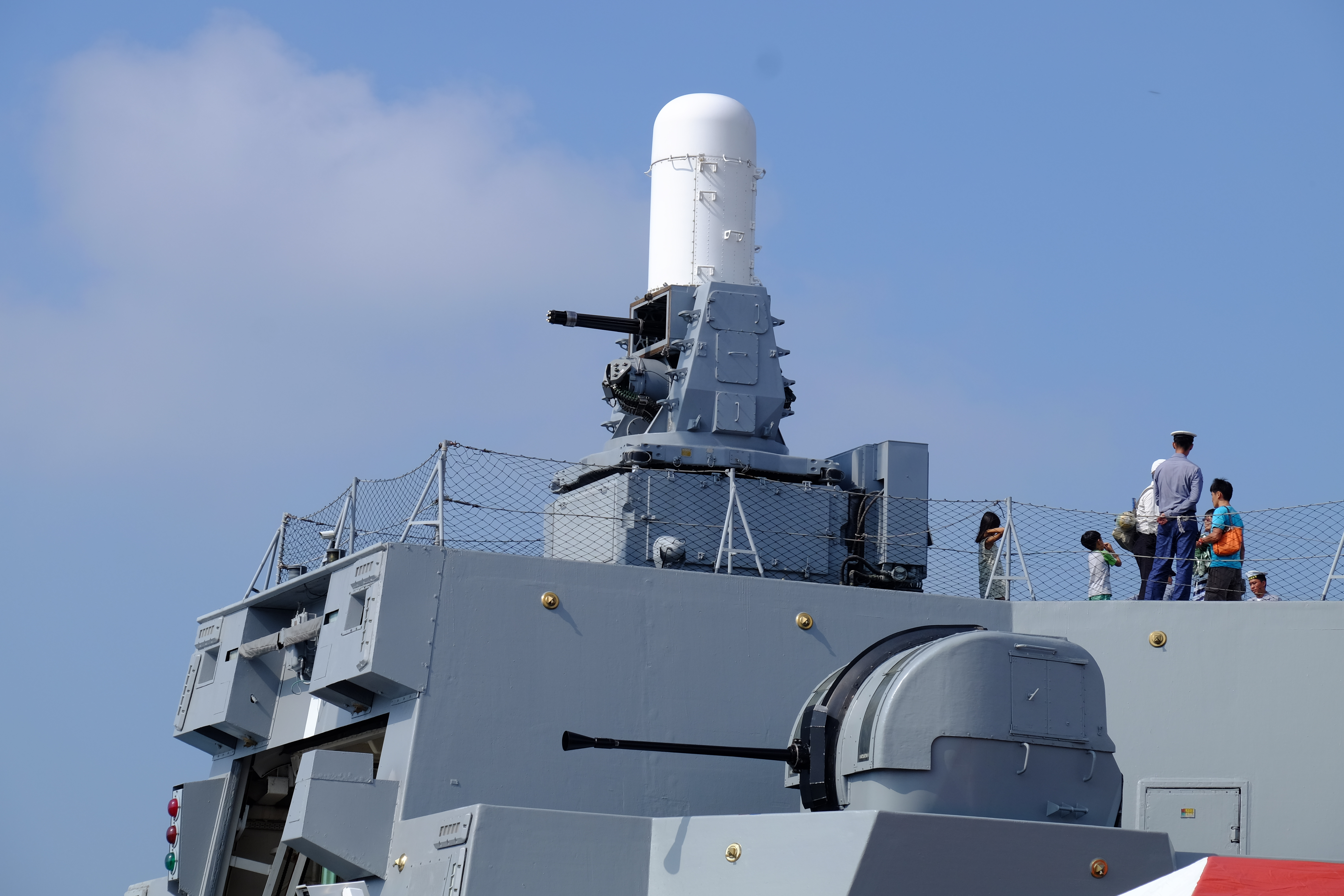
Phalanx CIWS and Bofors 40mm L70 Gun aboard ROCN Di Hua (PFG-1206)

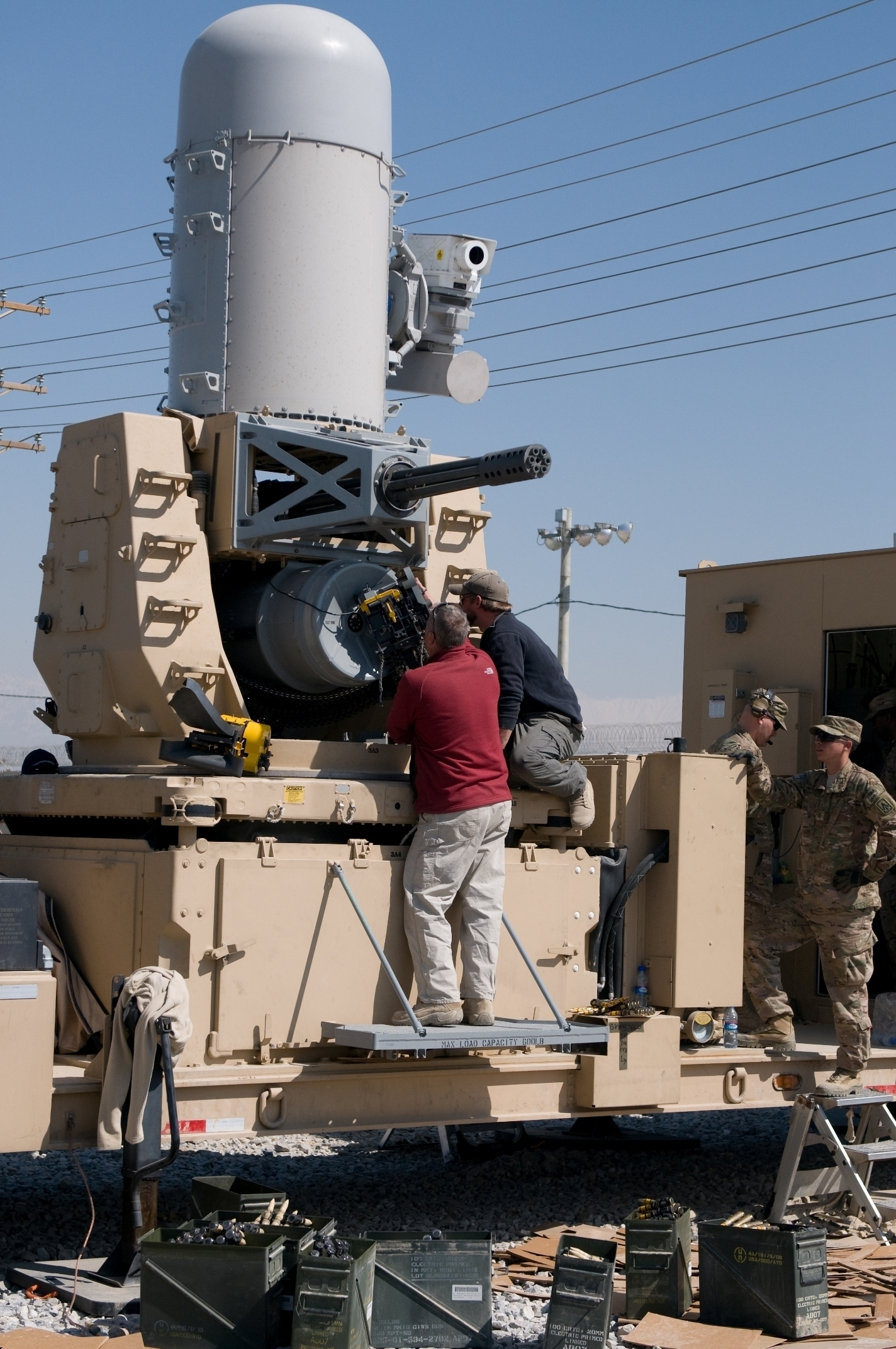
Phalanx LPWS conducts a test fire system at Bagram Air Field, Afghanistan on March 1, 2014.

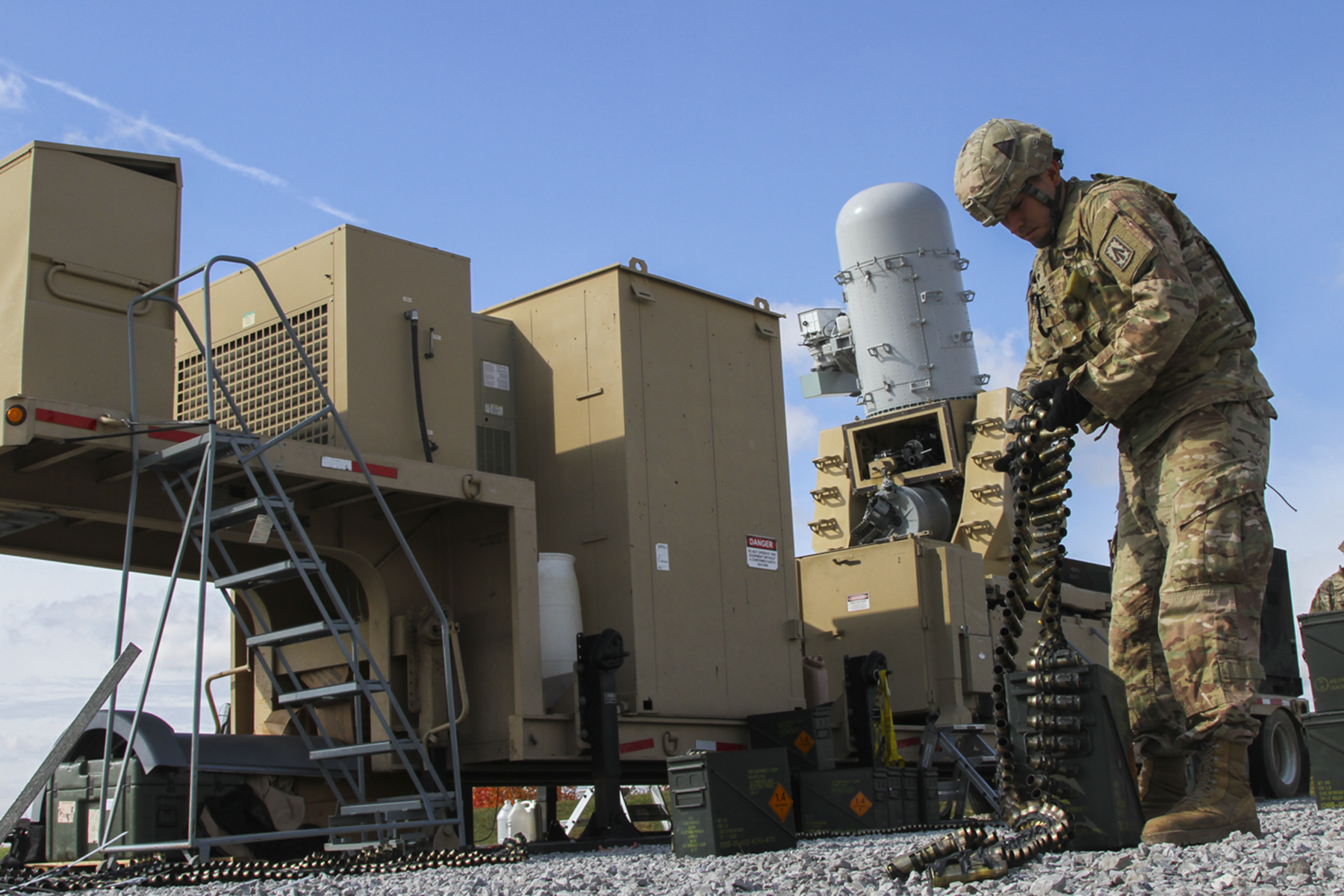
Phalanx LPWS during the battalion's live fire exercise on Fort Campbell, Kentucky.

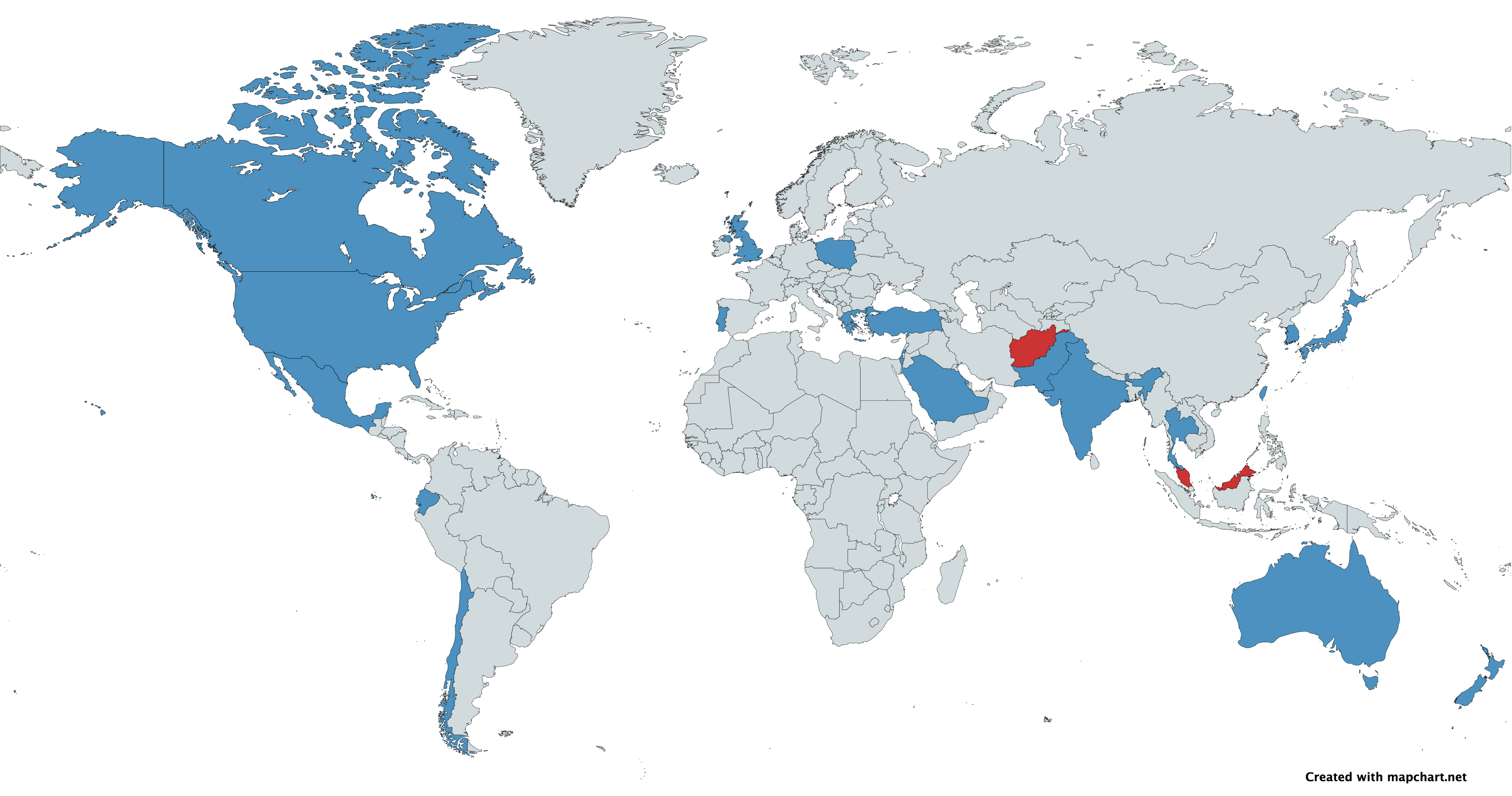
Map with Phalanx CIWS users in blue and former users in red

=== Current operators ===
Australia

- Bay-class landing ship
- Hobart-class destroyer
- Supply-class replenishment oiler

Bahrain

- Oliver Hazard Perry-class frigate

Canada

- Halifax-class frigate
- Protecteur-class auxiliary vessel

Chile

- Adelaide-class frigate

Ecuador

- Condell-class frigate

Egypt

- Oliver Hazard Perry-class frigate
- Knox-class frigate
- Ambassador MK III missile boat

Greece

- Hydra-class frigate
- Elli-class frigate
- Etna-class replenishment oiler

Israel

- Sa'ar 5-class corvette
- Sa'ar 4.5-class missile boat

Japan

- Izumo-class helicopter destroyer
- Hyuga-class helicopter destroyer
- Osumi-class tank landing ship
- Maya-class destroyer
- Kongo-class destroyer
- Atago-class destroyer
- Hatakaze-class destroyer
- Asahi-class destroyer
- Akizuki-class destroyer
- Takanami-class destroyer
- Murasame-class destroyer
- Asagiri-class destroyer
- Abukuma-class destroyer escort

Mexico

- Knox-class frigate
- Sa'ar 4.5-class missile boat

New Zealand

- Anzac-class frigate
- HMNZS Aotearoa

Pakistan

- Oliver Hazard Perry-class frigate
- PNS Moawin (A39)
- PNS Nasr (A47)
- Yarmook-class corvette

Poland

- Oliver Hazard Perry-class frigate

Portugal

- Vasco da Gama-class frigate

Saudi Arabia

- Badr-class corvette
- Al Sadiq-class patrol ship

South Korea

- Daegu-class frigate
- Incheon-class frigate
- Dokdo-class amphibious assault ship
- Soyang AOE-II-class Fast combat support ship

Thailand

- Bhumibol Adulyadej-class frigate

Turkey

- Oliver Hazard Perry-class frigate
- TCG Anadolu LHD
- Bayraktar-class tank landing ship
- Akar-class replenishment oiler

Taiwan (13 sets MK15 Phalanx Block 1B Baseline 2, 8 set is for upgrading the current Block 0 to MK15 Phalanx Block 1B Baseline 2, total cost: 0.416B with 260K MK 244 MOD 0 armor piercing bullet, Baseline2 is the newest model in Block 1B on 11/2016)

- Kidd-class destroyer
- Kang Ding-class frigate
- Oliver Hazard Perry-class frigate
- Knox-class frigate
- Anchorage-class dock landing ship
- Newport-class tank landing ship
- Pan Shi-class fast combat support ship
- Yushan-class landing platform dock
- Tuo Chiang-class corvette

United Kingdom

- Queen Elizabeth-class aircraft carrier
- Albion-class landing platform dock
- Bay-class landing ship
- Type 45 destroyer
- Type 26 frigate
- Tide-class tanker
- Wave-class tanker

United States

- Gerald R. Ford-class aircraft carrier
- Nimitz-class aircraft carrier
- America-class amphibious assault ship
- Wasp-class amphibious assault ship
- Whidbey Island-class dock landing ship
- Harpers Ferry-class dock landing ship
- Ticonderoga-class cruiser
- Arleigh Burke-class destroyer
- Legend-class cutter
- Blue Ridge-class command ship

=== Former deployment ===
Australia

- Adelaide-class frigate
- Perth-class destroyer

Canada

- Protecteur-class replenishment oiler
- Iroquois-class destroyer
- Restigouche-class destroyer (Gulf War upgrades)

India

- Austin-class amphibious transport dock

Japan

- Haruna-class destroyer
- Shirane-class destroyer
- Tachikaze-class destroyer
- Hatsuyuki-class destroyer

Malaysia

- KD Sri Inderapura

New Zealand

- Leander-class frigate

Pakistan

- Tariq-class destroyer

Thailand

- Knox-class frigate

Taiwan

- Gearing-class destroyer

United Kingdom

- Invincible-class aircraft carrier
- Type 42 destroyer
- HMS Ocean (L12)
- Fearless-class landing platform dock

United States

- Oliver Hazard Perry-class frigate
- Knox-class frigate
- Kidd-class destroyer
- Spruance-class destroyer
- Belknap-class cruiser
- California-class cruiser
- Leahy-class cruiser
- Long Beach-class cruiser
- Virginia-class cruiser
- Iowa-class battleship
- Iwo Jima-class amphibious assault ship
- Tarawa-class amphibious assault ship
- Austin-class amphibious transport dock
- Forrestal-class aircraft carrier
- Kitty Hawk-class aircraft carrier
- Midway-class aircraft carrier
- Wichita-class replenishment oiler
- Sacramento-class fast combat support ship
- Anchorage-class dock landing ship
- Newport-class tank landing ship

=== Former operators ===
Afghanistan

- Hamid Karzai International Airport in the Afghan capital Kabul – Decommissioned following 2021 evacuation from Afghanistan

== Specifications (Block 1A/B) ==
- Gun: 1× 20 mm M61A2 Vulcan 6-barreled Gatling cannon
- Height: 15.5 ft (4.7 m)
- Weight: 12,500 lb (5,700 kg), later models 13,600 lb (6,200 kg)
- Elevation: −25° to +85°
- Muzzle velocity: 3,600 ft/s (1,100 m/s)
- Rate of fire: 4,500 rounds/minute
- Maximum burst size: 1000 rounds
- Ammunition capacity: 1,550 rounds
- Radar: Ku band
- Cost: $12 Million
- Target Mach: 2.

== Similar systems ==
- SeaRAM, American system based on the RIM-116 Rolling Airframe Missile with a sensor system based on the Phalanx
- AK-630, Russian CIWS
- Kashtan CIWS, Russian Gun-Missile CIWS
- Goalkeeper CIWS, Dutch CIWS based on the GAU-8 Avenger autocannon
- Aselsan GOKDENIZ, Turkish CIWS
- Meroka CIWS, Spanish navy
- Barak 1, Israel. missile-based
- Type 730 CIWS, Chinese CIWS
- Millenium Gun, Swiss CIWS
- Rheinmetall Sea Snake, German CIWS
- OSU-35K, Polish 35mm CIWS
