= Centurion C-RAM =

American air defense artillery system

Phalanx
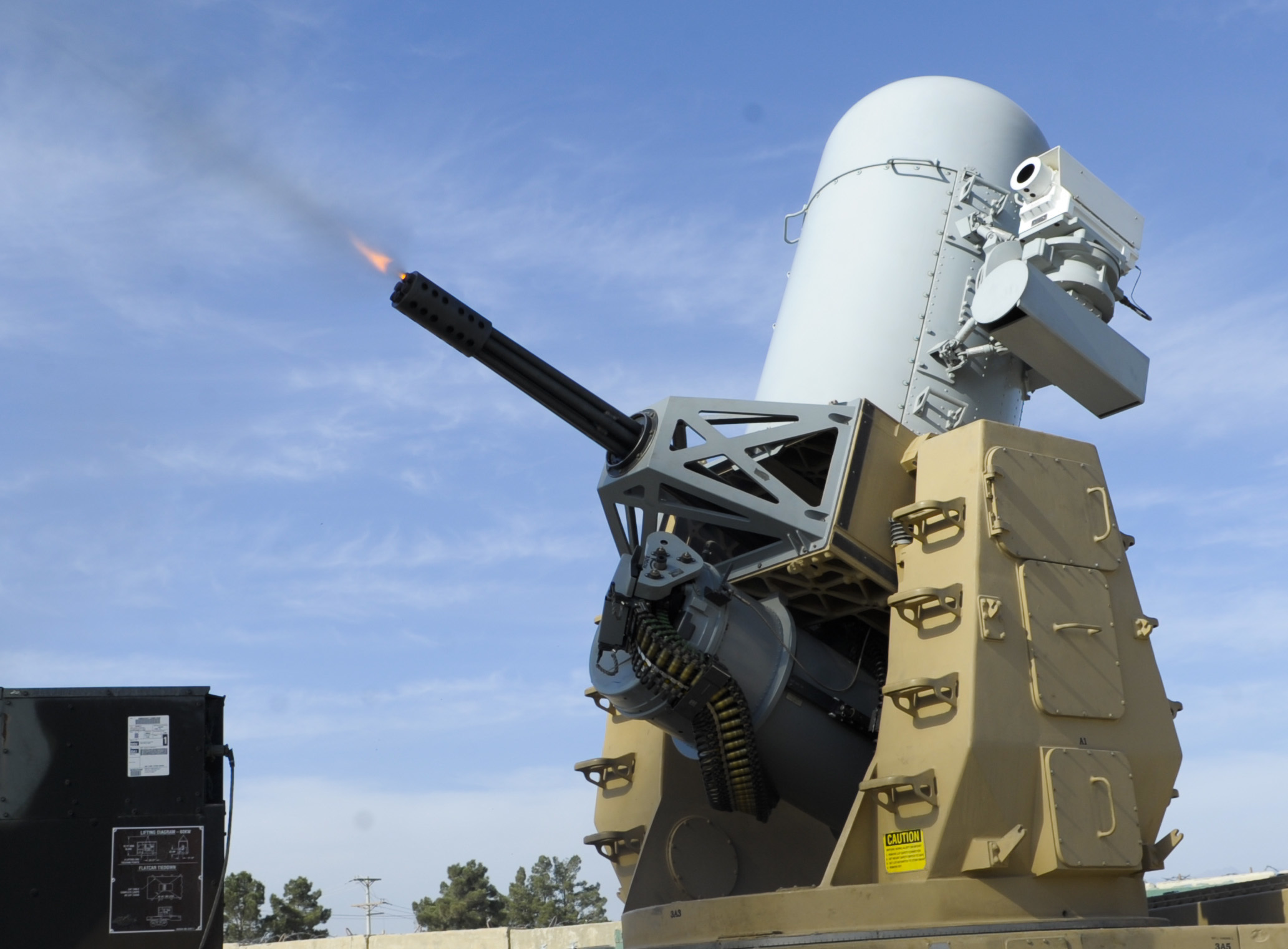
- A Phalanx C-RAM
- Type: Air defense artillery
- Place of origin: United States

Service history
- In service: 2004–present
- Used by: NATO; United states
- Wars: War in Iran; Iraq War; Afghanistan War

Production history
- Designer: L3 Communications; Raytheon
- Manufacturer: General Dynamics; Lockheed Martin; Raytheon

Specifications
- Shell: M-940 20mm MPT-SD
- Caliber: 20 mm (0.79 in)
- Barrels: 6, M61A1 type barrel
- Rate of fire: 4,500 RPM
- Effective firing range: 2,000 meters
- Maximum firing range: 2,300 meters

The Centurion C-RAM, also called the Land Phalanx Weapon System (LPWS), is an American counter-rocket, artillery, and mortar (C-RAM) air defense artillery system. It was developed in 2004, when combat during the Iraq War identified a weakness in ground-based anti-projectile artillery. The system is produced by Northrop Grumman, Raytheon, and Oshkosh Corporation.

== Description ==
The Centurion was developed and produced by Northrop Grumman, Raytheon, and Oshkosh Corporation during Operation Enduring Freedom to provide defense from rockets and artillery/mortar shells, fulfilling the counter rocket, artillery, and mortar (C-RAM) role. The system was developed from the Navy's ship-based Phalanx Close-in Weapons System (CIWS) when the Army requested to use the already-produced system to defend against indirect fire after an increase in mortar attacks. The system was first tested by Raytheon in November 2004, entering full service with the Army in 2005 as part of the forward area air defense system. The Army’s strategy was to stop indirect fire from impacting friendly forces or assets, by tracking and warning friendly units, or destroying the munition.

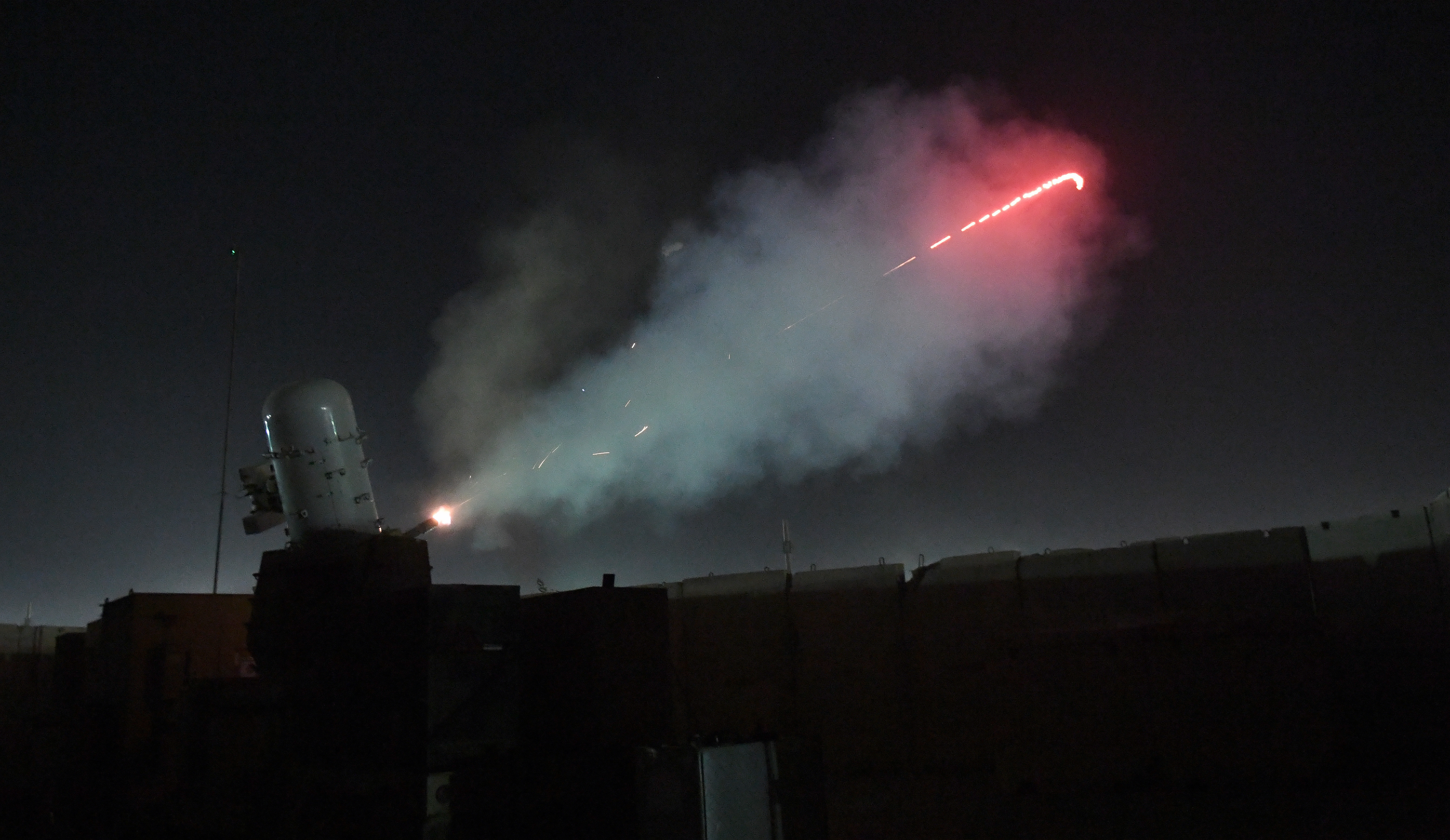
The tracers of the ammunition

The Centurion uses the 20-millimeter M-940 MPT-SD round designed by General Dynamics for air defense. The round is engineered to self-destruct 2300 meters from launch, to prevent casualties on the ground. It also contains a tracer. The Centurion has a K_{u}-band (AN/TPQ-36) active electronically scanned array radar produced by Raytheon for tracking smaller targets in the air. The Centurion can be mounted on an Oshkosh-built Heavy Expanded Mobility Tactical Truck (HEMTT) with an integrated generator and cooling system. The system was designed to be fully mobile and to increase the flexibility of the inherently stationary system. The vehicle's high power availability was needed to support the vehicle. The mobile variant is functionally the same as the stationary variant. The mobile variant is self-contained for easy deployment and movement.

The system was fielded in Afghanistan at US and allied bases that were too small to cost-effectively deploy other systems. The system has sensors and imaging so that it is fully self-contained. The Centurion shot down 70% of indirect fire in Afghanistan, defending an area roughly 1.2 kilometres (0.75 mi) around the bases as well.

The concept of a laser-based Centurion system has been suggested by companies such as Raytheon, for the ability to cover a larger area. Although projects have been abandoned in the past, and electricity consumption has consistently been too high for combat environments, lasers have been proposed as a C-RAM system that has a lower impact on the ground, as they create little debris. The laser system is also being proposed to reduce the cost of interception.

=== Specifications (mobile version) ===
- Gun: M61A1
- Shell: M-940 20 mm MPT-SD
- Range: 2,000 metres (6,600 ft)
- Fire rate: 4,500 rounds per minute
- Weight: 53,000 pounds (24,000 kg)
- Dimensions: (Trailer and truck with unit attached) Length: 19.81 m; Width: 3.65 m; Height: 4.26 m
- Radar: Ku-band (AN/TPQ-36)
- Cost: $10 million

== Operators ==
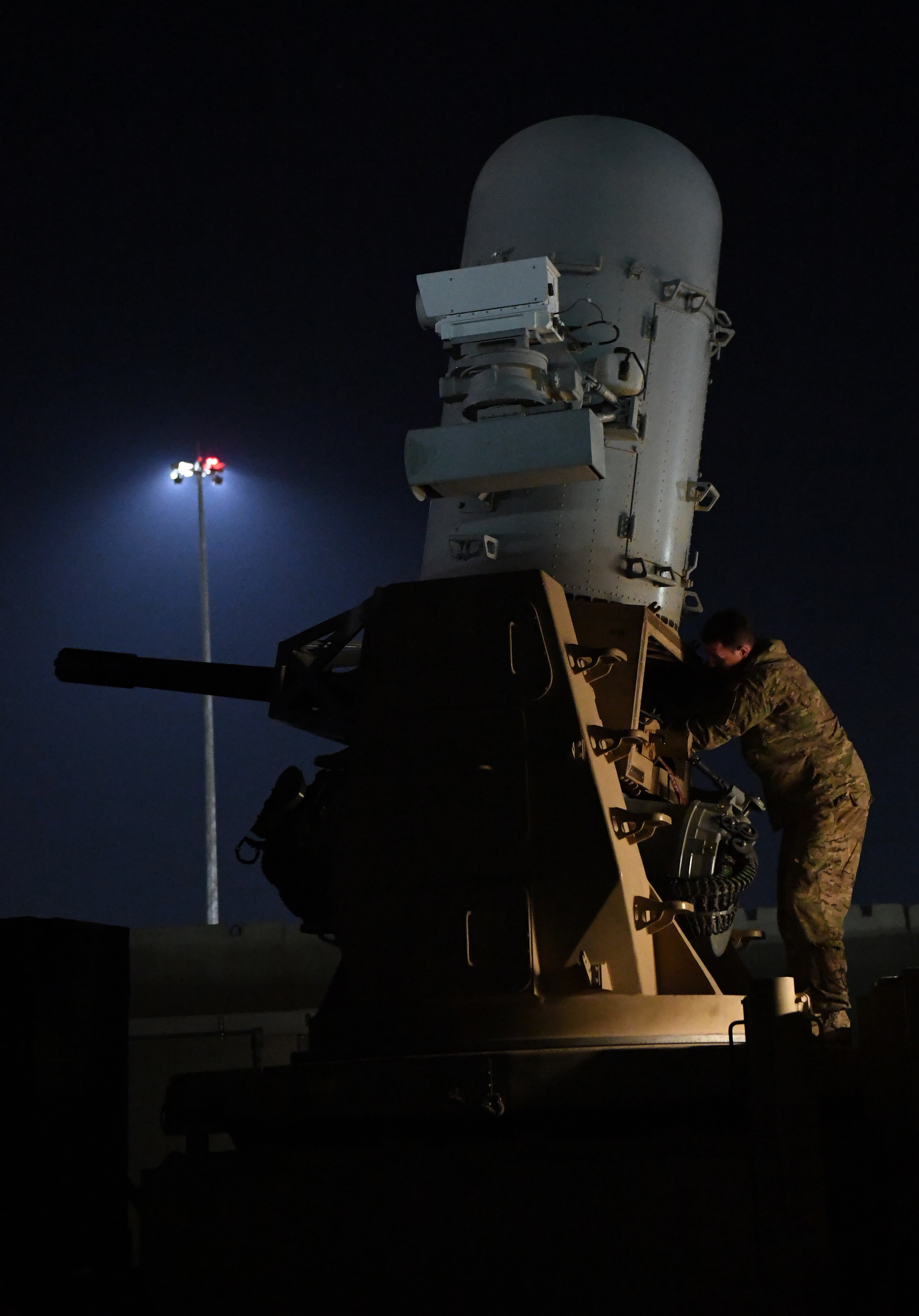
A US Army soldier performing maintenance on a Phalanx in Afghanistan.

Name of operator		Year acquired
(United States)	United States Army (Note: Used primarily to defend bases in Iraq.)	2004
(United Kingdom)	British Armed Forces (Note: Originally rented from the United States)	2007
(Israel)	Israel Defense Forces (Note: Acquired for testing as a candidate for the Iron Dome air defense system.)	2009
(Australia)	Australian Defence Force	2016

Initially, the C-RAM systems were distributed to United States allies for use against insurgent mortar attacks in the Iraq War, this being a common type of attack. The system was operated by several countries in the Green Zone to defend against attacks on embassies in the area. The system has been pushed as an idea to counter Iranian missiles and drones, especially in the Gulf states and in Ukraine since the Russian invasion in 2022. As of 2008, the US Army had received 22 systems, leading to the Navy experiencing some delays.
