= Miniature Hit-to-Kill Missile =

- Type: Short-range, Active radar homing, Passive radar homing surface-to-air missile
- Place of origin: United States of America

Production history
- Manufacturer: Lockheed Martin
- Unit cost: $16,000
- Variants: Active and Passive radar guidance versions

Specifications
- Mass: 5 lb (2.3 kg)
- Length: 2.5 ft (0.76 m)
- Height: 2.8 in (71 mm)
- Diameter: 1.6 in (41 mm)
- Wingspan: 2.8 in (71 mm)
- Engine: Solid-fuel rocket motor
- Guidance system: Active or Passive radar guidance
- Launch platform: 'Surface-launched:’: Multi-Mission Launcher

The Miniature Hit-to-Kill Missile (MHTK) is a small air defense missile developed by Lockheed Martin for the short range air defense (SHORAD) and Counter Rocket, Artillery, and Mortar (C-RAM). Like the Israeli Tamir and Stunner the MHTK uses hit-to-kill for the terminal phase of interception.

== Origins ==
The MHTK was first tested by the US Army in April 2016 as part of an engineering demonstration for the Indirect Fire Protection Capability Increment 2-Intercept program.

== Development ==
Development began in 2012. In 2018 the US Army awarded Lockheed Martin US$2.6 million to begin formal development of the missile as part of the Extended Mission Area Missile (EMAM) program.

== Variants ==
Both active and semi-active radar homing versions have been developed, as of 2018 they share a common configuration.

== See also ==
- Multi-Mission Launcher
- List of missiles
- ADATS
- Lightweight Multirole Missile
