= M-940 20mm MPT-SD Round =

Type of 20×102mm ammunition

The M940 MPT-SD (multi-purpose tracer, self-destruct) shell is a 20×102 mm round produced by General Dynamics primarily for an anti-aircraft role. It has a range of over 2,000 metres (6,600 ft). The round includes a red tracer to aid in targeting. The round includes a high explosive and incendiary component and can also defeat light armor (hence its multi-purpose designation). The self-destruct feature engages at approximately 2,300 metres (7,500 ft) and destroys the round, preventing it from falling back to earth and inflicting damage on the surrounding territory. The price per round in 2008 was approximately $27.

== See also ==
- Centurion C-RAM
